= List of Christian monasteries in Denmark =

The following is a list, as yet incomplete, of Christian religious houses in Denmark whether extant or not, for both men and for women.

== Denmark ==
Religious house	Location	Region	Dedication	Order	Notes
Æbelholt Abbey	Tjæreby near Hillerød	Region Hovedstaden	Saint Thomas	Augustinian canons	1176–1536; moved here from Eskilsø
Franciscan Friary, Copenhagen (or Greyfriars)	Copenhagen	Region Hovedstaden		Franciscan friars	1238–1530
Poor Clares' Priory, Copenhagen	Copenhagen	Region Hovedstaden		Poor Clares	1497–1535
Carmelite Priory, Copenhagen	Copenhagen	Region Hovedstaden		Carmelite friars	1479–1529
Hospital of the Holy Ghost, Copenhagen	Copenhagen	Region Hovedstaden	Holy Ghost	Order of the Holy Ghost to 1497, Augustinian canons thereafter	1296–1530
St. Gertrude's Hospital, Copenhagen	Copenhagen	Region Hovedstaden	Saint Gertrude		dates tbe
St. George's Leper Hospital, Copenhagen	Copenhagen	Region Hovedstaden	Saint George		before 1261–1609
Eskilsø Abbey	Eskilsø in the Roskilde Fjord	Region Hovedstaden		Augustinian canons	first half of 12th century-1176; moved to Æbelholt
Esrum Abbey	Esrum Sø, Græsted	Region Hovedstaden		Cistercian monks (formerly Benedictine monks)	1151-1536
Carmelite Priory, Helsingør (Priory of Our Lady, Helsingør)	Helsingør	Region Hovedstaden	Blessed Virgin Mary	Carmelite friars	1430–1536
Dominican Priory, Helsingør	Helsingør	Region Hovedstaden	Saint Nicholas	Dominican friars	1441–1536
Franciscan Friary, Helsingør	Helsingør	Region Hovedstaden	Saint Anne	Franciscan friars	1420–1537; now the site of Marienlyst Castle
Knardrup Abbey	Knardrupsgård north-west of Copenhagen, between Ganløse and Måløv	Region Hovedstaden		Cistercian monks	1326–1536
Slangerup Abbey	Slangerup	Region Hovedstaden	Blessed Virgin Mary and Saint Nicholas	Benedictine nuns to 1187, Cistercian nuns thereafter	1170–1555
Aastrup Kloster, Aastrup Jomfrukloster or Det Grevelige Dannemandske Stift Aastrup	Aastrup, Soderup, Roskilde	Region Sjælland		Lutheran women's collegiate foundation	1886–1983 or -88
Antvorskov	Slagelse	Region Sjælland	Saint John the Baptist	Knights Hospitallers	1164–1536
Asserbo Charterhouse	Roskilde	Region Sjælland		Carthusian monks	1162/63–c.1169/70; after Carthusians left, site abandoned, and later given as a grange to the Cistercians at Sorø
Hospital of the Holy Ghost, Elvedgård	Søndersø, island of Funen	Region Sjælland	Holy Ghost	Order of the Holy Ghost	1475–1536
St. Agnes' Priory, Gavnø	Gavnø	Region Sjælland	Saint Agnes	Dominican nuns	1403–1536
Gisselfeld Adelige Jomfrukloster	Gisselfeld Castle, Bråby	Region Sjælland		Lutheran women's collegiate foundation	founded 1755; extant
Halsted Priory	Nakskov, Lolland	Region Sjælland	Saint Samson of Dol	Benedictine monks	1290–1536
Holbæk Priory	Holbæk	Region Sjælland	Saint Nicholas	Dominican friars	1275–1535
Kalundborg Friary	Kalundborg	Region Sjælland		Franciscan friars	1240–1532
Køge Friary	Køge	Region Sjælland	Blessed Virgin Mary (Saint Mary of Consolation)	Franciscan friars	1484–1531
Maribo Abbey	Maribo	Region Sjælland]	Blessed Virgin Mary	Bridgettines to 1536; refounded 1551 as Lutheran women's collegiate foundation (Adelige Jomfrukloster)	1416–1536; 1551–1621
Næstved Priory or St Peter's Priory, Næstved	Næstved	Region Sjælland	Saint Peter	Dominican friars	1265–1536
Næstved Friary	Næstved	Region Sjælland		Franciscan friars	1242–1532
Hospital of the Holy Ghost, Nakskov	Nakskov	Region Sjælland	Holy Ghost	Order of the Holy Ghost, monks and nuns	1470–1536
Nykøbing Friary	Nykøbing Falster	Region Sjælland	Blessed Virgin Mary, Saint Michael and Saint Francis	Franciscan friars	1419–1532
Nysted Friary	Nysted	Region Sjælland		Franciscan friars	1286–1538
Hospital of St. Anthony, Præstø	Præstø	Region Sjælland	Saint Anthony	Hospital Brothers of St. Anthony	1470–1536
Ringsted Abbey	Ringsted	Region Sjælland	Blessed Virgin Mary	Benedictine monks	1134–1536
Roskilde Abbey (Abbey of Our Lady, Roskilde)	Roskilde	Region Sjælland	Blessed Virgin Mary	Benedictine nuns to 1177, thereafter Cistercian nuns	1160–1536
St. Catherine's Priory, Roskilde	Roskilde	Region Sjælland	Saint Catherine of Siena	Dominican friars	1231–1536
St. Agnes' Priory, Roskilde	Roskilde	Region Sjælland	Saint Agnes	Dominican nuns	1263–1527
Franciscan Friary, Roskilde	Roskilde	Region Sjælland		Franciscan friars	1237–1537
St. Clare's Priory, Roskilde	Roskilde	Region Sjælland	Saint Clare of Assisi	Poor Clares	1256–1537
Dominican Priory, Skælskør	Skælskør	Region Sjælland		Dominican friars	c.1300–1536
Carmelite Priory, Skælskør	Skælskør	Region Sjælland		Carmelite friars	1418–1532
Skovkloster Abbey	Næstved	Region Sjælland	Saint Peter	Benedictine monks	1175–1536; after the Reformation turned into a school as Herlufsholm School, which is still extant
Sorø Abbey	Sorø	Region Sjælland		Benedictine monks to 1161 or 1162, thereafter Cistercians	1142–1536; after the Reformation turned into a school as Sorø Academy, which is still extant
Vallø Adelige Jomfrukloster	Vallø Castle	Region Sjælland		Lutheran noblewomen's collegiate foundation	founded 1737; extant
Vemmetofte Adelige Jomfrukloster	Faxe	Region Sjælland		Lutheran noblewomen's collegiate foundation	founded 1735; extant
Vordingborg Priory	Vordingborg	Region Sjælland		Dominican friars	1253–c. 1265
Aalborg Abbey (Abbey of Our Lady, Aalborg)	Aalborg	Region Nordjylland	Blessed Virgin Mary	Benedictine nuns	1125–1527
Aalborg Friary	Aalborg	Region Nordjylland		Franciscan friars	1250–1530
Hospital of the Holy Ghost, Aalborg	Aalborg	Region Nordjylland	Holy Ghost	Order of the Holy Ghost	1451–1536
St. George's Hospital, Aalborg	Aalborg	Region Nordjylland	Saint George	order uncertain	–1534
Børglum Abbey	Børglum near Løkken	Region Nordjylland		Premonstratensian canons	1209–1536
Dueholm Priory	Nykøbing Mors	Region Nordjylland	Saint John the Baptist	Knights Hospitallers	1370–1536
Glenstrup Abbey	Glenstrup near Randers	Region Nordjylland	Blessed Virgin Mary	Benedictine monks	1125–1431 and 1441–1445; the premises were given to the Carthusians in 1432; the Benedictines reoccupied them in 1441, but were removed again in 1445, when the site was given as an estate to the Bridgettines of Mariager Abbey
Glenstrup Charterhouse	Glenstrup near Randers	Region Nordjylland		Carthusian monks	1432–1441; established in the former Benedictine Glenstrup Abbey
Hundslund Priory now Dronninglund Castle	Dronninglund Castle	Region Nordjylland	Blessed Virgin Mary and Saint Clement	Benedictine nuns	1250–1535
Ø Abbey	Oxholm in Øland	Region Nordjylland		Benedictine nuns	1175–1536
Sebber Priory	Sebbersund	Region Nordjylland	Saint Lawrence	Benedictine nuns	c. 1250–1536
Sæby Priory	Sæby	Region Nordjylland		Carmelite friars	c.1460–1536
Vestervig Abbey	Thisted	Region Nordjylland		Augustinian canons	c.1110-1536
Kappel Priory	Vestervig	Region Nordjylland		nuns (order uncertain)	dates tbe
Vitskøl Abbey	Ranum, Himmerland	Region Nordjylland		Cistercian monks	1158–1536; renamed Bjørnsholm
Vrejlev Priory	Vrå	Region Nordjylland		Premonstratensian canons from Børglum Abbey to 1200; Premonstratensian nuns thereafter	1165-1536
Carmelite priory, Aarhus	Aarhus	Region Midtjylland		Carmelite friars	1460s–1531
Dominican Priory, Aarhus	Aarhus	Region Midtjylland	Blessed Virgin Mary	Dominican friars	c.1240-1530
Alling Abbey	Svostrup, Gjern	Region Midtjylland	Saint John	Benedictine monks	1250–1536; moved here from Vejerslev
Essenbæk Abbey	Assentoft near Randers	Region Midtjylland		Benedictine monks	1179-1529; moved here from Randers
Grinderslev Priory	Grinderslev	Region Midtjylland	Saint Peter	Augustinian canons	1150-1536
Gudum Priory	Gudum	Region Midtjylland		Benedictine nuns	1250–1536
Franciscan Friary, Horsens	Horsens	Region Midtjylland		Franciscan friars	1261–1532
Knights Hospitallers, Horsens	Horsens	Region Midtjylland	Saint John the Baptist	Knights Hospitallers	1375–1536
Kalvø Abbey	Kalvø Island in the Skanderborg Sø	Region Midtjylland		Cistercian monks	1167–1172); community moved here from Veng Abbey, and moved on to found Øm Abbey
Mariager Abbey	Mariager	Region Midtjylland		Bridgettines	1446–1536
Øm Abbey	Mossø, in Gammel Rye	Region Midtjylland		Cistercian monks	1172-1536; the community settled at Øm in 1172, having been formerly located, in quick succession from 1165 onwards, at Sabro, Sminge, Veng and Kalvø
Ørslev Abbey	Ørslevkloster, Skive	Region Midtjylland		Benedictine nuns	1175-1536
Randers Abbey	Randers	Region Midtjylland	Blessed Virgin Mary	Benedictine double monastery until c. 1140; Benedictine nuns thereafter	c.1125-1428; monks moved to Essenbæk c.1140
Hospital of the Holy Ghost, Randers	Randers	Region Midtjylland	Holy Ghost	Order of the Holy Ghost	1485–1532
Franciscan Friary, Randers	Randers	Region Midtjylland		Franciscan friars	1236–1530
Ring Abbey	Hylke on the Skanderborg Sø	Region Midtjylland		Benedictine nuns	c.1175-1536
Sabro Abbey	Sabro	Region Midtjylland		Cistercian monks	1165; community moved almost immediately to Sminge
Sminge Abbey	Voel on the Sminger Sø	Region Midtjylland		Cistercian monks	1165–1166; community moved here from Sabro, and moved on to Veng
Støvringgård Jomfrukloster	Støvringgård near Randers	Region Midtjylland		Lutheran women's collegiate foundation	founded 1745; extant
Stubber Priory	Ginding, Hardsyssel	Region Midtjylland		Benedictine nuns	c.1150-1536
Tvilum Priory	Tvilum, Gjern	Region Midtjylland		Augustinian canons	c.1247-1536
Tvis Abbey	Storå, Holstebro	Region Midtjylland		Cistercian monks	1163-1536
Vejerslev Abbey	Randers	Region Midtjylland		Benedictine monks	1150–1225; moved to Alling
Vejle Priory	Vejle	Region Midtjylland		Dominican friars	1325–1530
Veng Abbey	Veng	Region Midtjylland		Benedictine monks to 1165; Cistercian monks thereafter	1060s-1165; after the Benedictines left, the premises were occupied briefly by Cistercian monks from Sminge, who almost immediately moved on to Kalvø
St. Mary's Abbey, Viborg	Viborg	Region Midtjylland	Saint Mary	Augustinian canons	dates tbe
Asmild Abbey	Viborg	Region Midtjylland	Saint Margaret	Augustinian nuns	1167-1536
Dominican Priory, Viborg (Blackfriars)	Viborg	Region Midtjylland		Dominican friars	c.1240-1529
Franciscan Friary, Viborg	Viborg	Region Midtjylland		Franciscan friars	1235–1530
St. John's Priory, Viborg	Viborg	Region Midtjylland	Saint John the Baptist	Knights Hospitallers	c.1275-1536
Vissing Priory	Vorladegård	Region Midtjylland		Benedictine nuns	c.1200-1450
Voer Abbey	Vorladegård	Region Midtjylland		Benedictine monks	1150-1532
Assens Priory	Assens	Region of Southern Denmark		Carmelite friars	1500–1530
Dalum Abbey	Dalum	Region of Southern Denmark		Benedictine nuns	1200-1529
Hospital of the Holy Ghost, Fåborg	Fåborg	Region of Southern Denmark	Holy Ghost	Order of the Holy Ghost	1477–1540
Haderslev Priory	Haderslev	Region of Southern Denmark		Dominican friars	1250–1527
Holme Abbey now Brahetrolleborg	Brahetrolleborg, island of Funen	Region of Southern Denmark		Cistercian monks	1172-1536
Kolding Friary	Kolding	Region of Southern Denmark		Franciscan friars	1288–1530
Løgum Abbey	Løgumkloster	Region of Southern Denmark		Cistercian monks	1173-1536; community moved here from Seem
St. Alban's Priory, Odense	Odense	Region of Southern Denmark	Blessed Virgin Mary; Saint Alban	Benedictine monks	c.1075-c.1100; replaced by St. Canute's Abbey, Odense
St. Canute's Abbey, Odense	Odense	Region of Southern Denmark	Saint Canute	Benedictine monks	c.1100-1536; replaced St. Alban's Priory, Odense
Nonnebakken Abbey (1175–1200): Benedictine nuns (moved to Dalum)	Odense	Region of Southern Denmark		Benedictine nuns	1175–1200; community moved to Dalum
Dominican Priory, Odense	Odense	Region of Southern Denmark	Saint Peter	Dominican friars	1240–1536
Franciscan Friary, Odense	Odense	Region of Southern Denmark		Franciscan friars	
St. Clare's Priory, Odense	Odense	Region of Southern Denmark	Saint Clare of Assisi	Poor Clares	1522–1538
St. John's Priory, Odense	Odense	Region of Southern Denmark	Saint John the Baptist	Knights Hospitallers	c.1275-1536
Odense Adelige Jomfrukloster	Odense	Region of Southern Denmark		Lutheran noblewomen's collegiate foundation	founded 1716; amalgamated with the Roskilde Adelige Jomfrukoster in 1974
St. Nicholas' Priory, Ribe	Ribe	Region of Southern Denmark	Saint Nicholas	Benedictine nuns	1170-1532; the community moved here from the former double monastery at Seem
St. Catherine's Priory, Ribe	Ribe	Region of Southern Denmark	Saint Catherine of Siena	Dominican friars	1228-1531
Franciscan Friary, Ribe	Ribe	Region of Southern Denmark		Franciscan friars	1232-1537
St. John's Priory, Ribe	Ribe	Region of Southern Denmark	Saint John the Baptist	Knights Hospitallers	c.1300-1537
St. George's Leper Hospital, Ribe	Ribe	Region of Southern Denmark	Saint George		dates tbe
Seem Abbey	Ribe	Region of Southern Denmark		Benedictine double monastery to 1170, when nuns removed; Cistercian monks from 1171	c.1150-1173; Benedictine double monastery until nuns moved to Ribe in 1170; resettled as a Cistercian monastery from Herrevad; community moved to Løgum in 1173
Svendborg Friary	Svendborg	Region of Southern Denmark		Franciscan friars	1236-1537
Svendborg Leper Hospital	Svendborg	Region of Southern Denmark		order uncertain but closely connected to the Franciscan friary	dates tbe
Tønder Friary	Tønder	Region of Southern Denmark		Franciscan friars	1238–1530

== Former Danish territories now in Germany ==
=== Southern Schleswig ===
Religious house	Location	Dedication	Order	Notes
Flensburg Friary	Flensburg		Franciscan friars	1263–1528
Guldholm Abbey	Guldholm		Benedictine monks, later Cistercian monks	1190/91-1210; community transferred from St. Michael's Abbey, Schleswig; moved to Ryd Abbey
Husum Friary	Husum		Franciscan friars	1494–1528
Mohrkirchen Hospital	Mohrkirch	Saint Anthony	Hospital Brothers of St. Anthony	1391–1535
Ryd Abbey or Rüde Abbey	Glücksburg		Cistercian monks	1210-1536
St. John's Priory, Schleswig	Schleswig	Saint John	Benedictine nuns	c.1200-1536
St. Michael's Abbey, Schleswig	Schleswig	Saint Michael	Benedictine double monastery, later Benedictine nuns	c. 1030-c. 1200; the monks were removed for disciplinary reasons c.1190 and sent to found Guldholm Abbey
Dominican Friary, Schleswig	Schleswig		Dominican friars	1239–1529
Franciscan Friary, Schleswig	Schleswig		Franciscan friars	1232–1530

See also List of Christian monasteries in Schleswig-Holstein
For Rügen, see List of Christian monasteries in Mecklenburg-Vorpommern

== Former Danish territories in Skåne and Halland, now in Sweden ==
Religious house	Location	Region	Dedication	Order	Notes
Åhus Priory	Åhus	Skåne		Dominican friars	1250–1536
Bäckaskog Abbey (Danish: Bækkeskov)	Kristianstad Municipality	Skåne		Premonstratensian canons	c.1225-1537; community formerly at Væ (Vä)
Bosjö Abbey (Danish: Bosø)	Höör Municipality	Skåne		Benedictine monks or nuns	c.1175-1536
Börringe Priory (Danish: Børringe)	Svedala Municipality	Skåne		initially Benedictine monks, replaced c.1231 by Benedictine nuns	c.1150-1536
Dalby Abbey, previously Dalby Priory	Dalby	Skåne		Cluniac monks; replaced mid-12th century by Augustinian canons	c.1060-1537
Helsingborg Priory	Helsingborg	Skåne		Dominican friars	1235-1537
Herrevad Abbey	Ljungsbyhed	Skåne		Cistercian monks	c.1140-1536
Landskrona Priory	Landskrona	Skåne		Carmelite friars	1410–1530
Lund Abbey	Lund	Skåne		Benedictine monks	1080-1537
St. Peter's Priory, Lund	Lund	Skåne	Saint Peter	Benedictine nuns	1166-1537
St. Mary's Priory, Lund	Lund	Skåne	Saint Mary	Dominican friars	1223-1530
St. Catherine's Priory, Lund	Lund	Skåne	Saint Catherine	Franciscan friars	1238–1537
Trinity Priory, Lund	Lund	Skåne	Holy Trinity	Premonstratensian canons	1160?-1200
Malmö Friary	Malmö	Skåne		Franciscan friars	1419–1530
Hospital of the Holy Ghost, Malmö	Malmö	Skåne	Holy Ghost	Order of the Holy Ghost	1475–1529
Öved Abbey (Danish: Øved), now Övedskloster	Sjöbo	Skåne		Premonstratensian canons	1160-1535
Tommarp Abbey	Tommarp (Danish: Tommerup)	Skåne		Premonstratensian canons	1150-1536
St. George's Hospital, Tommarp	Tommarp (Danish: Tommerup)	Skåne	Saint George	order unknown (possibly a fraternity)	1285-1536?
Trelleborg Friary	Trelleborg	Skåne		Franciscan friars	1267–1532
Torkö Friary	Torkö	Skåne		Franciscan friars	1489–1530
Vä Abbey	Vä (Danish: Væ near Kristianstad)	Skåne		Premonstratensian canons	1170–1213; community re-settled at Bækkeskov [Bäckaskog]
Ystad Friary	Ystad (Danish: Ysted)	Skåne		Franciscan friars	1267–1532
Ås Abbey	Varberg Municipality	Halland		Cistercian monks	1194-1536
Halmstad Friary	Halmstad	Halland		Franciscan friars	1494-153
St. Catherine's Priory, Halmstad	Halmstad	Halland		Dominican friars	c.1260-1531
Varberg Priory	Varberg	Halland		Carmelite friars	1470–1530

See also List of Christian monasteries in Sweden

== Sources ==
- Garner, H. N., 1968: Atlas over danske klostre (in Danish)
- Digitalt atlas over klostre i middelalderens Danmark (in Danish)
- MiddelalderInfo om danske klostre og kirker (in Danish)
