= St. John's Abbey =

St. John's Abbey may refer to:

- St. John's Abbey, Colchester, England
- St. John's Abbey, Kilkenny, Ireland
- Saint John Abbey, Müstair, Switzerland
- Saint John's Abbey, Collegeville, Minnesota
- St. John's Abbey in the Thurtal, Switzerland
- St. John's Abbey, Bremen, Germany
- Alling Abbey, Denmark

== See also ==
- St. John's Priory (disambiguation)
