= Løvenholm =

Løvenholm Castle
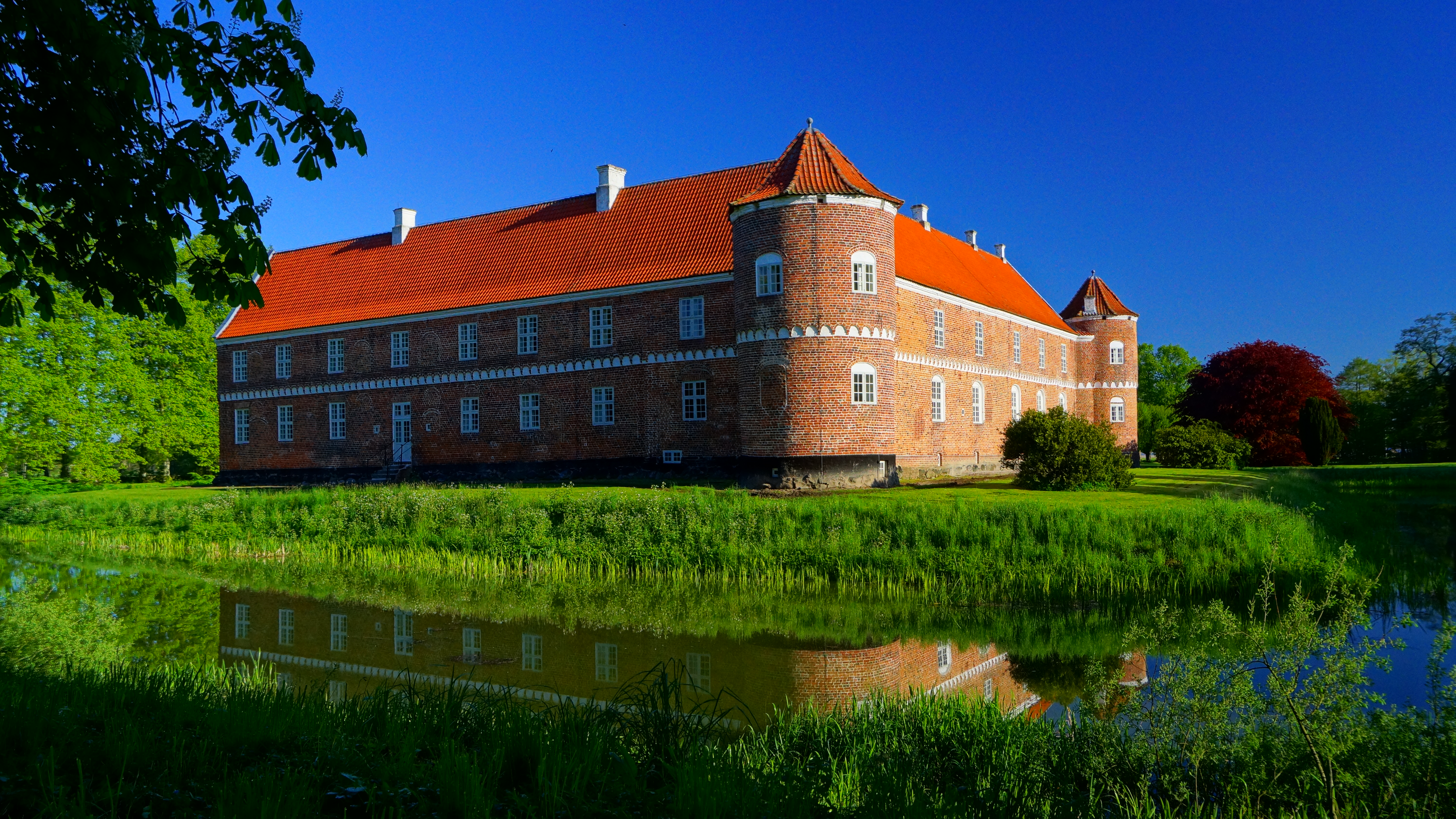
- Løvenholm Castle

- Location within Denmark

General information
- Architectural style: Renaissance
- Location: Norddjurs Municipality, Denmark
- Coordinates: 56°27′59″N 10°41′33″E
- Construction started: 1550
- Completed: 1633
- Owner: Løvenholm Foundation

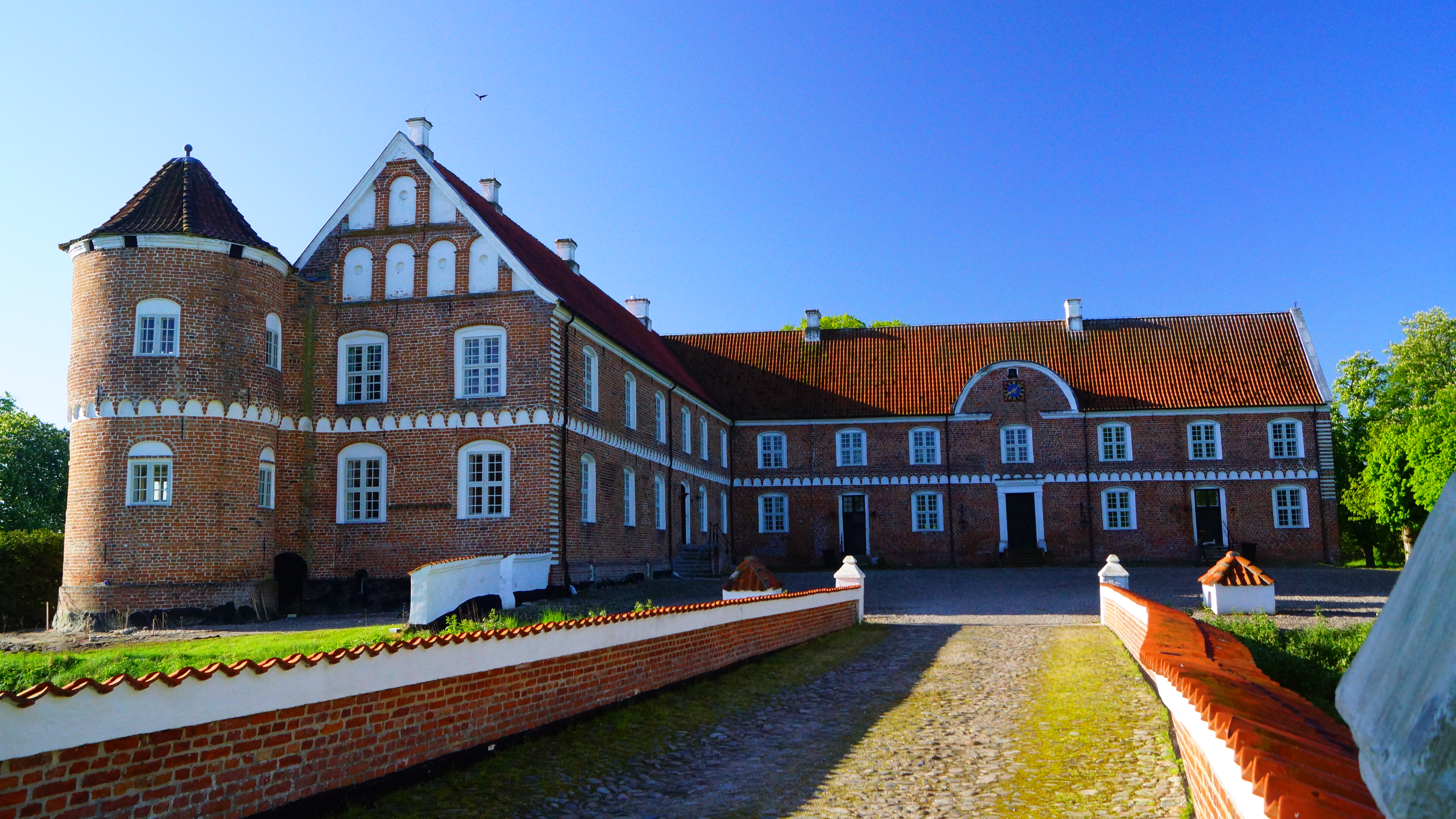
Main building seen from the yard

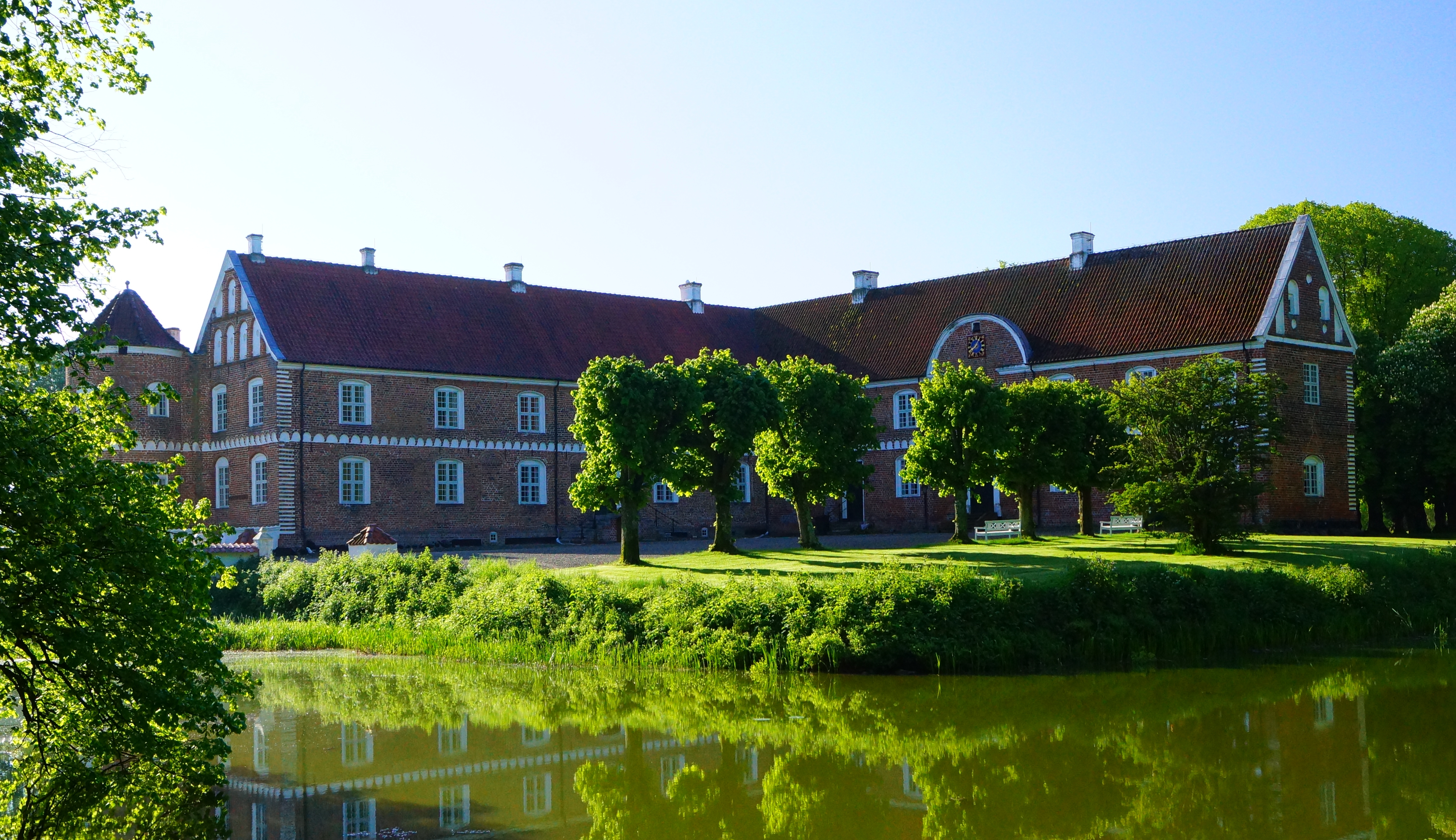
Seen from North-West

Løvenholm is a castle and estate 23 km (14 mi) east of Randers in Jutland, Denmark, owned by a foundation. Its grounds can be accessed on public footpaths. The former monastery was established in 1440, and was called Gjesingholm from 1440 til 1674. The nearby village is still called Gjesing. The name, Løvenholm - lions island - was used from 1674. The main building was constructed in the periods 1550-1576 and 1642-1643

Today Løvenholm is a forest and farming estate with 3,261 ha (8,060 acres) of land. Løvenholm Forest is one of the larger woodlands in Denmark. Public access on foot or bike is allowed on the forest roads, as well as on the paths around the castle.

The original monastery belonged to St. John's Priory in Viborg. A son of an owner, Vilhelm Adolf had his older brother, Count Ditlev Christian, murdered on a hunt on 1 March 1674. After this the estate was turned over to the throne. On 12 April 1732, King Christian VI reestablished Løvenholm as a countship for Frederik Christian Danneskiold-Samsøe, who just 10 years later on 17 August 1742 obtained permission from the king to cancel the countship. At the same time he sold Løvenholm to his older brother, Count Ulrik Adolph Danneskiold-Samsøe. Thereafter the estate often changed hands, and in 1827 the State took it over due to pending taxes. In 1831 it was returned to private ownership.

== Owners of Løvenholm ==
- (1440-1445) Saint Hans Monastery
- (1445-1536) Essenbæk Monastery
- (1536) The Crown
- (1536-1554) Erik Eriksen Banner
- (1554-1583) Anders Eriksen Banner
- (1583-1597) Erik Andersen Banner
- (1597-1609) Otte Andersen Banner
- (1609-1616) Frands Rantzau
- (1616-1627) Gert Rantzau
- (1627-1663) Christian Rantzau (son)
- (1663-1697) Ditlev Rantzau (son)
- (1697-1721) Christian Ditlev Rantzau (son)
- (1721-1726) Wilhelm Adolph Rantzau (brother)
- (1726-1732) The Crown
- (1732-1742) Frederik Christian count of Danneskiold-Samsøe
- (1742-1751) Ulrik Adolph count of Danneskiold-Samsøe
- (1751-1753) Søren Seidelin
- (1753-1756) Niels Basse
- (1756-1783) Hans Fønss
- (1783-1811) Peter Severin Fønss
- (1811-1817) Partnership
- (1817-1827) H. J. Hansen
- (1827-1831) The Danish State
- (1831-1833) H. R. Saabye / Krøyer
- (1833-1836) H. Frellsen
- (1836-1855) Christen Pind
- (1855-1874) Laura Faith / Pind
- (1874-1887) Lauritz Ulrik de la Cour
- (1887-1901) Carl August Johannes de Neergaard
- (1901-1918) Niels Peter Bornholdt
- (1918-1919) Ove Holger Christian Vind
- (1919-1929) Werner Ernst Carl greve Schimmelmann
- (1929-1951) Valdemar Uttental
- (1951-) Løvenholm Foundation
