= Sabro Korsvejskolen =

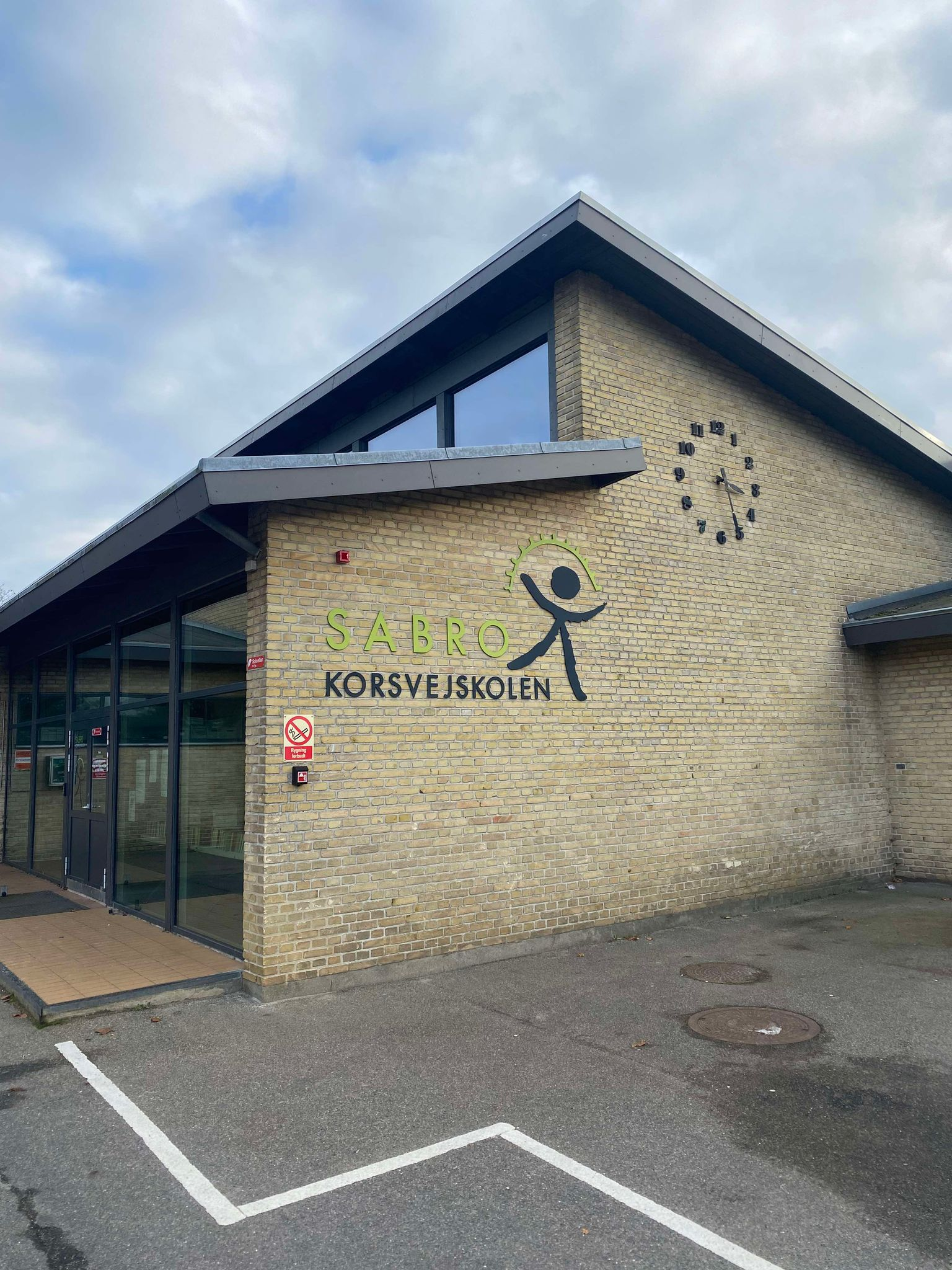

Location
- Skolevej 4 Sabro, Aarhus; Denmark
- Coordinates: 56.2114°N 10.0239°E

Information
- Type: Public School
- Established: 1964
- School district: Aarhus Municipality
- Chairman: Erik Graversen
- Principal: Stine Tegen
- Faculty: 75
- Grades: 7-step-scale
- Enrollment: 689
- Website: www.sabro-korsvejskolen.dk

Sabro Korsvejskolen is a public state-owned school (Danish: Folkeskole) located in Sabro, Aarhus. It was established in 1964.

== Organisation ==
The school consists of a pre-school, primary and lower secondary school that teaches the full period of compulsory education from the ages of 6 to 16.

The school enrolls some 700 students. The average class size is 15-25 students in the middle school and 20-25 students in the lower secondary school.

== History ==
The school was inaugurated in 1964 under the name Sabro-Korsvejskolen, but was later changed to Sabro Korsvejskolen, without the hyphen.

The school was meant to replace smaller schools in Lading, Skjoldelev, Fårup, Borum and Lyngby. Early in the planning process, Mundelstrup was also considered but not chosen.

== Grade system ==
In 2005-06 a new grade system was introduced, 7-trins-skalaen ("7-step-scale"), designed to be compatible with the ECTS grading scale.

Grade	Description		Equivalents		
Grade	Description		13-scale	ECTS	U.S.
12	excellent	For an excellent performance displaying a high level of command of all aspects of the relevant material with no, or only a few, minor weaknesses.	11/13	A	A+, A
10	very good	For a very good performance displaying a high level of command of most aspects of the relevant material with only minor weaknesses.	10	B	A-, B+
7	good	For a good performance displaying good command of the relevant material but also some weaknesses.	8/9	C	B
4	fair	For a fair performance displaying some command of the relevant material but also some major weaknesses.	7	D	B-, C+
02	adequate	For a performance meeting only the minimum requirements for acceptability.	6	E	C
00	inadequate	For a performance that does not meet the minimum requirements for acceptability.	03/5	Fx	D
−3	unacceptable	For a performance that is unacceptable in all respects.	00	F	F

== Municipality reform ==
At the local government reform in 1970, part of Lading was moved into Hammel Municipality and the rest to the Aarhus Municipality. The original school community was abolished and the school controlled from Aarhus Municipality.
