= Øm Abbey =

Cistercian monastery in Denmark

Coordinates: 56°03′00″N 09°44′50″E

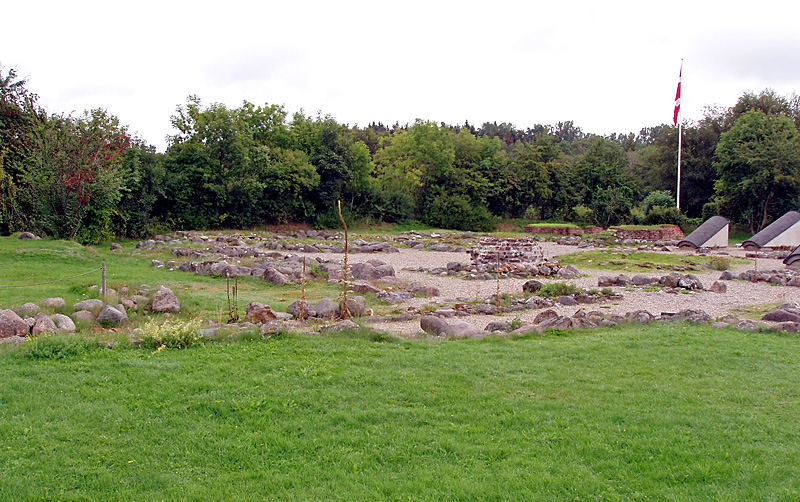
Øm Abbey ruins

Øm Abbey (Øm Kloster) was a Cistercian monastery founded in 1172 in the Diocese of Aarhus near the town of Rye, between the lakes of Mossø and Gudensø in central Jutland, Denmark. It is one of many former monasteries and abbeys in the highland region of Søhøjlandet.

== History ==
The Øm Abbey Chronicle (Øm Klosters krønike) was written by local monks from 1206 to 1267 when it abruptly ends. It documents events at the abbey during the tumultuous years.

According to chronicle, Øm Abbey was founded in 1172 by Cistercian monks from Vitskøl Abbey in northern Jutland. They had first attempted to establish a house at Sabro near Aarhus but found the soil useless for farming. They moved to the area of the Sming forest near Silkeborg but found the same poor soil conditions. In 1166 they settled for a short time at the abandoned Veng Abbey, outside Skanderborg, but left in 1167 because of unresolved land disputes with local landowners. They were at Kalvø in Lake Skanderborg for four years, but the winters proved too harsh. The monks finally settled on a patch of land in the parish of Gammel Rye between the lakes Mossø and Gudensø, surrounded by water and marshlands.

Bishop Svend of Aarhus transferred many of his own holdings to Øm Abbey and then retired there. He was buried in front of the high altar. Abbot Michael, the twelfth abbot, was buried in the chapter room in the unfinished church. Bishop Peder Elafssen of Aarhus was buried in the church in 1246, one year before it was completed.

One event which caused trouble for Øm Abbey was the suspicion that the monks harbored Abbot Arnfast of Ryd Abbey who was accused of having murdered King Christopher I of Denmark by giving him poisoned communion wine during mass at Ribe Cathedral in 1259. Abbot Arnfast was supposed to have poisoned the king for his persecution of Archbishop Jacob Erlandsen. A thorough search failed to produce Arnfast, who had fled the country. Christopher's son, King Eric V had the Cistercians banished.

In 1260 King Christopher's widow Dowager Queen Margaret Sambiria stayed at the abbey for two days with an army of 1,600 knights. The chronicle bemoans the heavy cost of such a royal visit.

The next two Bishops of Aarhus, Tyge and Peder, reclaimed some of the properties given by earlier bishops. They also claimed the right of hospitality at the abbey for themselves and their followers, which angered the monks. The Cistercians continued to support Jacob Erlandsen, Archbishop of Lund in his struggle with King Eric V of Denmark.

At its height in the late 15th century, the abbey consisted of the church, hospital, hospital cemetery, library, chapter house, refectory, dormitory, cloister and cloister garden, and a guest house. The abbey measured approximately 120 meters by 80 meters. It was one of Denmark's richest houses with land holdings, mills, and a well-recognized hospital.

The abbey prospered especially during and after the reign of Queen Margaret I of Denmark. By 1510 the abbey owned 250 properties all over central Jutland.

== Dissolution ==
The Reformation in Denmark brought about the end of the abbey. When Denmark became officially Lutheran in 1536, the abbey was allowed to continue operating with the monks already there, but no new monks were to be admitted. In 1560 the last monk was moved to Sorø Abbey on Zealand, and the land and buildings became crown property under Frederik II. Just a year later, in 1561, Frederik II ordered the buildings to be demolished, and the stone, timber, and bricks used to extend Skanderborg Castle. The land on which the abbey had been located, was divided into four large estates in 1571.

== Øm Abbey today ==
The village of Emborg now surrounds the former site of the former abbey. Øm Kloster Museum, part of the National Museum of Denmark system, now manages the monastic patrimony of the place. Ruins of the church and the chapter hall are visible, and there exists an exhibit for visitors.

== Other Sources ==
- Brian Patrick McGuire (1976) Conflict and Continuity at Øm Abbey (Museum Tusculanum Press)
