= Bornholdt =

Bornholdt is a surname. Notable people with the surname include:

- Gavin Bornholdt (1947–2011), New Zealand sailor
- Jenny Bornholdt (born 1960), New Zealand poet
- Manon Bornholdt (born 1950), German long jumper
- Niels Peter Bornholdt (1842–1924), Danish shipping agent and landowner
