= Svend I (bishop of Aarhus) =

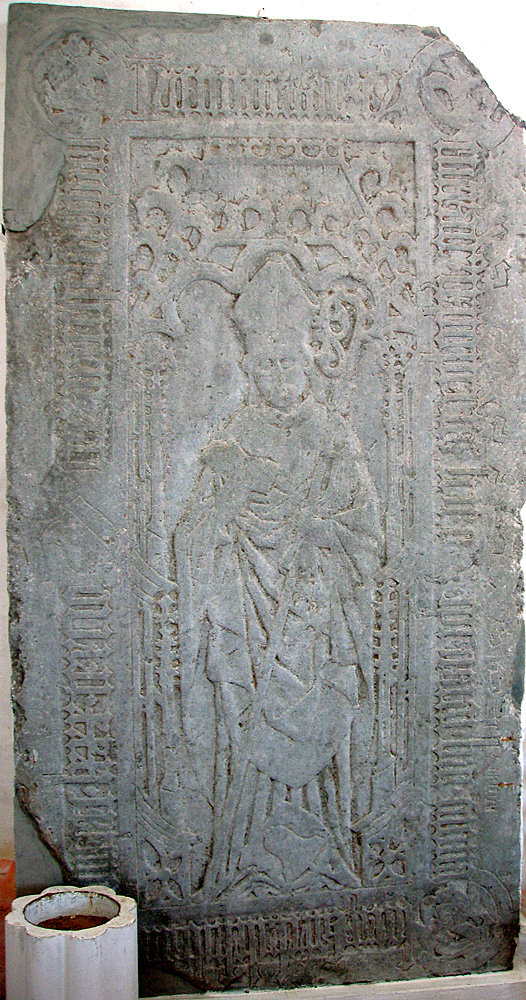
Svend's tombstone in Sankt Sørens church in Old Rye

Svend I (died 1191) was the bishop of the Diocese of Aarhus between 1166 and 1191. Svend was a warrior and crusader who participated in numerous wars and raids with the Danish king. Contemporary historian Saxo Grammaticus mentions him as belonging to the inner circle of Valdemar I and Absalon. Svend may be best known for granting the Cistercian order large gifts of land which resulted in the founding of Øm Abbey by Mossø. It is known Svend was ordained bishop no later than 1166. Svend allowed Niels of Aarhus to be buried in Aarhus' St. Nicolai Cathedral after reports of miracles around the body and in connection with the burial.

In the 1160s sources mention Svend with Absalon and Prince Buris in connection with the conquest of Wolgast. When Rügen was conquered in 1169 he received the surrender with Absalon and when the heathen relics was carried out of the city he stood on top of them. In the 1170s he participated in the conquest of Stettin and during the rebellion in Skåne Svend begged Valdemar to be merciful. Apart from the last occurrence Svend is primarily described and seen as a warrior.

The primary sources concerning Svend's relation to Øm Abbey comes from Ømbogen, the records kept by the Cistercian monks at the abbey. Characteristic for the book is that Svend is described very favorably, likely as a result of his many generous gifts to the abbey over the years. The abbey had previously been situated in Sminge, Veng and on Kalvø in Skanderborg lake, founded on land donated by Bishop Eskil. Svend successively gifted the abbey large numbers of books and amounts of land and from at least 1183 Svend had a will benefiting the abbey. When Svend died most of the land owned by Øm Abbey had been gifted by Svend. The many large gifts to the abbey became a heated subject in the years hence. There's evidence that Svend not only gifted lands owned by himself but also lands of the Diocese of Aarhus. The bishop Tyge I (1261–1272) was involved in a long and heated feud with the abbey over the rights to the lands. Svend's wills and letters were used extensively as evidence.

Svend I died in Østrup, possibly Albæk, in 1191 and was buried in Øm Abbey.

Catholic Church titles
Preceded by Vacant	Bishop of Aarhus; 1166–1191	Succeeded by Peder Vognsen
