= Svend I =

Svend I may refer to:

- Sweyn Forkbeard (died 1014), king of Denmark, England and Norway
- Svend I (bishop of Aarhus) (died 1191)
