= Vitskøl Abbey =

Coordinates: 56.8667°N 9.21667°E

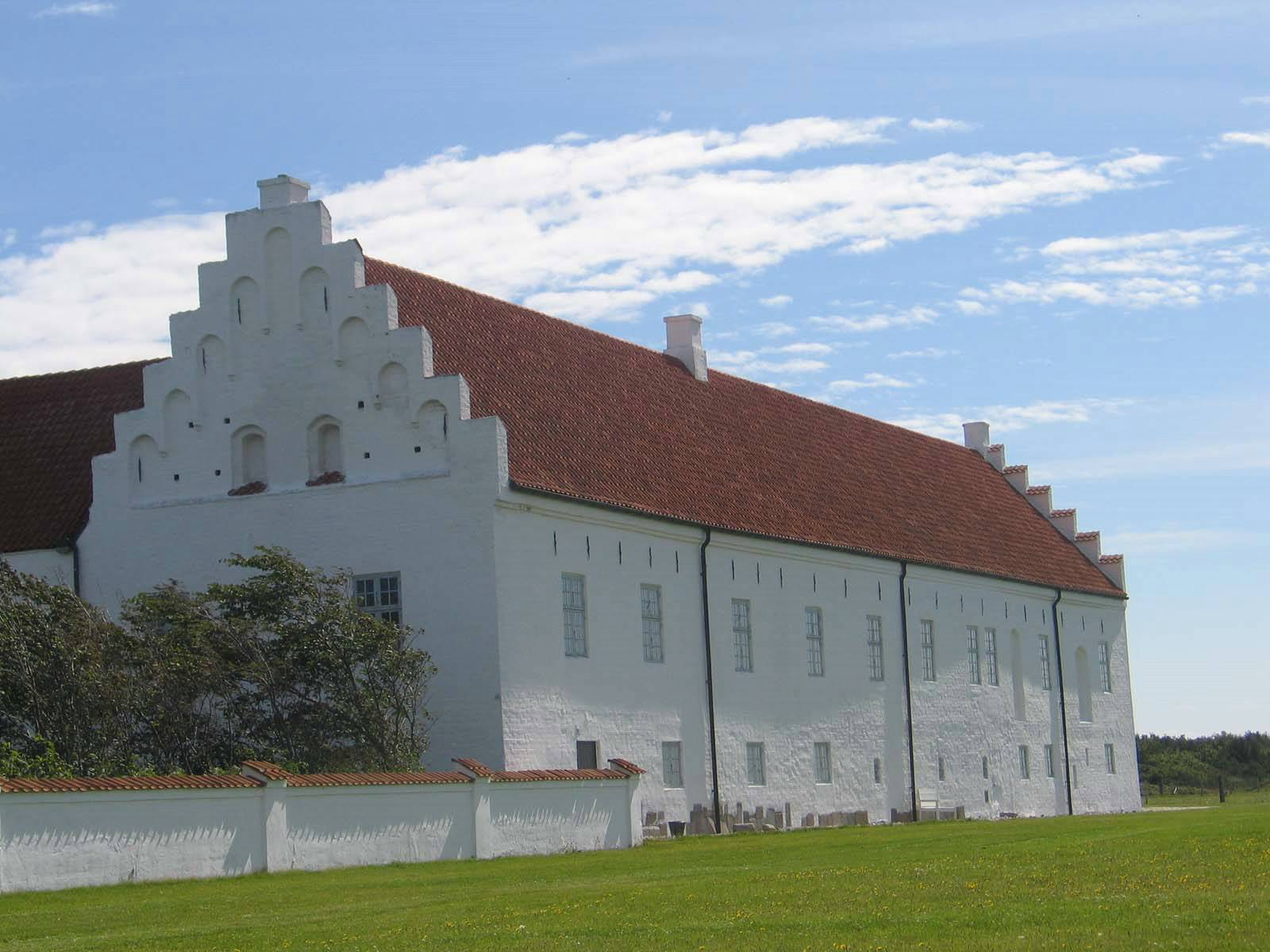
Vitskøl Abbey, west wing

Vitskøl Abbey (Danish: Vitskøl Kloster; Latin: Vitae Schola, meaning "school of life") is a former Cistercian monastery near Ranum in Himmerland in Region Nordjylland, Denmark, active from mid 12th-century until 1563, and one of the oldest existing monastic complexes in northern Europe.

== History ==
=== Vitskøl ===
Vitskøl Abbey was founded by Cistercian monks under Abbot Henrik while in exile from Varnhem Abbey in Sweden during a conflict with Queen Christina Björnsdotter of Sweden. The monks from Varnhem were later replaced by monks from Esrum Abbey, which is reckoned the mother house of Vitskøl.

It stood on an ancient trade route through north central Denmark on land given to the Cistercians by King Valdemar I the Great after his victory over King Sweyn III at the Battle of Grathe Heath, with the intent of building the largest church in Scandinavia. The exact date of the foundation is not known, but work on the buildings commenced in 1158.

As early as 1165, the community of Vitskøl had grown sufficiently to attempt to found a daughter house at Sabro. The soil conditions prevented the monks from farming successfully and they moved to Sminge, but faced the same conditions and moved on to the recently abandoned Veng Abbey, which disputes about land claims forced them to leave. They next attempted to settle on the isle of Kalvø in Skanderborg Lake, but it too failed because of the poor soil. Lastly the monks moved to the site of Øm Abbey, which succeeded.

The buildings at Vitskøl were in the usual Cistercian layout, but the cruciform church, with three aisles, a transept and an apse, was intended to be unusually large, in accordance with the founder's wishes. Work on the choir and transept continued until 1287, when a fire destroyed much of the abbey. Another feature of the early building was a large cloister with several apses built into it, a local extravagance. Eventually the work on the great church was abandoned, and a smaller abbey church was built to take care of the needs of the community.

With royal protection and the gifts of the local nobility, the abbey became the major landowner in the area, as well as a centre of cultural life and economy. The abbey also owned the island of Livø and had the right to hold a market on Trend Strand; trade and communication was further encouraged by the canal that joined the present Bjørnsholm Å to Vilsted Sø. Vitskøl also became particularly well known for its school. The abbey reached its high point in the 14th century.

When during the Reformation Denmark became officially Lutheran in October 1536, Vitskøl Abbey became crown property, but remained in operation for a while, although it was forbidden to accept any new monks. The last monks left in 1563.

=== Bjørnsholm ===
In 1573, the estate was given to Bjørn Andersen, a powerful noble, after whom it was renamed Bjørnsholm (English: The isle of Bjørn), who converted two of the conventual buildings for residential use.

The church remained in use as the parish church until the early 17th century, when it was deemed too large to keep in repair, at which point the west wing of the abbey was converted to a parish church instead. The abbey church was finally abandoned in 1668, and was used by local people as a quarry for building materials.

The property remained in private ownership until 1934 and 1942, when it was acquired by the state in two parcels.

== Present day ==
The principal residential building has been renamed Vitskøl Kloster, but the farm retains the name Bjørnsholm.

The remaining abbey buildings have now been restored and are used for conferences and educational purposes. The remaining ruins, consisting of foundation stones and a few remnants of the abbey church, have been given protected status and stabilized.

=== Herb garden ===
A reminder of the abbey's past can be found in the abbey herb garden. The abandoned gardens were allowed to grow wild and researchers found that many of the plants used by monks in the distant past could still be found on the abbey grounds. The gardens have been partially restored by local organizations and used for plant research.

== Sources ==
- Vitskøl Kloster herb garden: detailed catalogue of plants (in Danish)
- Vitskøl Kloster events (in Danish)
- Ranum website: pictures (in Danish)
- Local interest website: pictures (in Danish)
