= Skanderborg =

Danish town

- Town
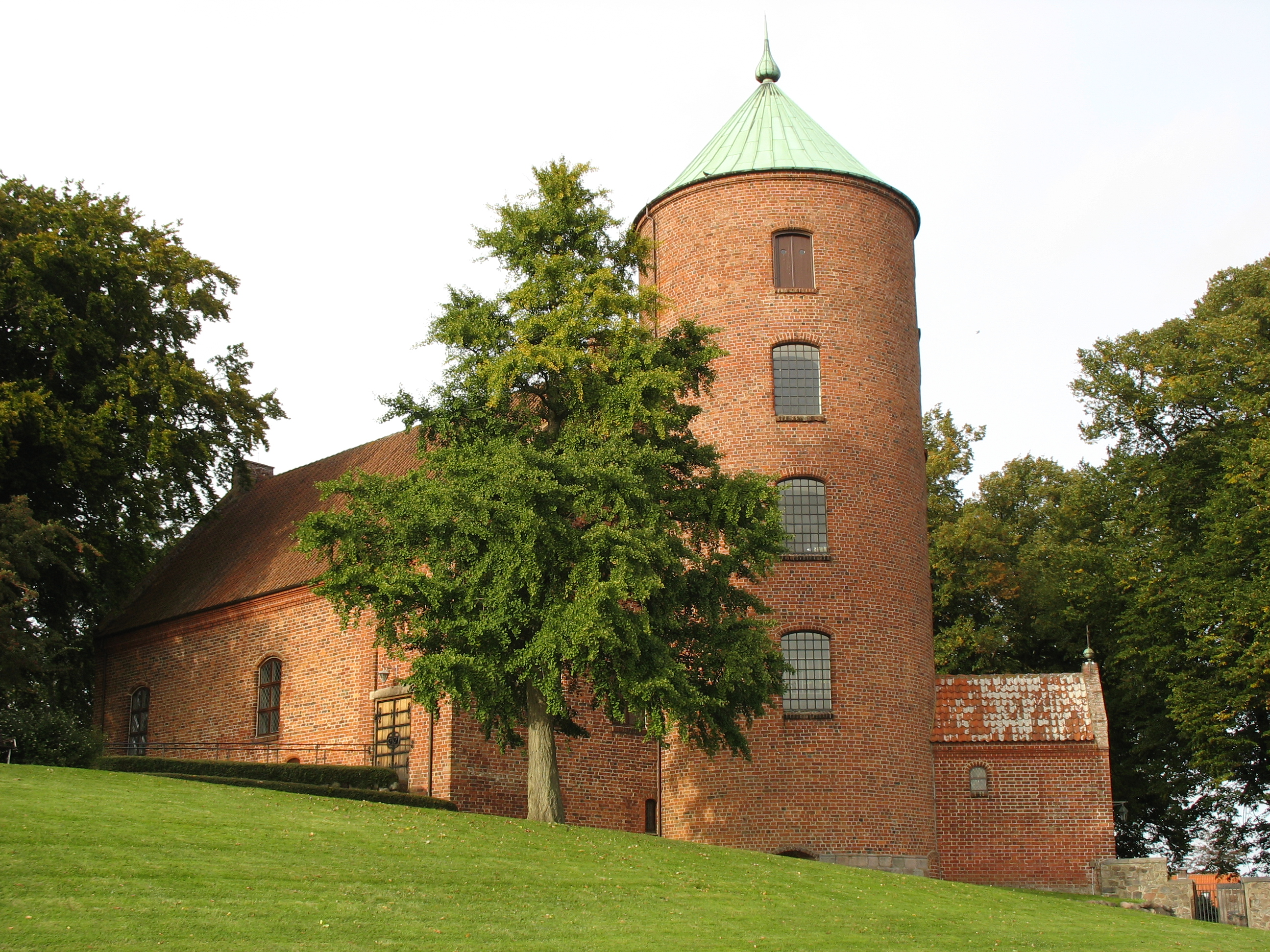
- Skanderborg Castle Church

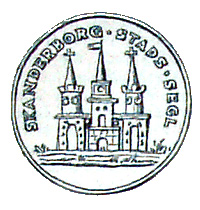
- Seal Coat of arms

- Location in Denmark Skanderborg (Central Denmark Region)
- Coordinates: 56°02′17″N 9°55′31″E
- Country: Denmark
- Region: Mid Jutland (Midtjylland)
- Municipality: Skanderborg
- Parish: Parish of Skanderborg
- Settled: Prehistory (unknown)
- Municipal charter: 1583
- Equestrian district: 1717-1767

Government
  - Type: Democratic representative electorate (4-year terms)
  - Mayor: Jørgen Gaarde (A)

Area
  - Urban: 11.3 km^{2} (4.4 sq mi)

Population (1 January 2026)
  - Urban: 20,370
  - Urban density: 1,800/km^{2} (4,670/sq mi)
  - Gender: 9,800 males and 10,570 females
- Demonym: Skanderborgenser
- Time zone: CET
  - Summer (DST): CEST
- Postal code: 8660
- Website: skanderborg.dk

Skanderborg is a town in Skanderborg Municipality, Denmark. It is situated on the north and north eastern brinks of Skanderborg Lake and there are several smaller ponds and bodies of water within the city itself, like Lillesø, Sortesø, Døj Sø and the swampy boglands of Eskebæk Mose. Just north of the town on the other side of Expressway E45, is the archaeologically important Illerup Ådal. Over time, the town has grown into a suburb of Aarhus to the north east, connected by the urban areas of Stilling, Hørning and Hasselager.

Skanderborg is home to a population of 20,370 (1 January 2026), out of Skanderborg Municipality's total population of 66,352 (2026).

== History ==
Skanderborg is an old town and the area have revealed traces of human settlements, dating from the earliest Nordic Stone Age. A seasonal camp from the Ertebølle culture, was found here in the 1930s for example, near the former Ringkloster (English: Ring Abbey) on the southern brinks of Skanderborg Lake.

The town sprawled around the former Skanderborg Castle, founded at some point during the early Middle Ages and in 1583 Skanderborg was granted a municipal charter.

=== Religious orders ===
The town of Skanderborg has attracted several religious communities over the years, especially in the early Middle Ages. The long gone Ring Abbey founded by Benedictine nuns in the 12th century, was once situated on the southeastern brinks of Skanderborg Lake. The last buildings burned down in 1715 and now there is a mansion at the site. There also used to be a Dominican monastery on the small islet of Kalvø in the middle of the lake. The monastery was founded by the Black Friar Order in the first half of the 12th century, along with a small harbour, but in 1168 there were only two monks left and the Cistercian Order took over. The Cistercians came here after they had failed in founding a proper monastery at several nearby locations since 1165. In that year, they embarked on a mission from Vitskøl Abbey in Himmerland, to found a daughter community in the diocese of Aarhus and tried at Sabro, at Sminge near Silkeborg (Sminge Abbey), and then near the village of Veng (Veng Abbey). The Cistercians eventually felt too isolated on the small isle of Kalvø, often cut off from the mainland for days and weeks even when the weather was harsh, and after just four years, they gave up here, too, and moved to Rye between Mossø and Gudensø, a few kilometres west of Skanderborg. Here they founded Øm Abbey in 1172.

== Buildings and structures ==
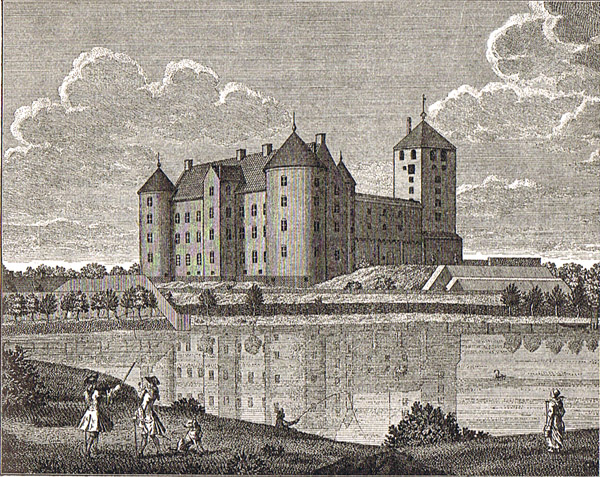
The renaissance version of Skanderborg Castle.

=== Skanderborg Castle ===
The royal residence of Skanderborg Castle was arguably the most important and influential building in the history of Skanderborg, but it was demolished stone by stone during the 18th century. Founded at some point in the early Middle Ages around 1200, King Frederik II had the old medieval castle radically rebuilt and expanded around 1570. His project was grandiose in scale. An entirely new large Renaissance palace was erected and the deer park of Skanderbrog Dyrehave was constructed nearby, amongst other undertakings. Stones from the demolished Øm Abbey west of Skanderborg were used as construction materials. Many of the original structures survived the project and were incorporated into the new buildings, amongst these the old castle chapel. In the 12th-16th centuries, Skanderborg Castle functioned as the traditional hunting retreat of the Danish kings.

==== Demolition ====
In the years of 1717–22, King Frederik IV began demolishing the old original medieval structures and replaced the former fortifications with terraced gardens. Only the bell tower of the still existing castle church remained. In turn however, Skanderborg Castle saw a decline in popularity and attention by the royal family, and in 1767, the castle with associated gardens was sold at auction. Commoner Hans Lauritzen bought the royal property for the sum of 3004 Rigsdaler, while the castle church with furnishings and bells was granted to the town of Skanderborg. In April 1768, the demolishing of Skanderborg Castle began and nothing remains of it today, except the old castle church.

=== Present buildings and structures ===
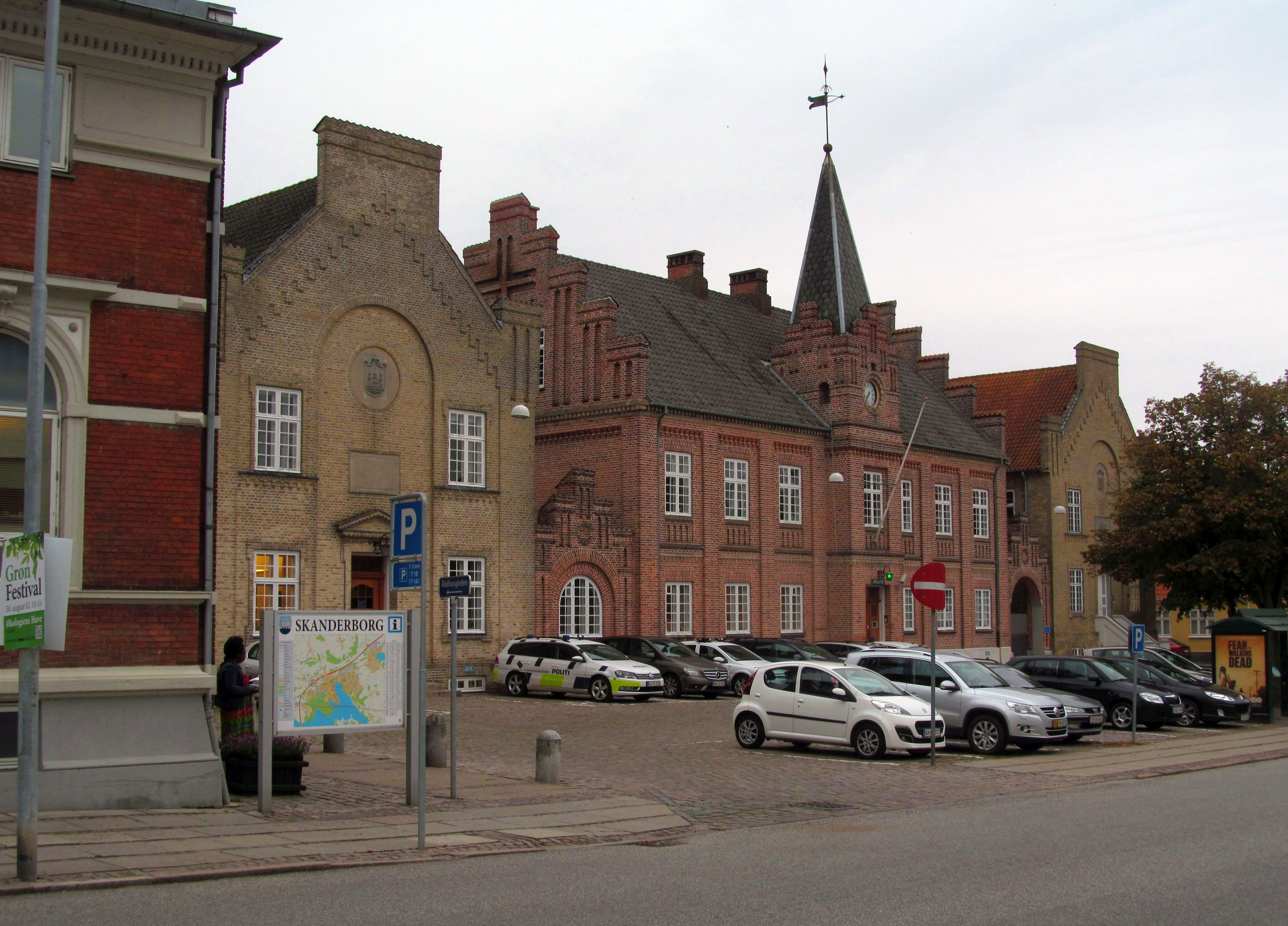
Skanderborg police station in the former town hall

The town of Skanderborg has a total of three churches, and Skanderborg Castle Church used to be part of the former Skanderborg Castle.

The cultural centre of Kulturhuset, located in Byparken (the city park) in the center of Skanderborg, was designed by native architectural firm Kjær & Richter and built in 1998. It houses the former library of the town, theatre and concert halls, a cinema, a three-story foyer with changing exhibitions and a café. Surrounding the buildings, are a Greek theatre with 500 seats, a playground and a beach volley field, amongst other facilities, as the city park itself is perceived as part of the cultural centre.

The square of Højvangens Torv, in the northeastern parts of the town, is the center of the educational campus known as Campus Højvangen. The campus is the site of educational institutions such as a public school, a business college (an HHX institution), technical college (an HTX institution under Aarhus Tech), an adult educational centre, Skanderborg Gymnasium etc., situated in a sculpture park. The gymnasium was designed by architectural firm Friis & Moltke and built in 1973.

The Village of Sølund is an accommodation facility and home for people with extensive physical and mental handicaps. It is located within the park of Skanderborg Dyrehave near the pond of Lillesø, close to town. The main buildings were erected in 1935 and designed by architectural firm C. F. Møller Architects.

Skanderborg Museum has their headquarters at Adelgade 5, a former bailiff (Danish: foged) house from the mid 18th century. The buildings are located in the oldest parts of the town, next to the pond of Lillesø. The Museum functions as an umbrella organisation for several museums in and around the town of Skanderborg, including Museet på Adelgade, Øm Kloster Museum, Museet på Gammel Rye Mølle, Ferskvandsmuseet and Skanderborg Bunkerne. Skanderborg Bunkerne is a World War II museum, fitted out in the abandoned German bunkers in Skanderborg Dyrehave. The German Luftwaffe built their Danish headquarters here and one of the bunkers later found use as the command centre for the civil defence agency during the Cold War era. Øm Kloster Museum is located outside the town, at the old ruins of Øm Abbey on the northern brink of lake Mossø. Skanderborg Museum is the responsible organisation for archaeology and archiving of the cultural history within the municipality.

== Nature ==
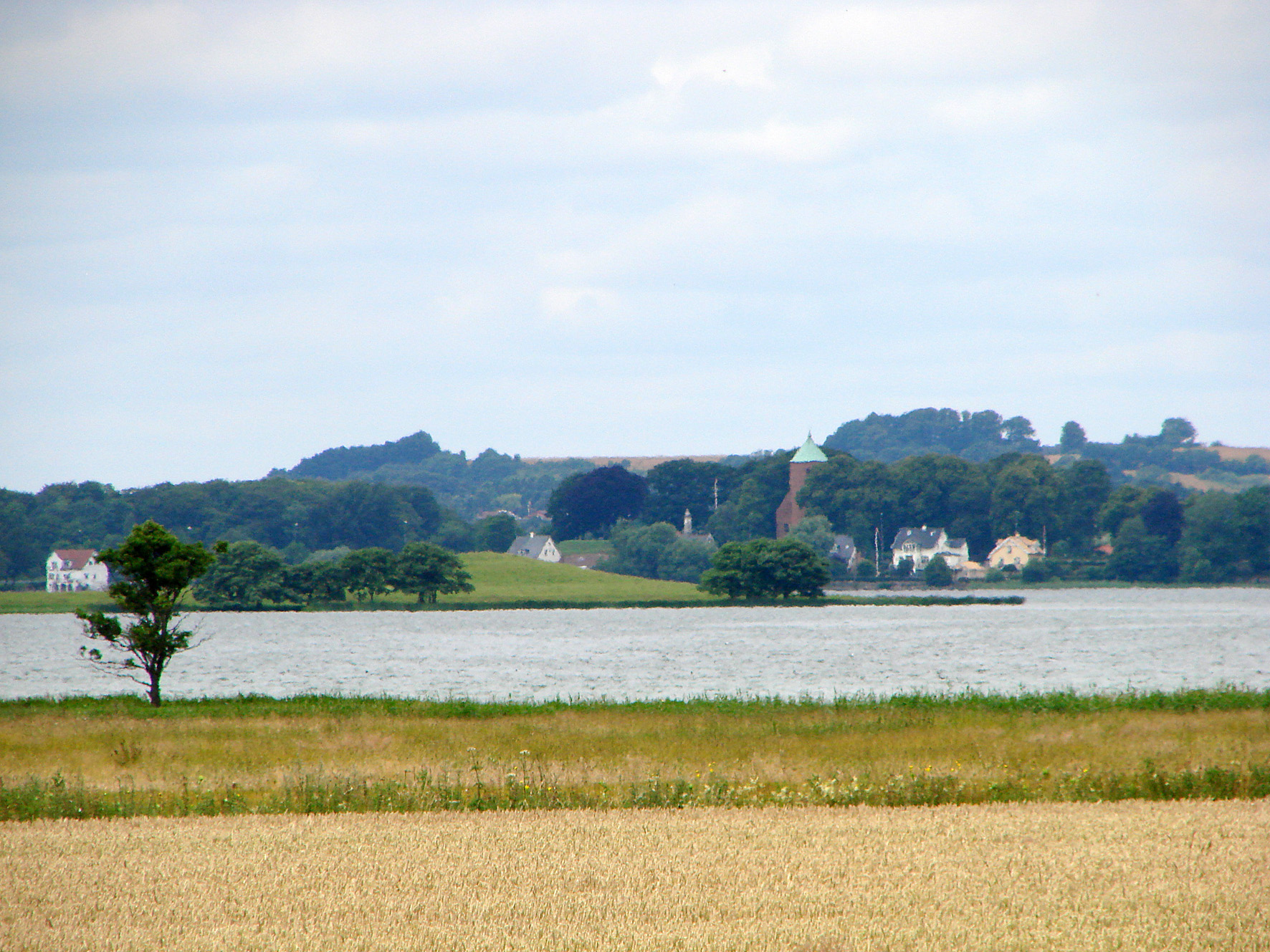
Skanderborg Lake as seen from the northeast, with Kalvø and the remaining red brick castle church, once associated with Skanderborg Castle. The beech trees behind the church are the outskirts of Skanderborg Dyrehave.

=== The deer park ===
In the southern part of the town is the deer park of Skanderborg Dyrehave, located within Skanderborg Forest. The deer park was established around 1580 by King Frederik II to facilitate his interest in hunting. The park area was fenced and roe deer, red deer, wild boars and rabbits were released. Pheasants, gray partridge and turkeys were raised and pools and fishing ponds were dug.

=== The lake ===
Skanderborg Sø (English: Skanderborg Lake) was created during the last ice age and formed from a melting block of ice left behind; a so-called kettle hole. The lake has an irregular shape divided into two larger lake-areas known as Hylke and Store Sø respectively, with a total surface area of 8.6 square kilometers. The lake has an average depth of 8 meters and up to 18.8 meters at the deepest spot. It holds approximately 49.3 million cubic meters of freshwater 23.5 meters above sea level and empties into Mossø, by the short stream of Tåning Å in the west. There are a number of small isles in the lake; Kalvø, Æbelø, Sct. Thomas and Sct. Helene.

== Transportation ==
=== Rail ===
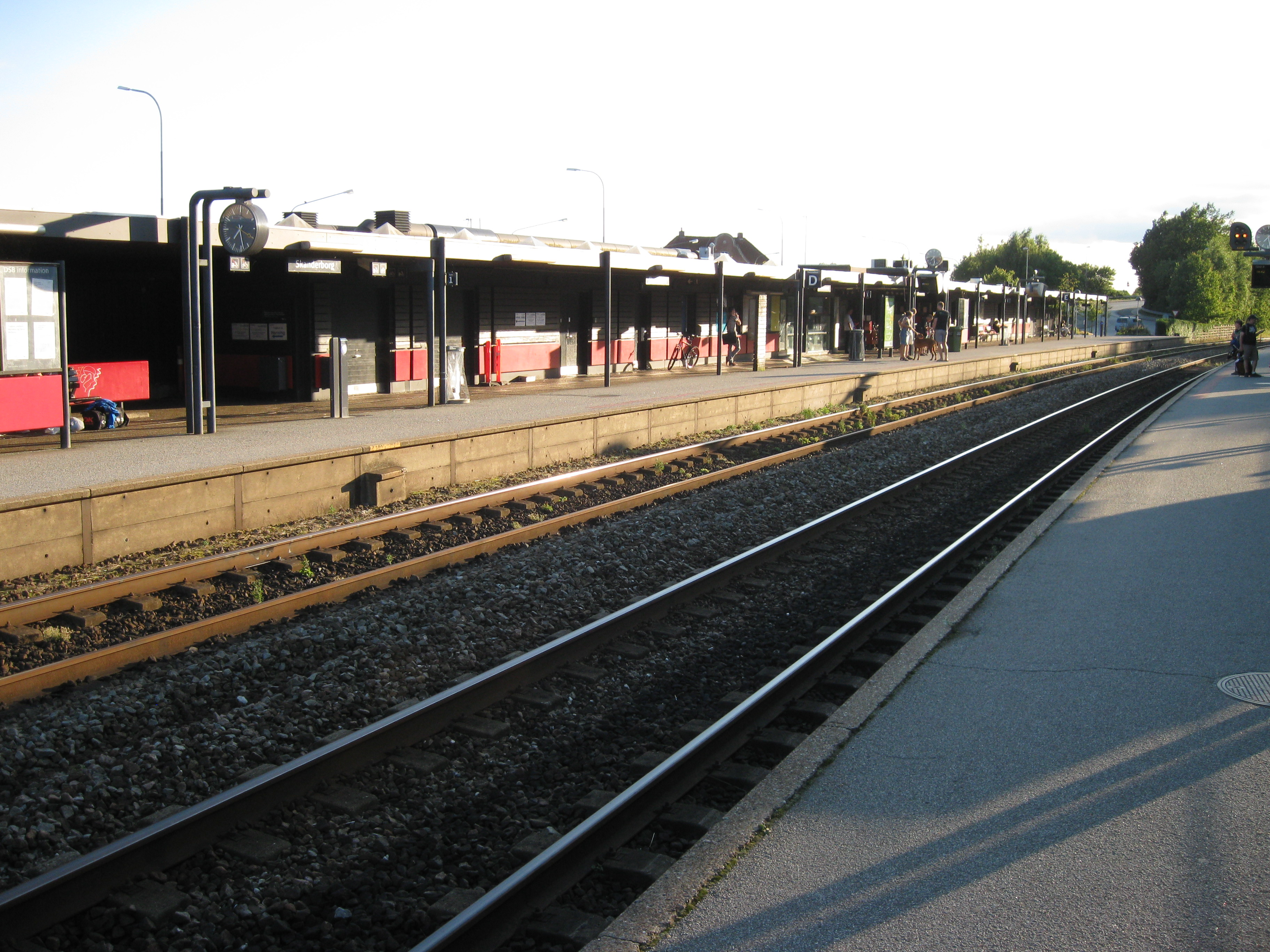
Skanderborg railway station.

Skanderborg is served by Skanderborg railway station. It is located on the Fredericia–Aarhus and Skanderborg–Skjern railway lines and offers direct InterCity services to Copenhagen, Aarhus, Aalborg and Frederikshavn and regional train services to Aarhus, Fredericia, Herning, Silkeborg and Skjern.

== Events ==
Since 1980, the Skanderborg Festival, an annual music festival, has been held in August in Skanderborg Dyrehave.

Every summer in June, Skanderborg also hosts a musical festival targeted specifically for people suffering from arrested development. Organised by the institution of Sølund, it claims to be the largest festival in the world of its kind.

== Notable people from Skanderborg ==
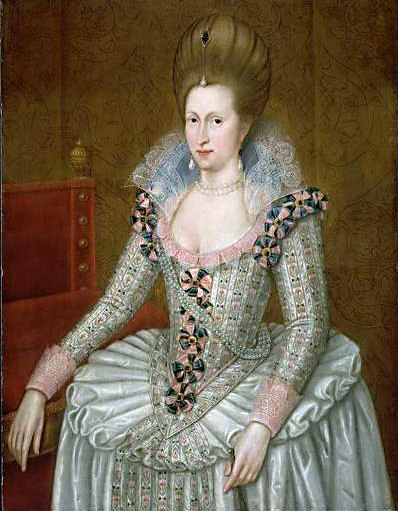
Anne of Denmark, 1605

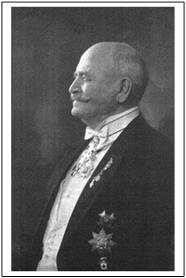
KA Koefoed

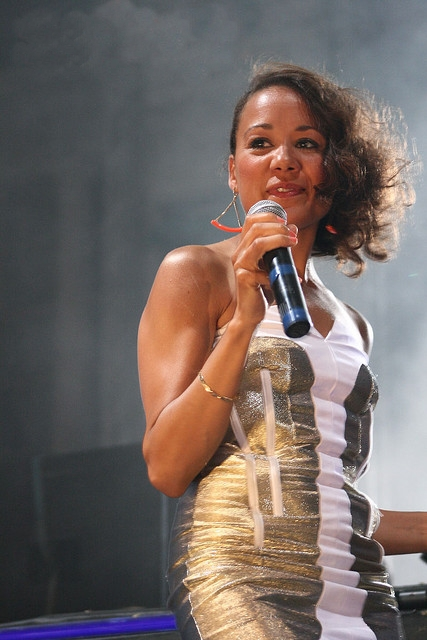
Camille Jones, 2008

=== Public service and public thinking ===
- Morten Børup (1446 in Skanderborg – 1526) an educator, cathedral cantor and Latin poet.
- Anne of Denmark (1574 in Skanderborg Castle – 1619 in Hampton Court Palace) daughter of King Frederick II of Denmark and Queen consort by marriage to King James VI and I.
- Carl Andreas Koefoed (1855 in Skanderborg – 1948) an agronomist active in Russia
- C. F. Møller (1898 in Skanderborg – 1988) an architect and academic at Aarhus School of Architecture
- Peder Tuborgh (born 1963 in Skanderborg) the Chief Executive of Arla Foods.

=== The arts ===
- Alma Fahlstrøm (1863 in Skanderborg – 1946) a Norwegian stage actress and theatre manager
- Holger Blom (1905 in Skanderborg - 1965), fashion designer.
- Ole Lund Kirkegaard (1940–1979) a Danish a teacher and writer of children's and youth literature; grew up in Skanderborg, the home of many of his characters
- Kirsten Lehfeldt (born Skanderborg 1952) award-winning actress, including the Robert Award and Bodil Award
- Christina Åstrand (born Skanderborg, 1969) a Danish violinist, became leader of the Danish National Symphony Orchestra aged 22
- Camille Jones (born 1973 in Skanderborg) a Danish pop singer, songwriter and record producer
- Johannes Torpe (born 1973 in Skanderborg) a Danish designer, musician, producer and former creative director of Bang & Olufsen
- Jøden (born 1974 in Skanderborg) stage name of Michael Mühlebach Christiansen, a rapper
- Peter Sommer (born 1974 in Skanderborg) a Danish singer and songwriter
- Monika Pedersen (born 1978 in Skanderborg) a Danish singer with Sinphonia and the Norwegian gothic metal band Sirenia
- Johanne Louise Schmidt (born 1983 in Skanderborg) a Danish stage and film actress

=== Sport ===
- Otto Wegener (1881 in Skanderborg – 1938) a Danish sports shooter, competed at the 1920 Summer Olympics
- Jens Jørn Mortensen (born 1927 in Skanderborg) a weightlifter, competed at the 1952 Summer Olympics
- Willy Skibby (born 1942 in Skanderborg) a former cyclist, competed in the 1976 Summer Olympics
- Amanda Sørensen (born 1985 in Skanderborg) a retired amateur BMX cyclist, competed at the 2008 Summer Olympics
- Hanne Skak Jensen (born 1986 in Skanderborg) a Danish tennis player
- Claus Mogensen (born 1973), Danish handball player and coach and coach of the Faroe Islands women's national handball team
- Thomas Arnoldsen (born 2002), Danish Handball player

== Literature ==
- Peter Abildgaard: Orla Frøsnapper boede da i Skanderborg (in Danish)
- Jens Andersen: Ole Lund Kirkegaard: en livshistorie (in Danish)

== Sources ==
- Brian Patrick McGuire: Conflict and Continuity at Øm Abbey, Museum Tusculanum Press, 1976.
- Skanderborg Castle Chapel The National Museum of Denmark. Danish text with English summary available (p. 6263).
- Kalvø Monastery The National Museum of Denmark. (in Danish)
- Ring Abbey The National Museum of Denmark. (in Danish)
