= Dominican Priory, Helsingør =

Dominican priory in Helsingør, Denmark

Coordinates: 56.033°N 12.609°E

The Dominican Priory, Helsingør, also known as the Black Friars' Priory, Helsingør, was a house of Dominican friars in Helsingør, Denmark, established in 1441. It was confiscated by the Crown during the Reformation, together with all other property of the Catholic Church.

== History ==
In 1441, Christopher III donated a site to a group of Dominican friars. It was located on the west side of Skyttenstræde/Fiolgade and on both sides of Stengade, while its northern and eastern boundaries remain more uncertain. The priory was confiscated by the Crown during the Reformation. In 1536, Christian III presented it to the city of Helsingør for use as a hospital.

== See also ==
- List of Christian monasteries in Denmark
