= St. John's Priory =

St. John's Priory may refer to:

- St. John's Priory, Bergen, Norway
- St. John's Priory, Kalmar, Sweden
- St John's Priory, Trim, Ireland
- St. John's Priory, Viborg, Denmark
- St John's Priory, Wells, England
- Clerkenwell Priory, in present day Clerkenwell, London, formerly known as Priory of St John of Jerusalem
