= Glenstrup Abbey =

Former Benedictine monastery in Denmark

Coordinates: 56.584°N 9.852°E

Glenstrup Abbey was a Benedictine monastery occupied briefly at various points during its history by the Carthusians as Glenstrup Charterhouse and by the Bridgettines. The abbey was located at Glenstrup near Randers, Denmark.

== History ==
=== Benedictine monks ===
Glenstrup Abbey, dedicated to the Virgin Mary, was founded about 1125 on Glenstrup Lake, near the town of Hobro, as a Benedictine monastery. The nobleman Svend Bo and his wife Inger Thott gave property and several farms to support it in the mid-12th century. In some records it was nicknamed "Nørre Abbey". It was built on the site of a holy spring called Maria's Spring in medieval times. The location was a religious one in Viking times and the abbey was most likely constructed on the site of a stave chapel built to Christianize the place in the late 11th century.

The monastery was built in the traditional three ranges attached to a church as a four-sided enclosure. The massive Romanesque tower was an unusual feature on the west front of the abbey church.

Few records about the abbey survive. It is mentioned in a papal bull of the mid-13th century, probably issued by Pope Alexander III.

At its height the abbey owned many farms, two mills, and several churches from which it collected tithes. It also owned the permanent rights to fish eels from the lake, where it built a permanent eel trap. It also had the rights to income from the fair or market held on Lady Day, which was held in nearby fields as late as 1552.

The abbey however eventually entered a long slow decline which culminated in its closure in 1431. Although records are sparse, this was apparently caused by a combination of lack of revenue and declining religious standards which meant that there were no novices. Ulrik, Bishop of Aarhus, decided that the house had become unruly and that to maintain it would cost the diocese more than it brought in; the last Benedictine monks were therefore removed, and an effort made to interest another order in the premises.

=== Glenstrup Charterhouse ===
At the suggestion of King Erik of Pomerania, Bishop Ulrik granted the abbey and the income properties from the recently closed Priory of Our Lady in Randers to the Carthusian Order for the establishment of a new charterhouse in the Diocese of Aarhus in 1429. The Carthusians briefly settled at the vacant Glenstrup Abbey, creating Glenstrup Charterhouse, but abandoned the site by 1441.

=== Benedictine monks ===
Bishop Ulrik then attempted to re-establish a Benedictine community, but the effort was short-lived, and the Benedictines left Glenstrup for the final time before 1445.

=== Bridgettine nuns ===
Bishop Ulrik then granted the abbey and its attendant properties to the newly established Bridgettine Mariager Abbey. In the mid-15th century, the Bridgettines were regarded as a reforming order capable of reviving the religious zeal that many houses had lost and restoring the strict standards many had abandoned. However, they were interested only in the Glenstrup estates and demolished the abbey buildings shortly after 1445, leaving only the church intact.

== Sources and external links ==
- Glenstrup Abbey (in Danish)
- Glenstrup Abbey in Salmonsens Konversationslexikon, nd. (in Danish)
