= Otto Wegener (sport shooter) =

Danish sports shooter (1881–1938)

Personal information
- Born: 3 February 1881 Skanderborg, Denmark
- Died: 2 April 1938 (aged 57) Aarhus, Denmark

Sport
- Sport: Sports shooting

Otto Wegener (3 February 1881 – 2 April 1938) was a Danish sports shooter. He competed in three events at the 1920 Summer Olympics.
