= Niels Peter Bornholdt =

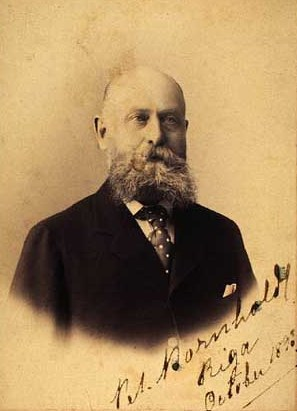
Peter Bornholdt

Niels Peter Anton Bornholdt (3 April 1842 in Hjørring – 17 May 1924 in Riga) was a Danish shipping agent and landowner, father of Magnus Creagh-Bornholdt and Vera Lalitia Bornholdt, who was married to Count Hieronim Mohl.

== Early life ==
Bornholdt was the son of Jens Welling Limschou (1794–1866) and Augusta Sophie Johanne Bornholdt (1810–1876) and was educated as a shipbroker in England.

== Career ==
In 1872, Bornholdt opened a ship handling business (P. Bornholdt & Co.) in Riga, took care of chartering and within a decade grew considerably. Besides its headquarters in Riga it had branch offices in Libau, Reval, Saint Petersburg and Windau . In 1878 the company had agents in Libau and later in Riga and the other Russian ports on the Baltic Sea.

World War I almost destroyed the company, but Bornholdt rebuilt it after the war, and closed the branch in St. Petersburg.

== Personal life ==
Bornholdt married Mary Emily O'Moore Creagh of Cahirbane (1841–1910) in November 1871, in Saint Petersburg. Mary was the daughter of Captain James Creagh (1784–1857) and Grace Emily O'Moore (died 1891) of County Clare, Ireland. Bornholdt kept in touch with Denmark and passed long holidays there. To get a more permanent residence in the country in 1901 he bought the Løvenholm manor, which he owned until 1918.

Bornholdt acquired Løvenholm Castle, and was awarded the Knight cross of the Order of the Dannebrog in 1889, He was Councillor of State in 1899, He was awarded Order of the Dannebrog Commander of the 2nd degree in 1922. He also wore a number of Russian and other awards.

He is buried in Riga.

== Sources ==
- Bornholdt, P. in Kraks Blå Bog, published by Ove Krak (1910)
- Danish Biographical lexicon 2nd edition (Volume 3, 1934), authored by Jens Vestberg, and the third edition (1979–84, included in SDE)
