= Nysted Friary =

Coordinates: 54°39′56″N 11°44′14″E

Nysted Friary (Danish: Nysted franciskanerkloster), located in Nysted, on the island of Lolland in southern Denmark, now in Guldborgsund municipality in Region Sjælland, was the last occupied Franciscan friary in Denmark after the Reformation.

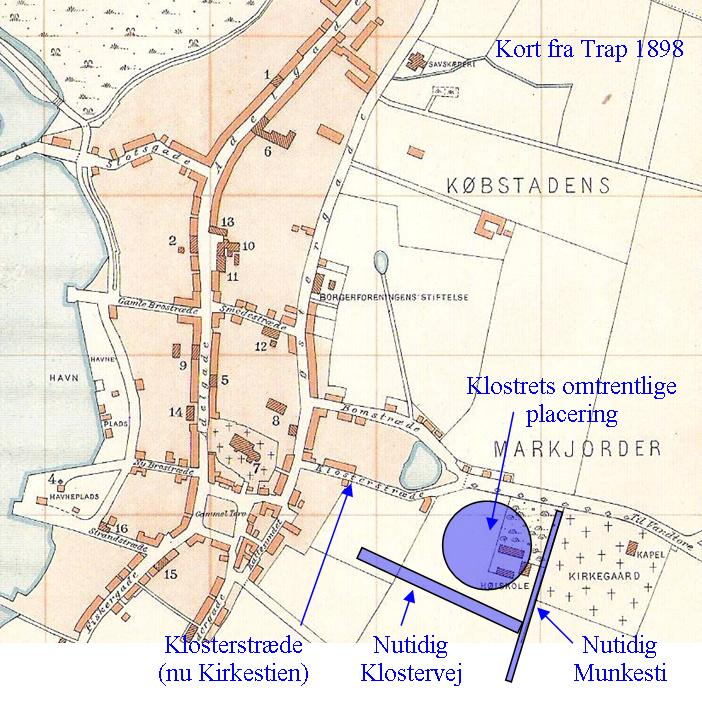
A location map

== History ==
=== Foundation to dissolution ===
Nysted Friary was founded in 1286 in the coastal town of Nysted on land donated by the lords of Kærstrup and Kjeldstrup farms. It was one of the earlier friaries in Denmark, under the jurisdiction of the Custody of Odense in the Franciscan Province of Dacia. It must have been one of the more prominent houses because the annual chapter meeting of the Franciscans in all of Scandinavia was held there six times between 1283 and 1415, but after that year it was only held there twice more, perhaps because other houses had become more important, and there were simply many more Franciscan establishments in the province.

The friary was built just east of the town of Nysted in a traditional quadrilateral pattern with four wings around a central cloister, with a chapel forming one of the sides.

The friary also had a hospital which kept a mortality book to record the deaths. While the book itself has not survived it is referred to in other documents. What makes this significant is that the hospital accommodated important members of the Danish court and noble families who were ill, among them bishop Valdemar Podebusk, Lyder Colbaltus Kabel, and Anders Sjundesen of Kærstrup, perhaps a descendant of the founders of the friary.

In the late 15th century the Franciscans at Nysted were divided by the ongoing conflict that regularly plagued the entire Franciscan order, over how strictly they should interpret the original Rule of Saint Francis, and especially the vow of poverty. The Observants insisted that the monks should conform to the strict rule, and so should avoid owning property and wealth. The Conventuals argued for a more liberal interpretation of the rule, and for a little more comfort as the friary's wealth and income increased. In 1477 the conflict came to a head when the Observants beat up the Conventuals and threw them out of the friary. Two years later the Conventuals in their turn chased the Observants out with cudgels. In time the rift healed, but the stricter interpretation of the rule was enforced until the Reformation.

In 1483 the friary sold off two of its properties to Herr Eskil Gøje. The next year the friary sold its remaining smaller properties including a smallholding and a field in nearby towns.

The single most important document remaining is the Nysted Martyrology, a list of saints' days for the entire year. It was lost during the dissolution of the friary until 1959, when it was located in a library in The Hague in the Netherlands. It is one of only four surviving from the entire medieval period in Denmark.

=== Dissolution ===
The Reformation brought an end to Nysted Friary. Frederik I and his son, Duke Christian, later Christian III, ordered the closure of Franciscan houses in 28 Danish towns beginning in 1527. Just two years later Nysted was the last one remaining. Many Danes vented their anger against the Catholic Church on the most visible representatives, the multiple monastic houses which were to be found in towns of any importance. The Franciscans were targeted first because their constant appeals for food, clothing, money, and labor seemed an added burden to the tithes, fees, and rents already paid to the church by Danish peasants. The tragic circumstances of the expulsion by force of the Franciscans town by town were recorded by a Franciscan friar in "Krønike om Gråbrødrenes Udjagelse af Danmark" ("The Chronicles of the Hounding-out of the Gray Friars from Denmark").

A story recorded about Nysted Friary at the time is that when the local district governor was required to make an inventory of its valuables, four gilded silver chalices, four gilded cups, and three small white silver spoons were missing, as the friars had buried their valuables to be retrieved in better times, but the governor demanded their return and confiscated them.

Unlike many other places, the Franciscans were able to remain in the friary until 1538. In fact it was the last outpost of the Franciscans in Denmark. Denmark became officially Lutheran in October 1536 when Christian III and the State Council adopted the Lutheran Ordinances. Nysted Friary remained open until 1538 when the last monk, Lutke Naamensen, is recorded as still there. Later that same year the friary was closed.

=== After dissolution ===
The buildings were ordered to be demolished in 1551, when two of the bells from the chapel were taken down and re-hung in Nysted parish church. In 1577 the ruins could still be seen, but from that time on, the stone and bricks were carried off for the construction of local buildings. As late as 1800 over 1,000 wagonloads of brick and stone were removed from the site, so that now even the foundation stones have vanished.

Excavations in the 1920s by the National Museum of Denmark found the site and a few burials. Perhaps the most important find was the seal of Chancellor Valdemar Podebusk who became a Franciscan before his death and burial at Nysted.

The site has been reused for modern building purposes.
