= Sebber Priory =

Danish religious house

Coordinates: 56.9624°N 9.5377°E

Sebber Priory (Sebber Kloster) was a religious house located at Sebbersund, near Nibe in northcentral Jutland, Denmark. The site is now occupied by Sebber Church as well as Sebber Kloster Golf Club and Sebber Abbey manor house.

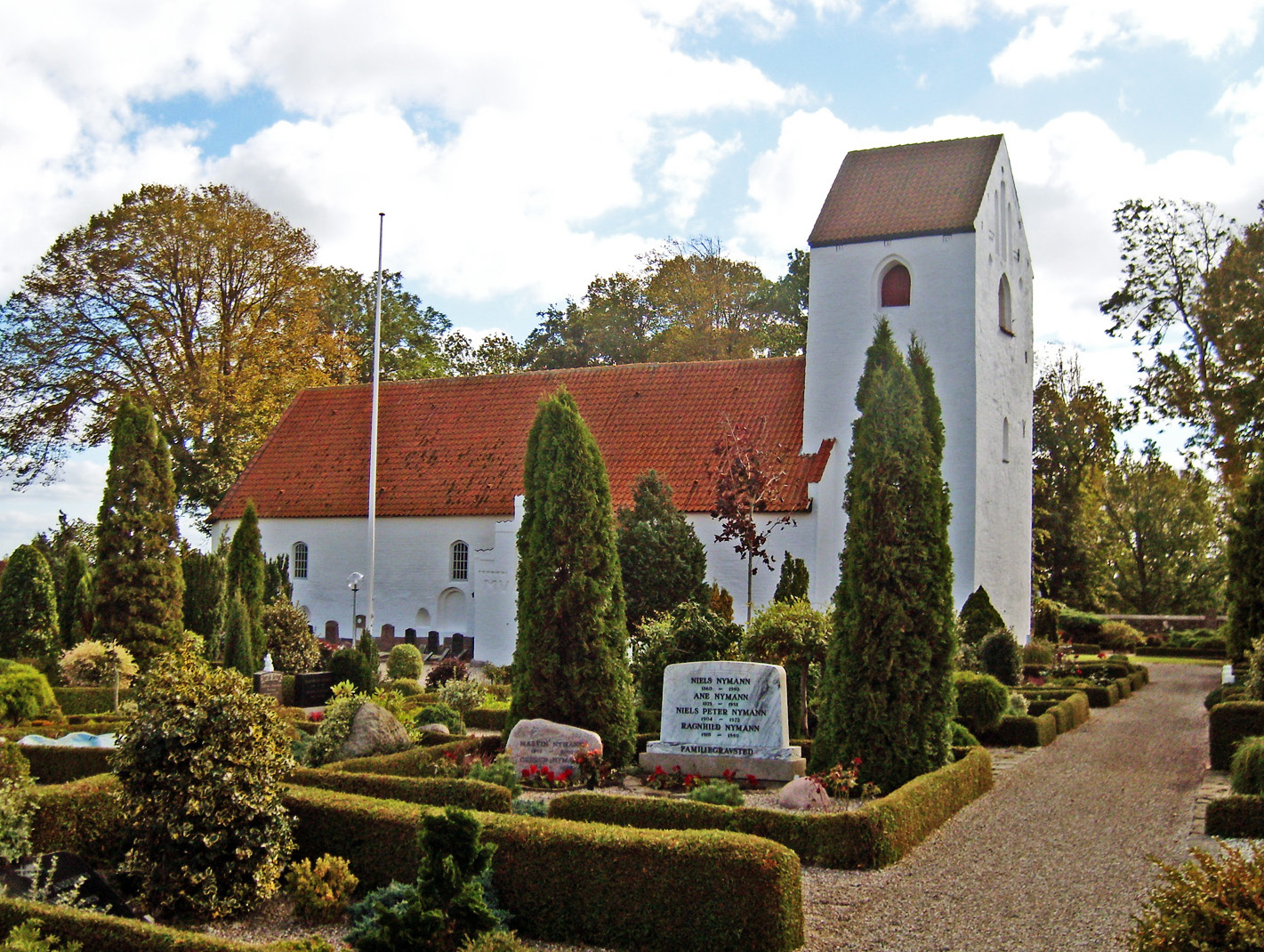
Sebber Church

== History ==
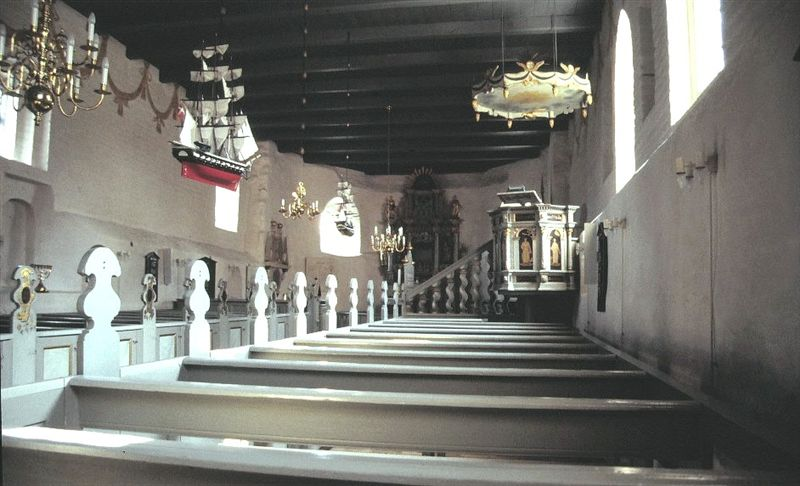
Interior of Sebber Church

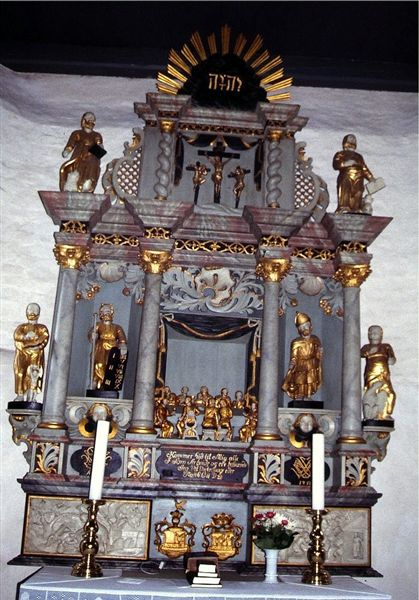
Altar of Sebber Church

Sebber Priory was established as early as 1250 and certainly before 1268 as a house for Benedictine nuns. The priory was dedicated to St Lawrence. Its founding details are uncertain; it may have begun as an Augustinian house.

It appears that Sebbersund was already a village in Viking times, a trading place for ships plying the Limfjord between the North Sea and the Baltic. Over 300 Viking age graves were found in one of the largest Viking cemeteries found to date on the same ground as the priory was built. Sebbersund seems to have historically been a religious site dating to pre-Christian times.

Sebber Priory was constructed in Gothic style of red brick, the most common building material of the time. The priory was built to house approximately 12 Benedictine nuns in a relatively isolated place where they could practice a contemplative life without interference from the outside world. The original monastery included a refectory, assembly hall, dormitory as well as the Priory church (Klosterkirken).

== Reformation in Denmark ==
The Reformation brought an end to Sebber Priory when King Christian III and the State Council adopted the Lutheran Ordinances, establishing Lutheranism as the state church in October 1536. The abbey and its estate reverted to the crown and was then given over to Christian Friis, a noble from Aalborg. In 1581 Sebber Kloster passed to Oluf Brockenhuus, who lived there until his death in 1608. In 1677 Major General Casper Christoffer Brockenhuus (ca. 1649 - 1713) became the sole owner of the estate. In 1697 Christoffer Brockenhuus sold the farm to the merchant (1647-1707). At his death, Jørgen Jensen Gleerup (1748 - 1798) took over Sebber Abbey (Sebber Kloster).

== Sebber Abbey ==
Subsequent generations consolidated the estate's economy and improved its operation. The manor has been owned by the Tesdorf family since 1957. The main building of the manor burned down in 1959 and was rebuilt. In 2006, the manor underwent restoration and is now open for public occupancy.

== Sebber Church ==
The former monastery church is still preserved and operated as a parish church in the Diocese of Aalborg. Sebber Church (Sebber Kirke) was the main building of the medieval priory. It remains much as it was during the Middle Ages. The church is located in direct connection with Sebber Abbey and has a direct walking path to the main building. The baptismal font and crucifix date from the days when it was still a priory church.
