= Veng Abbey =

Former Benedictine monastery in Denmark

Coordinates: 56.11042°N 9.88164°E

Veng Abbey (Veng Kloster) was one of Denmark's earliest Benedictine monasteries. It was located in the village of Veng near Skanderborg, Region of Southern Denmark. Veng Church, the former abbey church, is still in use as a parish church and is the oldest remaining in the country.

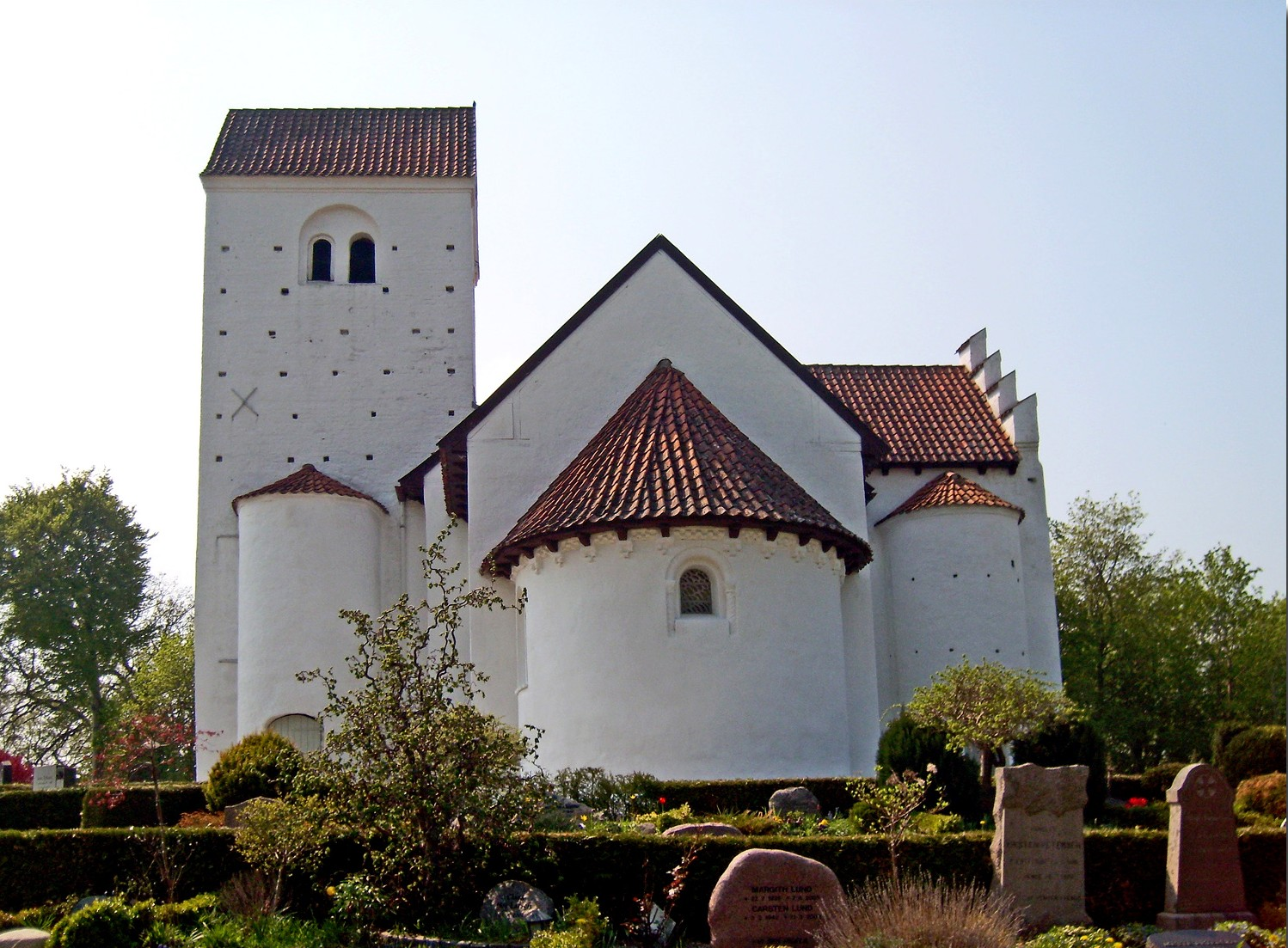
Veng Church

== History ==
Veng Abbey was established as a Benedictine monastery some time in the late 1060s, with connections to the royal forebears of King Valdemar I. By the 1160s the abbey had fallen into a severe decline: the original endowments failed to sustain it. Eventually Abbot Jens was brought before a church tribunal and forced to give up his office on the grounds of immorality and theft of the harvest. Three recalcitrant monks were all that remained at Veng. Sven, Bishop of Aarhus, received permission from Pope Alexander III to close the abbey. Just a year later Bishop Sven granted occupation of the empty premises to the Cistercian monks from Sminge Abbey, originally from Vitskøl Abbey, who were dissatisfied with the infertility of the soil at Sminge. They settled at Veng Abbey in 1166.

Lady Margrethe, the widow of a local nobleman, had petitioned Bishop Sven to convert Veng Abbey into a nunnery with herself as the abbess, a position which would bring with it a guaranteed annual income. When the Cistercians were confirmed at Veng, she did everything she could to make life miserable for them. She had her servants occupy the rent-producing farms that had belonged to Veng, and was accused of ordering one of her servants to steal the vestments from the church so that mass could not be said. Without income, the Cistercians had no choice but to leave, and in 1168 moved to another site on the small isle of Kalvø in Skanderborg Lake.

On Kalvø the soil proved useless for farming and in 1172 the monks moved yet again to found Øm Abbey (Øm Kloster), where at last they were able to develop a permanent site, so successfully that Øm Abbey soon overshadowed the earlier existence of Veng Abbey. The few archival letters regarding Veng were transferred to Øm Abbeyand the little information now available about Veng Abbey is due to their preservation there. The exact layout of the monastery complex has not been determined, but it is thought to have had at least two ranges, a dormitory, and a refectory attached to the church. Excavations in 1984 to determine the layout were unsuccessful.

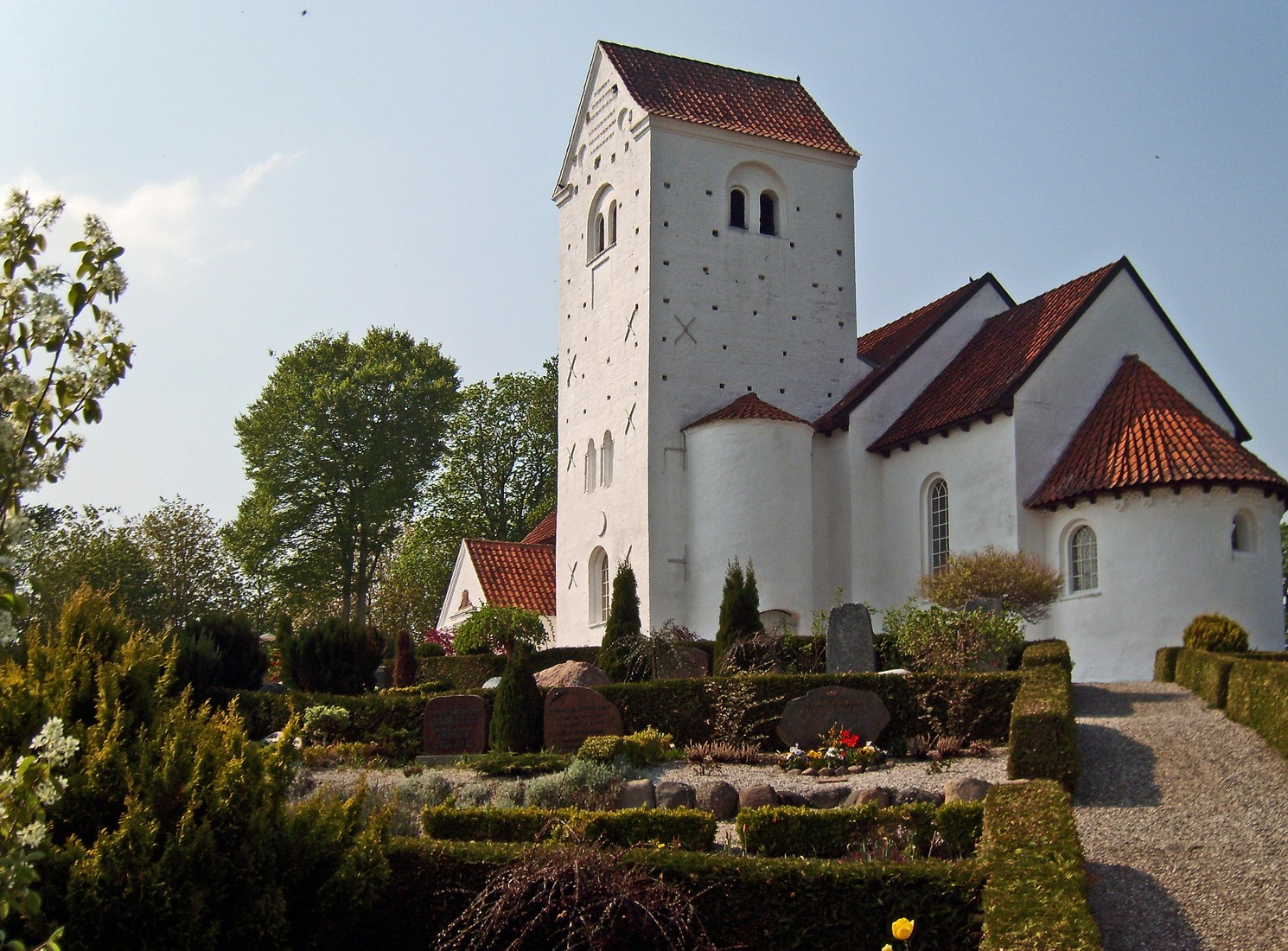
Veng Church

== Veng Church ==
Veng Church (Veng Kirke) was constructed some time after 1100, probably as a replacement for an earlier wooden structure. It was built of limestone blocks, as were many early Danish monasteries, in the Romanesque style. It had a flat timber roof, a single nave, a choir, and an apse with two transepts, each with its own apse. The outside of the church retains several carved stones and other decorations from the original building. Even before the Danish Reformation there were no remains of Veng Abbey except for the church. Veng Church is now a parish church in the Diocese of Aarhus.

== Other Sources ==
- Veng Abbey. Klosterriget ved Silkeborg. Silkeborg Turistbureau, 2008 (in Danish)
