= Ring Abbey =

Former Benedictine nunnery in Denmark

Coordinates: 56.0129°N 9.9652°E

Ring Abbey (Ringkloster) was a Benedictine nunnery in Skanderborg Municipality, Denmark. It was in operation from the 12th-century until the Danish Reformation. It was a large landowner and functioned as a girl school for daughters of the nobility.

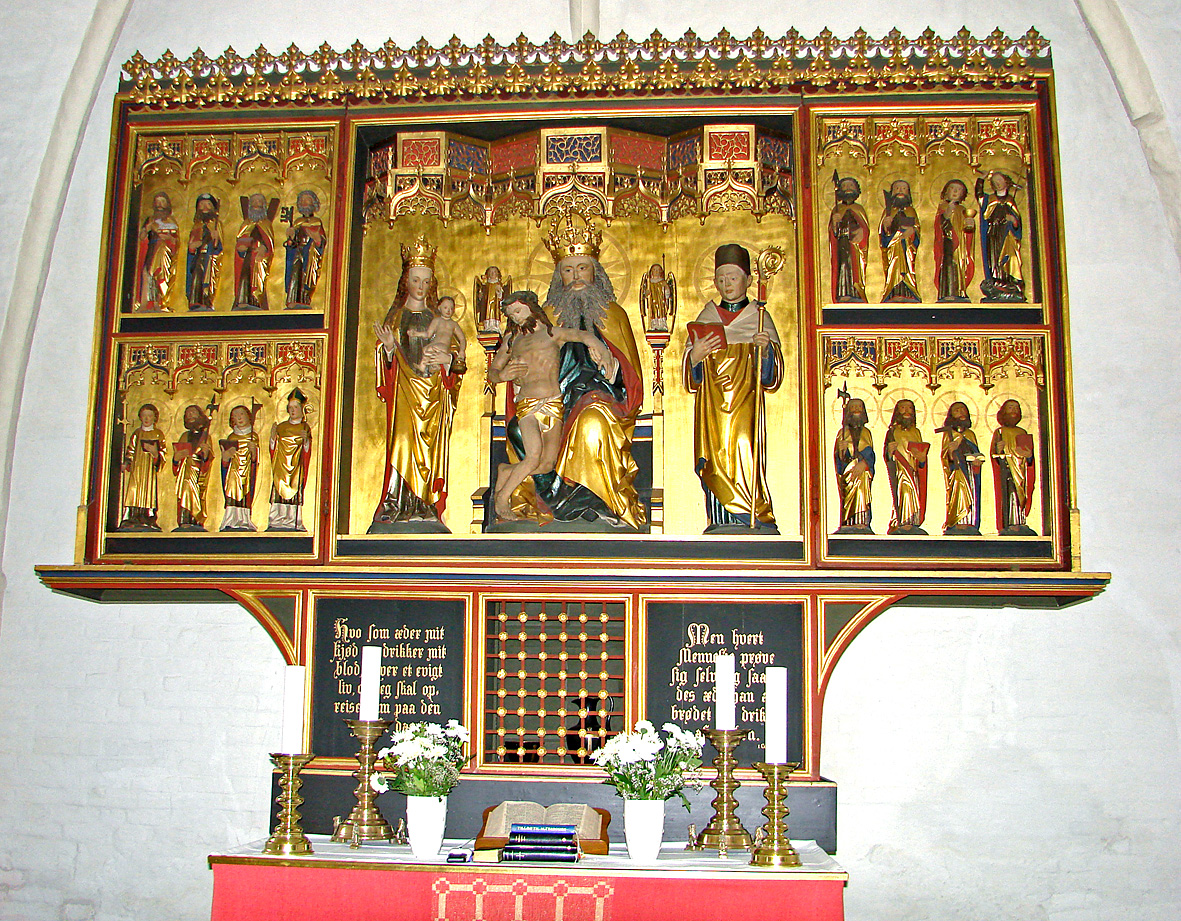
Altarpiece from Ring Abbey now in Østbirk Church

== History ==
Ring Abbey was likely founded in the 12th-century, possibly in the early 12th-century. It is mentioned in contemporary documents for the first time in 1203. The Abbey functioned mainly as a school for girls and a retirement home for elder women from the nobility.

Initially small, it became a substantial landowner through donations by the families of the noblewomen accepted as nuns in the Abbey. Eventually Ring Abbey owned estates located all over Jylland, mostly rented out to tenants of the peasantry, and had its own market place. The Abbey burnt down two times; in 1300 and in 1430, and was each time enlarged and rebuilt in stone.

During the Danish Reformation, Ring Abbey was confiscated by the crown and given to Lord High Treasurer Mogens Gøye and then to his son-in-law Admiral Herluf Trolle, who were forced to promise to support the remaining nuns, who were allowed to live in the building for life. In 1571, Ring Abbey were incorporated into Skanderborg parish, and in 1579 lost its market place.

The church at Ring Abbey was demolished and the materials used for the expansion and repair of Skanderup Church (Skanderup Kirke) in the Diocese of Haderslev. The altarpiece from 1487 is now in Østbirk Church (Østbirk Kirke) in the Diocese of Aarhus.

== Other sources ==
- Danmarks Kirker, hefte 48. Nationalmuseet 1997
- Danske Slotte og Herregårde, Aage Roussell (ed.), 2. udg., bind 13, Hassings Forlag, Kbh. 1966 p. 291-294
- Om ”De Gode Nonners Konvent i Ring” Om Ring Klosters Historie, 1998 (forfatter ukendt)
- Reinholdt, Helle: Dengang, historier fra Skanderborg-området. Skanderborg Museum, Narayana Press 2009 p. 70-75
