= Mundelstrup =

Village in east Jutland, Denmark

- Village
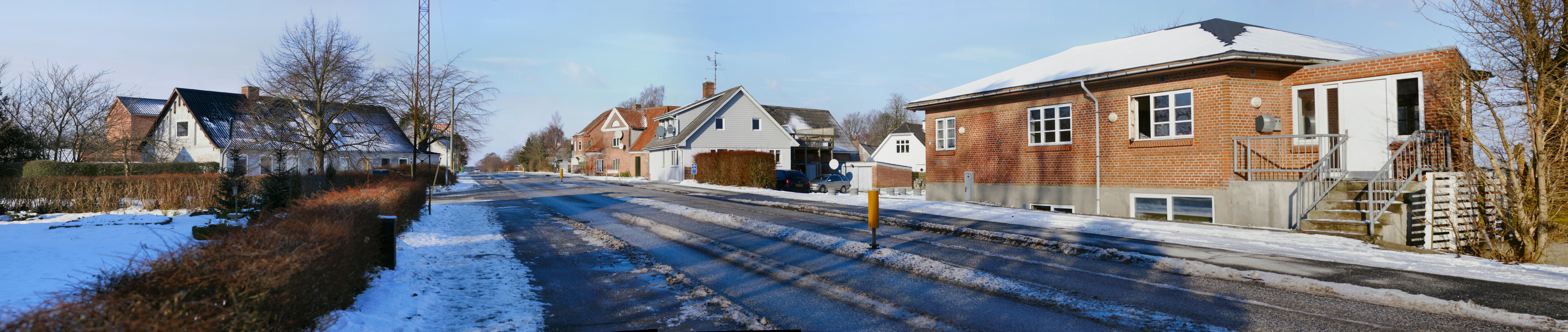
- Mundelstrup seen to the north on Gl. Viborgvej

- Location in Central Denmark Region Mundelstrup (Denmark)
- Coordinates: 56°11′51″N 10°3′59″E
- Country: Denmark
- Region: Central Denmark Region
- Municipality: Aarhus Municipality

Population (2026)
  - Total: 418

Mundelstrup is a village in east Jutland, Denmark, with a population of 418 (1 January 2026). It's located approximately 13 kilometres (8.1 mi) from central Aarhus.
