= Mariager Abbey =

Former Bridgettine abbey in Denmark

Coordinates: 56°38′53″N 9°58′44″E

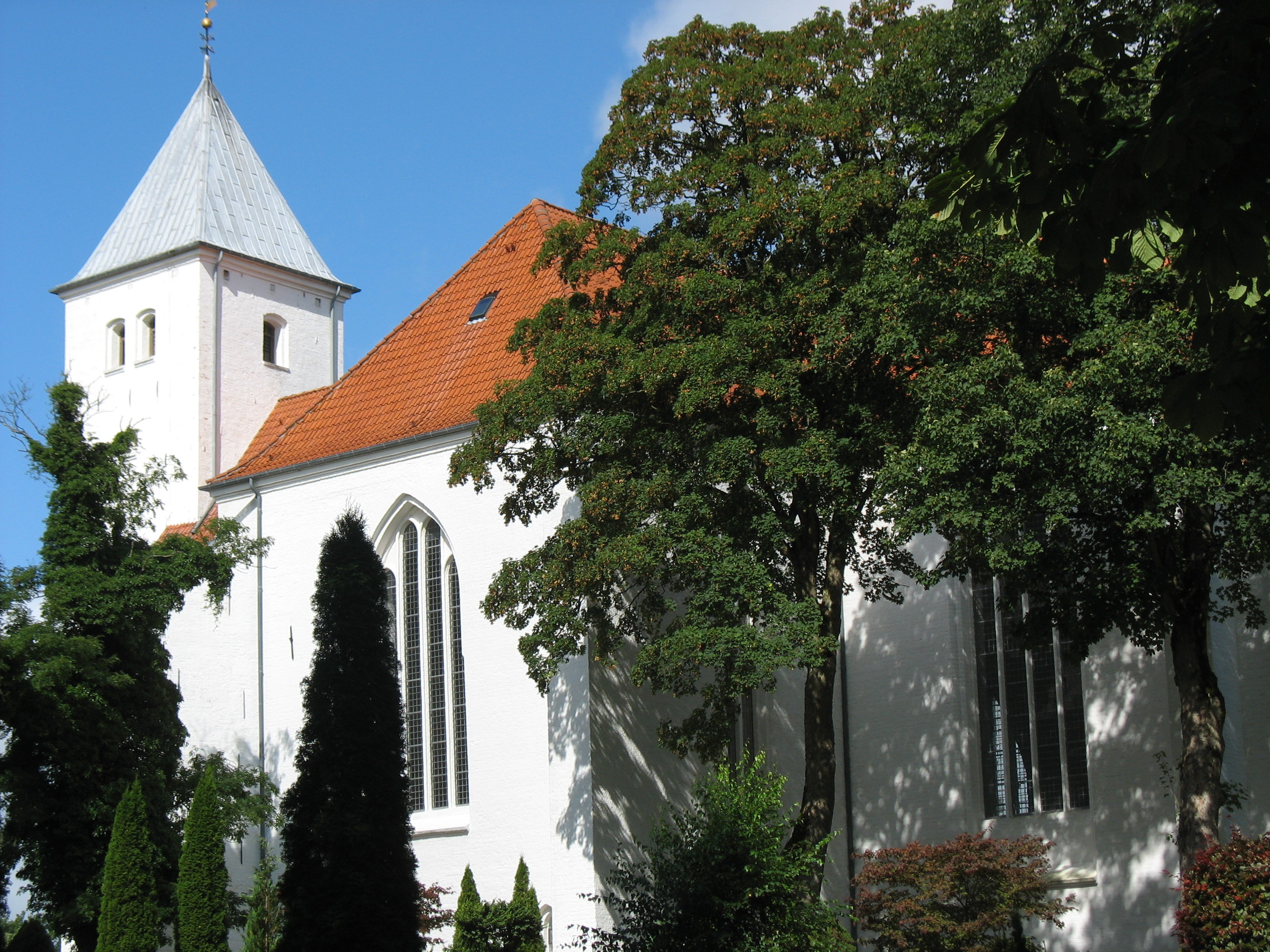
Mariager Kirke, the much reduced and altered former Mariager Abbey church

Mariager Abbey (Danish: Mariagerkloster) was a Bridgettine abbey founded in 1430 which became an important pilgrimage site, in the present town of Mariager in northern central Jutland, Denmark.

== History ==
=== Foundation ===
Mariager Abbey was founded in 1430 on a hill overlooking the ferry across Mariager Fjord by the Bridgettines, the last monastic order to reach Denmark before the Reformation, on land acquired in the late 1420s from the dissolved Randers Abbey. Tradition has it that the abbey was founded by several noble families in Eastern Jutland. Sources disagree on whether the abbey was founded from Maribo Abbey or from the Bridgettine mother house, Vadstena Abbey in Sweden.

Papal permission for a double abbey was granted in 1446. Funds were short however and the abbey was still uncompleted in 1468 when King Christian I wrote to the pope asking for help in completing it. Christian I contributed himself by giving the Order the right of harbourage over the landing place next to Hobro Vig in 1449. Subsequent kings of Denmark - Hans, Christian I and Frederick I - all provided additional income through grants of rent rights over the next few decades. Further income came from noble families who followed the royal lead by giving farms and income properties to the abbey. At its high point the abbey owned farms, businesses, parts of towns and income from churches.

=== Development ===
The abbey church rapidly became a pilgrimage site where people could come to receive absolution. It has been suggested that the source of this fame was because of relics deposited for the "veneration of the faithful", perhaps something connected to Saint Bridget but to date no specific evidence of this has been located. The name "Mariager" ("Maria's Field") was first used in 1446 when the pope officially recognized the establishment of the abbey. Nobles, merchants, and wealthy farmers began buying burial sites or building chapels, so they could be buried on the grounds. The monastery received properties and donations from people for services. The town of Mariager grew up around the monastery, which was influential in the region due to the many farms it owned.

The Gothic abbey church was completed about 1480 and was one of the largest churches in Denmark. It was 75 m long, 32 m wide and 25m high in the nave. The two side aisles were 15 m high. It was unusual because it had two choirs, the larger on the east for the nuns on a gallery high up between the pillars on the second and the third span, and a smaller on the west for the monks on the ground floor.

=== Dissolution ===
The Bridgettines were the last monastic order to appear in Denmark. Consequently, Mariager Abbey existed for just over a hundred years before the majority of Danes rejected the institutions and customs of their long Catholic past. During the Reformation Mariager Abbey became crown property, in 1536, but was allowed to continue to operate until 1588, part of the time as a home for unmarried noble women. The church became a Lutheran parish church. The estates were sold or given away by the crown and the buildings fell into disrepair.

In 1721-1722 and 1724 most of the dilapidated abbey buildings were demolished and the materials used for repairing homes and farm buildings. The north range was converted into a residence for the parish bailiff and then restored in the 1891. The influence of the town of Mariager was greatly reduced, and at one time only 400 people lived there.

In 1788 the former abbey church was partially demolished and the current building was constructed around the west choir. The resulting church was about one quarter of the size of the medieval church. The current church serves as a partial reminder of the magnificent buildings that once stood on the hill above the fjord.

== Sources ==
- Mariagerkirke website: Mariager Kloster (in Danish)
- Salmonsens Conversationslexikon, 1915-30, p.604: Mariager Kloster (in Danish)
