= Alling Abbey =

Benedictine monastery in Viborg County, Denmark

Coordinates: 56.267°N 9.607°E

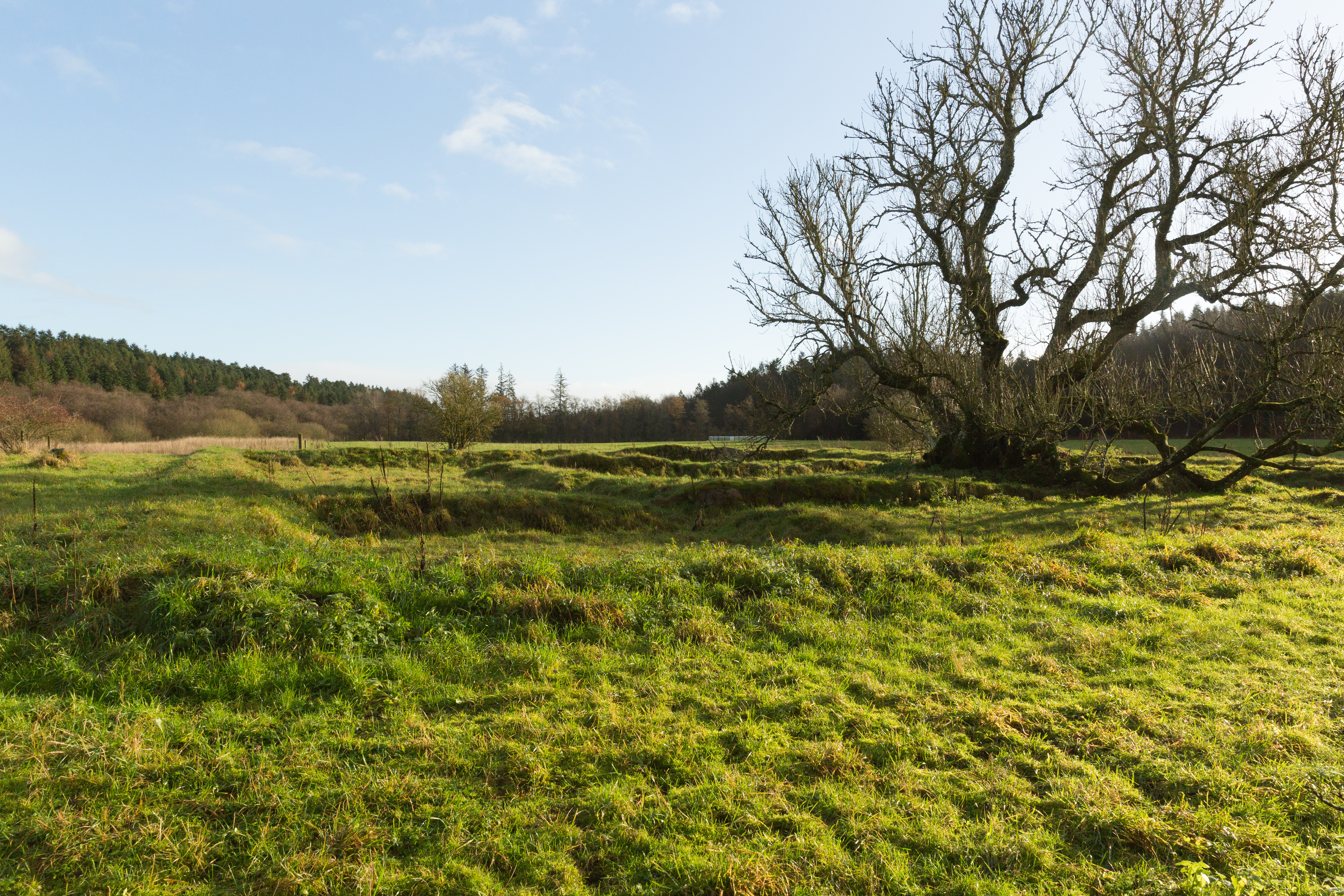

Alling Abbey (Alling Kloster) was one of the last Benedictine monasteries to be built in Denmark. Alling Kloster was located north of Silkeborg in the parish of Svostrup in Viborg County.

== History ==
Alling Abbey was built at the lower end of Alling Lake sometime before 1250. There was a connection between the closure of the monastery at Vejerslev in 1231 and the building of the abbey at Alling which was partially filled with monks from Vejerslev. The constructed abbey is mentioned first in 1250. The abbey was constructed in the familiar pattern. Three ranges adjoined St. Hans Church forming a four-sided enclosure to separate the monks from the world. The east range contained the chapter hall and dormitory. The north range was the refectory, work area, perhaps scriptorium, and cellars for storage. The west range housed the lay brothers who lived in the abbey and performed much of the worldly work required to keep the monastery operating. To the south was St. Hans Church, with a single nave, choir and angular apse.

Since the abbey was isolated from any town, the church was used only by the monks or occasional travellers. Women were not permitted, except on holy days. A canal was dug from Grønbæk to bring fresh water to the monastery and then carry it off to Alling Lake. Over the centuries the abbey came into possession of many farms and owned the rights to most of the churches in the area. For much of the time, the abbey had running disputes with the Bishops of Aarhus over income properties.

== Post Reformation ==
The Danish Reformation in 1536 brought all religious institutions and their income properties to the crown. In 1538 the last Abbot, Hans Lauridsen, turned the keys over to Johannes Hŏcken, a secular nobleman (lensmand) to look after the king's interest in the property. He then took off his habit and became the first Lutheran priest in Grønbæk and Svostrup parishes. The monks were permitted to remain for a time until the abbey was closed sometime before 1540. The property was mortgaged to Johan Hŏcken in 1539 and 1543. The mortgage was redeemed by Jakob Berthelsen, bailiff of Silkeborg Castle (Silkeborg Slot) in 1573 and the entire abbey was razed for the building materials that could be sold from the site. The archives of the abbey were moved to Silkeborg Castle, inventoried in the late 16th century, and then disappeared. A few letters between abbots and other church leaders exist in the State Archive.

== Excavations ==
Several excavations identified the abbey's precise location, so that it has been completely mapped. The ruins of the monastery were exposed through archaeological investigations conducted by the National Museum of Denmark in 1894 and 1942. In 1989 the monastery's floor plan was clarified with protective turf ramparts, which now hide the otherwise exposed masonry. The site has been protected as a national historic location since 1901. Portions of the foundation have been left exposed so visitors can see how the abbey was laid out.

== Other Sources ==
- Martin Berntson (2003) Klostren och reformationen. Upplösningen av kloster och konvent i Sverige 1523-1596 (Artos & Norma Bokförlag) ISBN 917217060-3
