= Sabro, Denmark =

Sabro
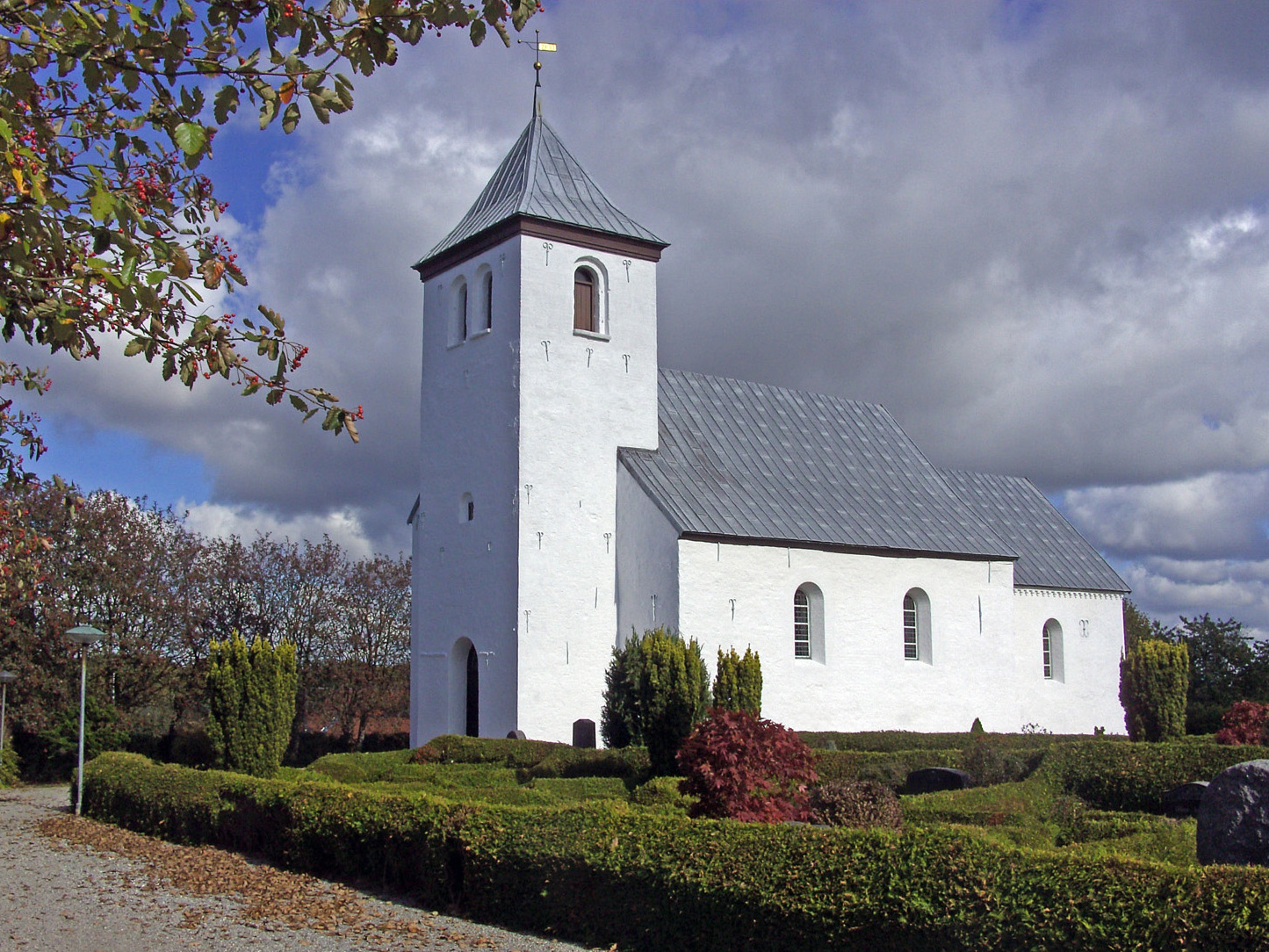

- Location in Denmark Sabro (Central Denmark Region)
- Coordinates: 56°12.7′N 10°02.2′E
- Country: Denmark
- Region: Central Denmark (Midtjylland)
- Municipality: Aarhus

Area
  - Urban: 1.6 km^{2} (0.62 sq mi)

Population (2026)
  - Urban: 3,562
  - Urban density: 2,200/km^{2} (5,800/sq mi)
- Time zone: Central Europe Time
- Area code: (+45) 8
- Website: www.aarhus.dk/da/omkommunen/english.aspx

Sabro is a suburb of Aarhus in Denmark. Its population is 3,562 (1 January 2026). It is located in the west of Aarhus Municipality, approximately 13 kilometres (8.1 mi) from central Aarhus.

Sabro has a sports club, football fields, a gym, grocery stores, hotels, restaurants, a church, two recreation centres, a dentist, a retirement home, a library, and a public day school, Sabro Korsvejskolen.

== Onomastics ==
The name was recorded in about 1150 as Sahebroch and in 1386 as Saubro.

== History ==
Sabro was originally one of the smaller villages in the area, with a few houses and farms south and west of Sabro Church.

After the road between Aarhus and Viborg (today Primærrute 26) was built through the area around 1890, a small settlement developed at the crossroads about 1 kilometre (0.62 mi) from the original village. In the mid-20th century the sogn (parish) councils of Borum-Lyngby, Lading and Sabro-Fårup (of which Sabro was part until 1 April 1970) decided to make this the location of a central school which was dedicated in 1964.

In the 1970s and 1980s the crossroads settlement and the original village merged, as part of a strong urban growth which has since continued eastwards, covering former agricultural land in the direction of the neighbouring village of Mundelstrup.
