= St. John's Priory, Viborg =

Former monastery in Denmark

St. John's Priory, Viborg (Danish: Johannitterklostret), was a monastery of the Knights Hospitaller in Viborg, Denmark.

== History ==
The principal abbey of the Knights of St. John, otherwise known as the Knights Hospitallers, at Antvorskov established several small houses in towns throughout Denmark in the late 13th century, one of them at Viborg. Apparently the first small monastic house (Johannitterbo) was built at Viborg at St. Ib's Church, which had been given to Antvorskov Abbey. Eleven years later the priory, with its church rededicated to Saint John (Danish: Sanct Hans) was founded nearby in 1285 by the Count of Everstein, who gave a property in Viborg to the Order of the Knights of St John of Malta, or Hospitallers. His widow Mariana also gave additional income property to the priory to fund its operations, especially the hospital. Subsequently, confusion has arisen between St. John's parish church and St. John's Priory church.

=== St. John's Priory church ===
The church formed the north range of a quadrangular abbey complex with refectory, dormitory, kitchens, guest house, and cellars. The church was 88 cubits long and 55 cubits wide, and was described by an observer as "grand". By 1527 a free-standing hospital (Sct. Hans Hospital) had been added to the complex. In 1458 a new larger building was constructed on the other side of St. Ib's Street.

St. John's Priory played a significant part in the Reformation in Denmark. Reform-minded Danes who had been to Germany and heard Luther or his ideas brought them back to Denmark in the mid-1520s. Among them was Hans Tausen, a Hospitaller who had studied in Germany and come back determined to spread the truth as he saw it to the people of Denmark. On Good Friday 1525 he preached Luther's ideas to the congregation at Antvorskov Abbey on Zealand, the headquarters of the Hospitallers in Scandinavia. The head of the order was scandalized by the rebellious monk and sent him to St. John's Priory in Viborg to contemplate his errors under the watchful eye of Prior Peder Jensen. Tausen eventually received permission to teach in the priory church and soon had a loyal and ardent following. His superior at St. John's protected him from the Bishop of Viborg who was prepared to arrest Tausen and put him on trial. But his ideas were too radical and he was expelled from his order and went to live with the Mayor of Viborg.

Tausen continued to preach, and the crowds who came to hear him grew so large that the prior was forced to let Tausen leave the priory. Tausen continued to preach to enormous crowds in the open. Danish weather is regularly damp and dreary and the mayor requested that Tausen be permitted to hold services in the priory church. In 1528 Bishop Jørgen Friis tried to have Tausen arrested by force but the crowds formed a cordon around him and chased away the bishop's men. They forced their way into the much larger Franciscan church to accommodate the growing numbers of people who wanted to hear Tausen and other Lutheran preachers. Less than a year later, Viborg had become mostly Lutheran and all Roman Catholic religious houses were closed. For a time Viborg became the center of the Reformation in Denmark. Monks either removed their habits and joined the reformers, or left the country.

=== After the Reformation ===
After the Reformation, the citizens of Viborg applied to King Christian III to decommission some of the town's several churches which were too costly to maintain. All churches, religious institutions, and the properties which they owned reverted to the crown in 1536. The antipathy of Viborg's Lutheran citizens against the monastery churches for their connection to the forcible attempt to suppress Hans Tausen and their fervent desire to rid themselves of Catholic custom and institutions explain why the "grand" church was chosen to be secularized. The crown gave the priory to the city of Viborg, which converted the buildings to other uses. In 1552 the priory became the location of the local court. In 1578 the court was relocated and the church was demolished and the materials used for restoration of the cathedral and the bishop's residence in Viborg.

== Sources ==
- Viborg Historie (in Danish)
