= Mossø =

Lake in Skanderborg, Denmark

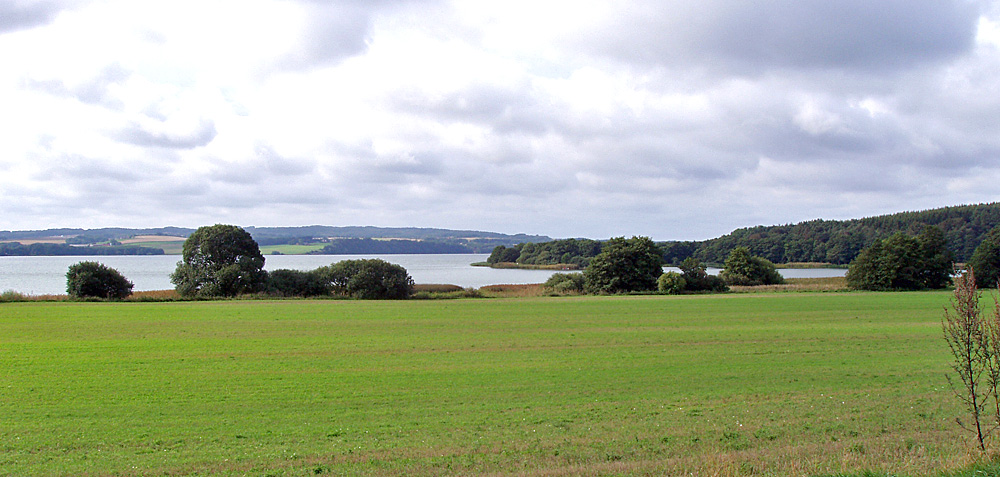
- Mossø as seen from the north-east.

- Location within Denmark
- Location: Skanderborg Municipality, Horsens Municipality
- Coordinates: 56°02′15″N 9°46′30″E
- Type: kettle hole
- Primary inflows: Gudenå, Tåning Å, Illerup Å
- Primary outflows: Gudenå
- Surface area: 16.5 km^{2} (6.4 sq mi)
- Average depth: 9 m (30 ft)
- Max. depth: 22 m (72 ft)
- Water volume: 151×10^{6} m^{3} (122,000 acre⋅ft)
- Surface elevation: 22.5 m (74 ft)
- Settlements: Skanderborg

Mossø is Denmark's third largest freshwater lake and Jutland's largest, as measured by surface area. The lake is located just west of the city of Skanderborg in east Jutland, but is part of both Skanderborg Municipality and Horsens Municipality. Mossø lies in the middle of the area and landscape known as Søhøjlandet (English: The Lake-highland).

There is a small lake named Mossø in the forest of Rold Skov in Himmerland.

== Nature ==
Both ospreys and white-tailed eagle is regularly observed at Mossø and the later have recently established here as a breeding bird, which is rare in Denmark.

Mossø is part of the 4,470 ha Natura 2000 protection area, designated as number 52. The lake is also designated as an international bird protection area, with number F35.

== Sources ==
- Statistical Yearbook 2013 Statistics Denmark
- Mossø and surrounding lakes National Survey and Cadastre of Denmark (KMS) 2012. Basic numbers. (in Danish)
- Mossø Skanderborg Municipality, Horsens Municipality, Danish Ministry for the Environment, 2008 (in Danish)
