= Friis =

Friis is a surname of Danish origin, meaning Frisian person. It may refer to any of the following people:

- Aage Friis (1870–1949), Danish historian
- Achton Friis (1871–1939), Danish illustrator, painter, and writer
- Agnete Friis (badminton) (1920–2013), Danish badminton player
- Agnete Friis (writer) (born 1974), Danish author
- Andreas Friis (1890–1983), Danish painter
- Astrid Friis (1893–1966), Danish historian
- Christen Friis (1581–1639), Danish politician
- Eigil Friis-Christensen (1944–2018), Danish geophysicist
- Elizabeth Friis, American bioengineer
- Else Marie Friis (born 1947), Danish botanist and paleontologist
- Emma Friis (born 1999), Danish handball player
- Erik Friis (1916–1983), Danish cyclist
- Frederik Ferdinand Friis (1793–1865), Danish architect
- Fredrik Friis (1923–2008), Norwegian singer-songwriter
- Hans Friis (1716–1762), Norwegian priest and poet
- Harald T. Friis (1893–1976), American radio engineer
- Heike Friis (1943–2015), Danish theologian and parish priest
- Henrik Friis Robberstad (1901–1978), Norwegian politician
- Ib Friis (born 1946), Danish botanist whose standard author abbreviation is Friis
- Jacob Friis (born 1976), Danish football player and manager
- Jakob Friis (1883–1956), Norwegian politician
- Jakob Friis-Hansen (born 1967), Danish football player
- Janus Friis (born 1976), Danish entrepreneur
- Jarle Friis (born 1964), Norwegian ice hockey player
- Jens Andreas Friis (1821–1896), Norwegian linguist
- Johan Friis (1494–1570), Danish statesman
- Jørgen Friis (died 1616), Danish statesman
- Jørgen Friis (bishop) (1495–1547), Danish Catholic priest
- Knud Friis (1926–2010), Danish architect
- Kristian Friis Petersen (1867–1932), Norwegian politician
- Lars Friis (born 1976), Danish football manager
- Live Foyn Friis (born 1985), Norwegian singer, lyricist and composer
- Lotte Friis (1988), Danish swimmer
- Lykke Friis (born 1969), Danish politician
- Martin Friis (born 1965), Norwegian ice hockey player
- Michael Pedersen Friis (1857–1944), Prime Minister of Denmark
- Nicolai Friis (1815–1888), Norwegian politician
- Nicolaus Christian Friis (1714–1777), Norwegian priest and theologian
- Niels Friis (died 1508), Danish bishop of Viborg 1498–1508
- Peder Claussøn Friis (1545–1614), Norwegian author
- Søren Friis (born 1976), Danish football player
- Torsten Friis (1882–1967), Swedish Air Force lieutenant general
- Vitus Friis (born 2007), Danish footballer
- Yan Friis (born 1952), Norwegian music journalist and comedian
