= Ancient Diocese of Viborg =

Roman Catholic diocese in Denmark (1065 - 1536)

Diocese of Viborg Dioecesis Wibergensis Viborg Stift
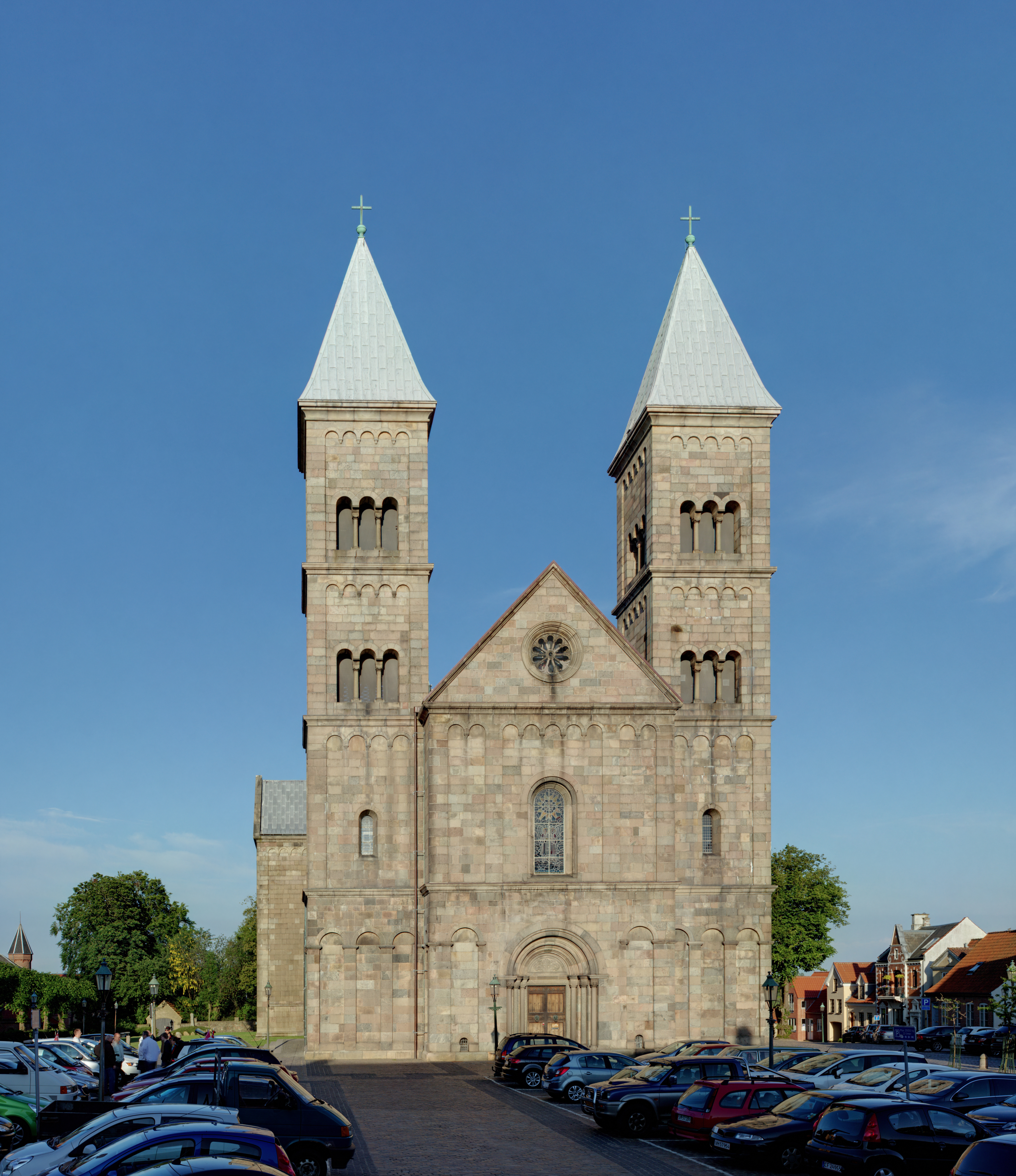
- Viborg Cathedral, seat of the bishop of Viborg.

Location
- Country: Denmark
- Ecclesiastical province: Lund
- Metropolitan: Archdiocese of Lund

Information
- Denomination: Roman Catholic
- Sui iuris church: Latin Church
- Rite: Roman Rite
- Established: 1060
- Dissolved: 1536
- Cathedral: Viborg Cathedral

The former Diocese of Viborg (Danish: Viborg Stift) was a Roman Catholic diocese in Denmark. It was established in 1065 and was dissolved in 1536 during the Protestant Reformation.

The region was originally part of the Diocese of Ribe, but split off to form its own diocese. Within its dominion, the diocese oversaw much of central Jutland, including the church's monasteries, friaries, and hospitals in that region. Following the dissolution of the diocese, the diocese was replaced by the Diocese of Viborg within the Church of Denmark.

== Domain ==
Before its establishment, the region fell under the jurisdiction of the Diocese of Ribe. The diocese comprised Viborg County, Aalborg, Slet, and the hundreds of Fleskum, Hornum, Hellum, Hindsted, Aars, and Gislum. The hundreds of Gjerlev, Onsild, Nörhald, and Stövring in the Randers County initially belonged to the Diocese of Viborg as well, though they were transferred to the Diocese of Aarhus in 1396.

Upon its completion in 1130, Viborg Cathedral in the city of Viborg served as the seat of the diocese's bishop. Nothing remains of the original 12th century cathedral but the crypt. The cathedral which stands on the site today was erected in 1876.

In Viborg, the diocese oversaw the Benedictine convent of St. Botolph, a Franciscan friary, a Dominican friary, as well as the hospitals of St. Michael and of the Holy Ghost. There were an additional Benedictine nunnery and a Franciscan friary in Aalborg which also fell under the dominion of the diocese. The Cistercian Abbey of Vidskild, the Augustinian abbey at Grinderslev, and the Augustinian convent of Asmild were all situated in the diocese, in addition to the Benedictine convent of Sibber, and the hospitals at Tesdrup and Karup.

== History ==
The diocese was founded in 1065, following the death of the Bishop of Ribe, Vale. It was originally a suffragan of the archdiocese of Hamburg-Bremen until 1104, when the Diocese of Lund was elevated to an archdiocese and became its metropolitan. The first Bishop of Viborg, Herbert, held the position until the turn of the 12th century. In 1080 King Canute IV endowed the bishopric and chapter. The latter consisted of Canons Regular of St. Augustine.

The second bishop of Viborg, Svend I, was drowned by the Count of Stade in the Elbe river. His successor, Bishop Eskild, was similarly executed during Matins in the Church of St. Margaret, following an order from King Eric II.

Bishop Niels I founded the hospital of St. Michael, Viborg, in 1159, and the Cistercian nunnery of Asmild in 1169. During his term, the diocese's original Romanesque cathedral was completed, of which only the crypt remains. He is largely responsible for the beatification of Saint Kjeld and the translation of his body to a shrine at his chapel on 11 July 1189.

Bishop Gunner was born in 1152 and attended the University of Paris, where he took an interest in law. In 1208, he took up residence at Øm Abbey where, in 1216, he later became abbot. Gunner became bishop of Viborg in 1222. It is believed that he is responsible for writing out the Law of Jutland and composing the original preface to it; he was present when it was published at Vordingborg in 1241. He died at Asmild Abbey on 25 August 1251, and was buried in front of the shrine of St. Kjeld.

Leif Thor Olafsson was bishop of the diocese from 1438 until 1450, when he was installed as the bishop of the Diocese of Bergen. His position in Viborg was succeeded by Canute Mikkelsen, who had been the dean of the Church of Our Lady in Copenhagen and rector of the University of Erfurt. He authored Latin amendments to a treatise on the plague and the Law of Jutland.

Bishop Jørgen Friis was the last Catholic bishop of the diocese. During his tenure, the lutheran preachings of Hans Tausen gained popularity in Viborg and threatened the bishop's authority. By 1530, Viborg Cathedral had been claimed by protestants and was lost to the Catholic diocese. Friis left his position in Viborg for Hald Castle, where he was later imprisoned in 1536. Two years later, he was released on the condition that he conform to the newly established Church of Denmark's doctrine.

== Bishops ==
- Heribert, ca. 1065–1095
  - Vacant (ca. 1095–1106)
- Svend I, 1106–1112
- Eskil, 1112–1133
- Svend II, 1133–1153
- Niels I, 1153–1191
  - Vacant (1191–1222)
- Gunner, 1222–1251
  - Vacant (1251–1367)
- Jakob Moltke, 1367–1396
- Lave Glob, ??–1427
  - Vacant (1427–1438)
- Leif Thor Olafsson (Thorleiv Olavsson), 1438–1450
- Canute Mikkelsen, 1451–1478
- Niels Glob, 1478–1498
- Niels Friis, 1498–1508
- Erik Kaas, 1509–1520
- Jørgen Friis (bishop), 1521–1536

== See also ==
- Diocese of Viborg
- St. Peter's Priory, Grinderslev
