= Elise Eskilsdotter =

Norwegian noble

Elise Eskilsdotter (Elise Eskildsdatter) (died c. 1483) was a Norwegian noble. Elise was the daughter of Eskild Ågesen and Elisabeth Jakobsdatter Hegle. Her father was a knight from Scania. Around 1420, she married the Norwegian nobleman Olav Nilsson (ca. 1400–1455) who was a member of the noble Skanke family.

Olav Nilsson served as a member of the Riksråd of Norway and was knighted by King Erik of Pomerania in 1430 and became feudal overlord of Ryfylke in Rogaland, Norway. He was a wealthy landowner with properties in both Norway and Denmark. Olav later served King Christian I of Denmark as a privateer during the Dano-Hanseatic War (1426–35). After Treaty of Vordingborg in July 1435, King Christian made peace with the Hanseatic League. However Olav continued to attack German merchant ships against the wishes of the king. As a consequence, in 1453 the king dismissed Olav. In 1455, Olav Nilsson was assassinated at Munkeliv Abbey together with his son Nils, his brother Peder Nilsson Skanke, as well as Leif Thor Olafsson, Bishop of Bergen.

Following his death, Elise Eskilsdotter and her children led open warfare against the trade of the German merchant class of Bergen. Her eldest son, Olav, was killed by a shipwreck in 1465, but the youngest son Axel continued the business. Like many other members of the Norwegian nobility, she also opposed Danish rule over Norway. In 1468, King Christian I confiscated her fief because he no longer trusted her loyalty.

Elise died around 1483.

== Other sources ==
- Carlquist, Gunnar (1937) Svensk uppslagsbok. Bd 20 (Malmö: Svensk Uppslagsbok AB)

== Related reading ==
- Øye, Ingvild (1994) Bergen and the German Hansa (Bergen: Bryggens Museum) ISBN 9788290289527
- Nicolle, David (2014) Forces of the Hanseatic League: 13th - 15th Centuries (Osprey Publishing) ISBN 9781782007791
- Hetland, Ingebrigt (2008) Pirater og sjørøvere i norske farvann (Pantagruel Forlag AS) ISBN 9788279003236
- Stanton, Charles D. (2015) Medieval Maritime Warfare (Pen and Sword Books) ISBN 9781473856431
