= St. Peter's Priory, Grinderslev =

Coordinates: 56.6950°N 9.0687°E

St. Peter's Priory was an early Augustinian monastery located between the towns of Grinderslev and Breum, in north central Denmark.

== History ==
=== The Augustinians ===
St. Peter's Priory was established about 1150 during the tenure of the Bishop of Viborg, Bishop Svend I (1106–1112), or Bishop Eskild (1112–33), his brother and successor. Bishop Svend was a strong supporter of King Valdemar I. The first recorded reference is in 1176 when the Bishop of Viborg, Niels I (1153–91), established a 'brotherhood agreement between St. Peter's and the chapter at Viborg Cathedral. St. Peter's Priory was important at the time as three 'provincials' were held at St. Peter's for all Augustinian houses in Denmark.

The location of St. Peter's was in earliest times called Salling which consisted of 'herreds' including several villages. In medieval times Salling was a political subdivision of northern Jutland called Sallingsyssel. In time the villages of Grinderslev and Breum grew on each side of St. Peter's Abbey.

St. Peter's church was built of granite blocks in the Romanesque style with rounded arches and a flat beam ceiling. An apse was built onto the choir of the church. Of particular interest is the 'priest's door' built into the side of the church with medieval carved stones on each side. Several other such carved stone can be found in the exterior of the apse. The church was towerless. The entire church is remarkably preserved. Unlike most other monastery churches, it was never rebuilt in brick; the original granite church remains with its carved granite stones. Many other early monastery churches were built in the same way and then later replaced by larger brick churches.

Augustinian canons always had a bishop at the head of their monasteries, except at St. Peter's. It is the only surviving Augustinian priory in Denmark. Bishop Niels' 'brotherhood agreement' with the chapter at St. Mary's Abbey at Viborg Cathedral is perhaps how the leadership of a bishop was implemented. The canons at St. Peter's promised to be obedient to the chapter at St. Mary's which was headed by the Bishop of Viborg. The agreement meant that the canons moved between the two houses and that the larger house at Viborg would 'protect' the smaller establishment at Salling. Augustinians were a scholarly order and operated a school, most likely for the sons of noble families in the region. In the 1440s the Augustinian Abbey at Viborg was closed and St. Peter's came under the direct control of the Bishop Thorleif Olafssön (1438–50).

St. Peter's was a small, isolated house with a thatched roof and 'very poor' according to one of the first Lutheran parish priests at Grinderslev Church. By the 15th century the church was expanded and a second aisle added in the Gothic style. Shortly after 1500 the church interior was remodelled with Gothic arches. About the same time a tower was added to the west end of the nave, but construction was poorly done, and it would have to be rebuilt in brick about a hundred years later. Even though the priory was small it owned most of the land at Salling. The farms paid rent to support the monks at the priory. Simon Nielsen was named as Prior at St. Peter's Priory in 1513.

By 1531 the Augustinians had abandoned St. Peter's. Viborg was a hotbed of Lutheran agitation against Catholic beliefs, customs, and institutions. Support for religious houses evaporated within months of the collapse of the religious centers at Viborg. The priory was secularized and given by the last Catholic Bishop of Viborg, Jörgen Friis (1521–36), to the governor (Danish: lensmand) of Skivehus Castle.

=== Kingdom of Denmark ===
In 1536 the Kingdom of Denmark became officially a Lutheran state under Christian III, an ardent Lutheran. All religious houses and their income producing properties reverted to the crown for disposal. The extensive priory archive was catalogued by the crown administrator, but subsequently lost. Only a single letter regarding St. Peter's has been preserved from 1401. In 1542 the estate was mortgaged, and then sold off in 1581 to Christoffer Lykke, a nobleman for 29 established farms, two small holdings, and two mills. The priory buildings were converted to a manor house, called Grinderslev Priory (Danish: Grinderslev Kloster), but by 1700 all of the priory was razed and the materials used to build Grinderslev Priory manor house.

=== Parish church ===
The church became the parish church for Grinderslev. The priory structures were torn down and a late Gothic brick tower, a side aisle to the nave, sacristy, and a weapons house entry were added before 1600 using materials left over from the demolition of the priory.

In 1722 the Bishop Søren Lintrop visited Grinderslev and found the priest negligent and the church and former priory buildings in serious disrepair. He ordered them to be repaired, but offered no help with the cost.

=== Priory site ===
A new manor house called Grinderslev Koster was built on the site of the priory in 1887 which can still be seen today, though it is privately owned.

Recent restoration have brought the priory church into the condition which it once had as a priory church.

== See also ==
- Ancient Diocese of Viborg
- Diocese of Viborg

== Sources ==
- Grinderslev Kirke (in Danish)
- 'Grinderslev Kirke'.
