= Brædstrup =

- town
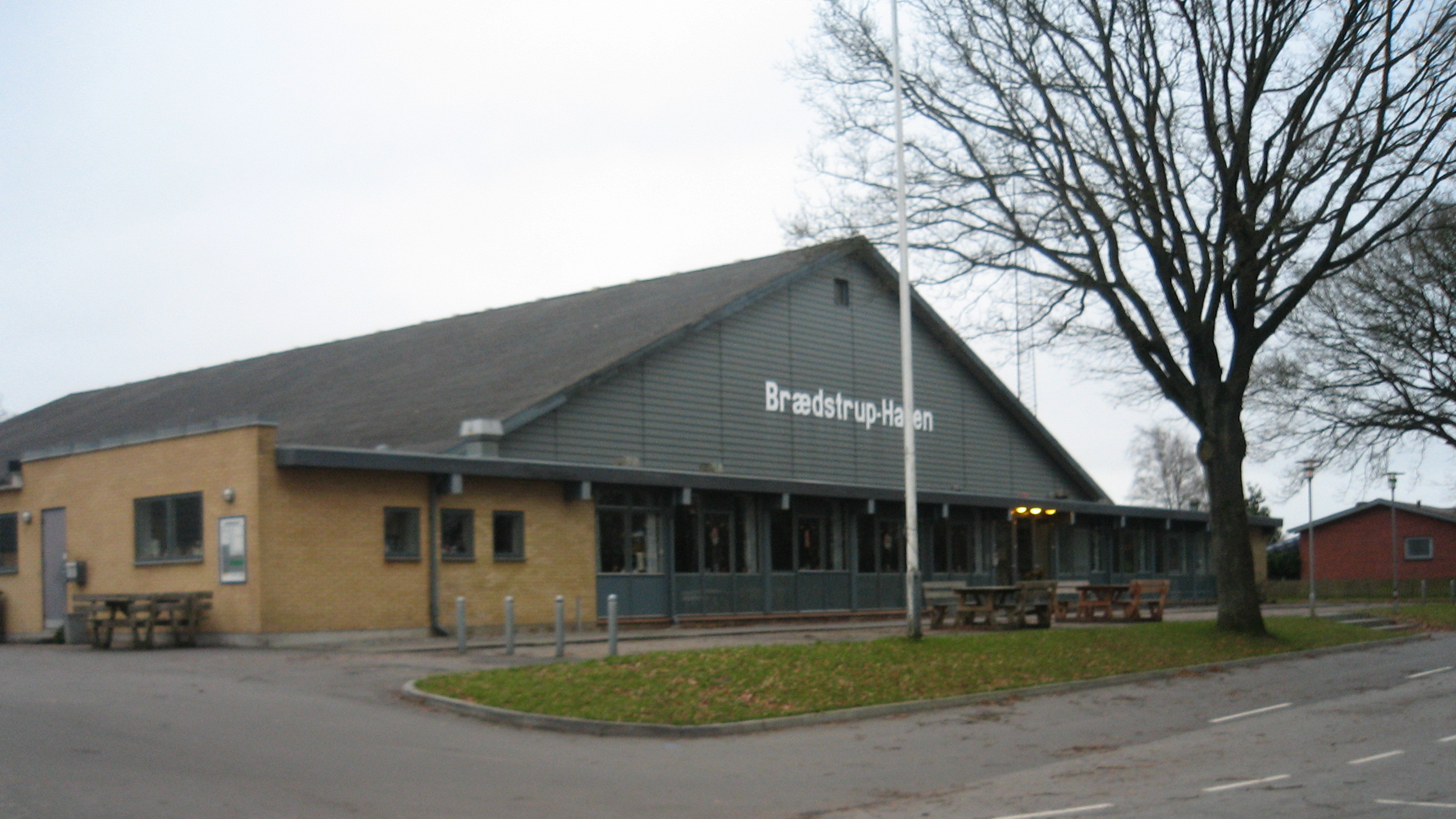

- Location in Denmark Brædstrup (Central Denmark Region)
- Coordinates: 55.97153°N 9.61128°E
- Country: Denmark
- Region: Central Denmark (Midtjylland)
- Municipality: Horsens

Area
  - Urban: 2.84 km^{2} (1.10 sq mi)

Population (2026)
  - Urban: 3,917
  - Urban density: 1,380/km^{2} (3,570/sq mi)
  - Gender: 1,863 males and 2,054 females
- Time zone: UTC+1 (CET)
  - Summer (DST): UTC+2 (CEST)
- Postal code: DK-8740 Brædstrup

Brædstrup is a former railway town in Jutland, Denmark at the railway between Horsens and Silkeborg which was closed in 1968. Until 1 January 2007 it was the municipal seat of the former Brædstrup Municipality and today, with a population of 3,917 (1 January 2026), it is the second largest town of Horsens Municipality, Central Denmark Region in Denmark. The town is situated 20 km (12 mi) northwest of Horsens.

== Notable people ==
- Henrik Stubkjær (born 1961 in Brædstrup) a Danish theologian and Bishop of Viborg
- Kristian Thulesen Dahl (born 1969 in Brædstrup) a Danish politician, leader of the Danish People's Party since 2012, member of the Folketing since 1994.
- Allan Søgaard (born 1978 in Brædstrup) a Danish former football player, 304 caps with AC Horsens
- Mette Abildgaard (born 1988 in Føvling at Brædstrup) a Danish politician, member of the Folketing

== Photo Gallery ==
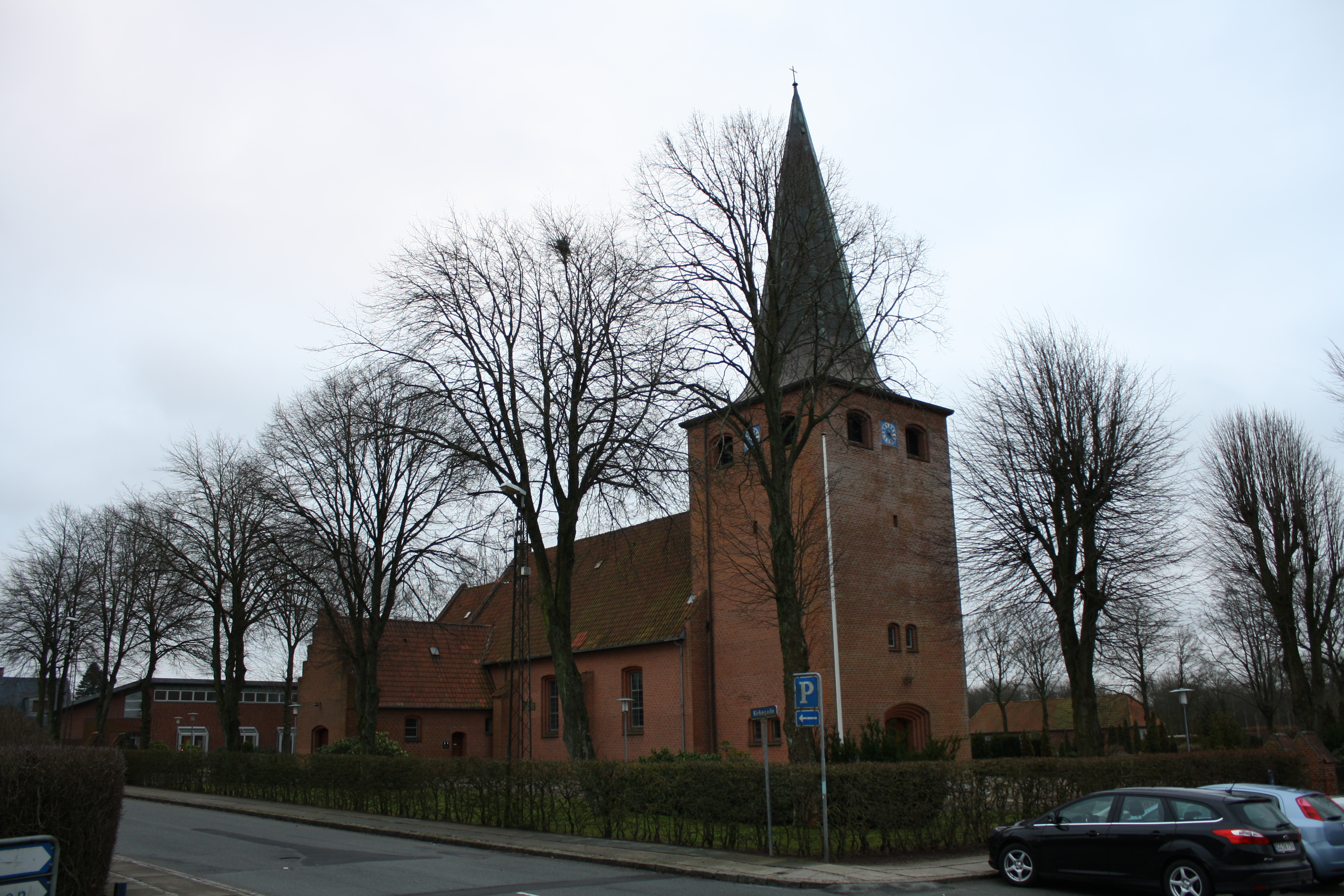
Brædstrup Church; Built in 1941.

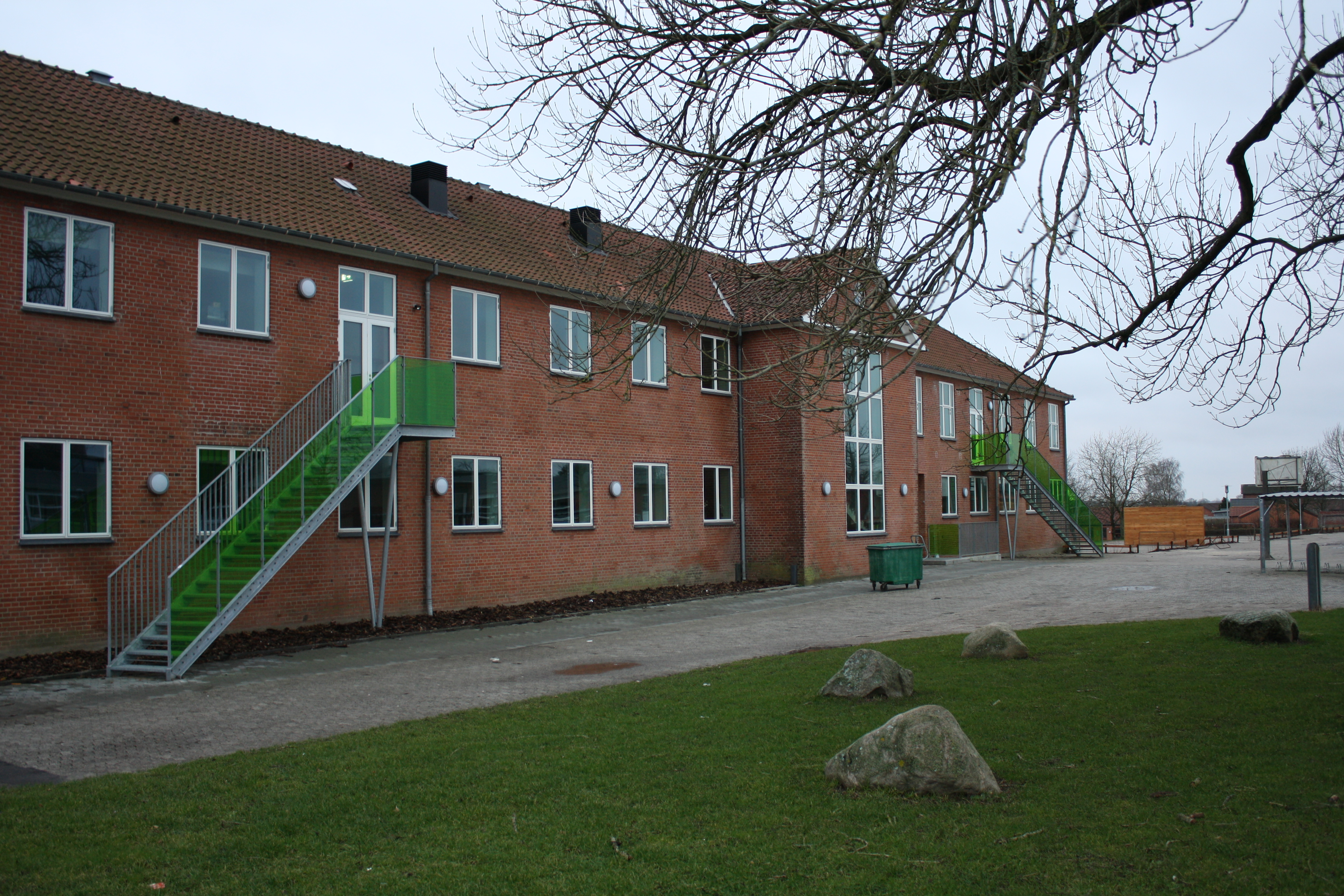
Brædstrup Municipal School; Established c. 1890. Occupied by German troops during World War II.

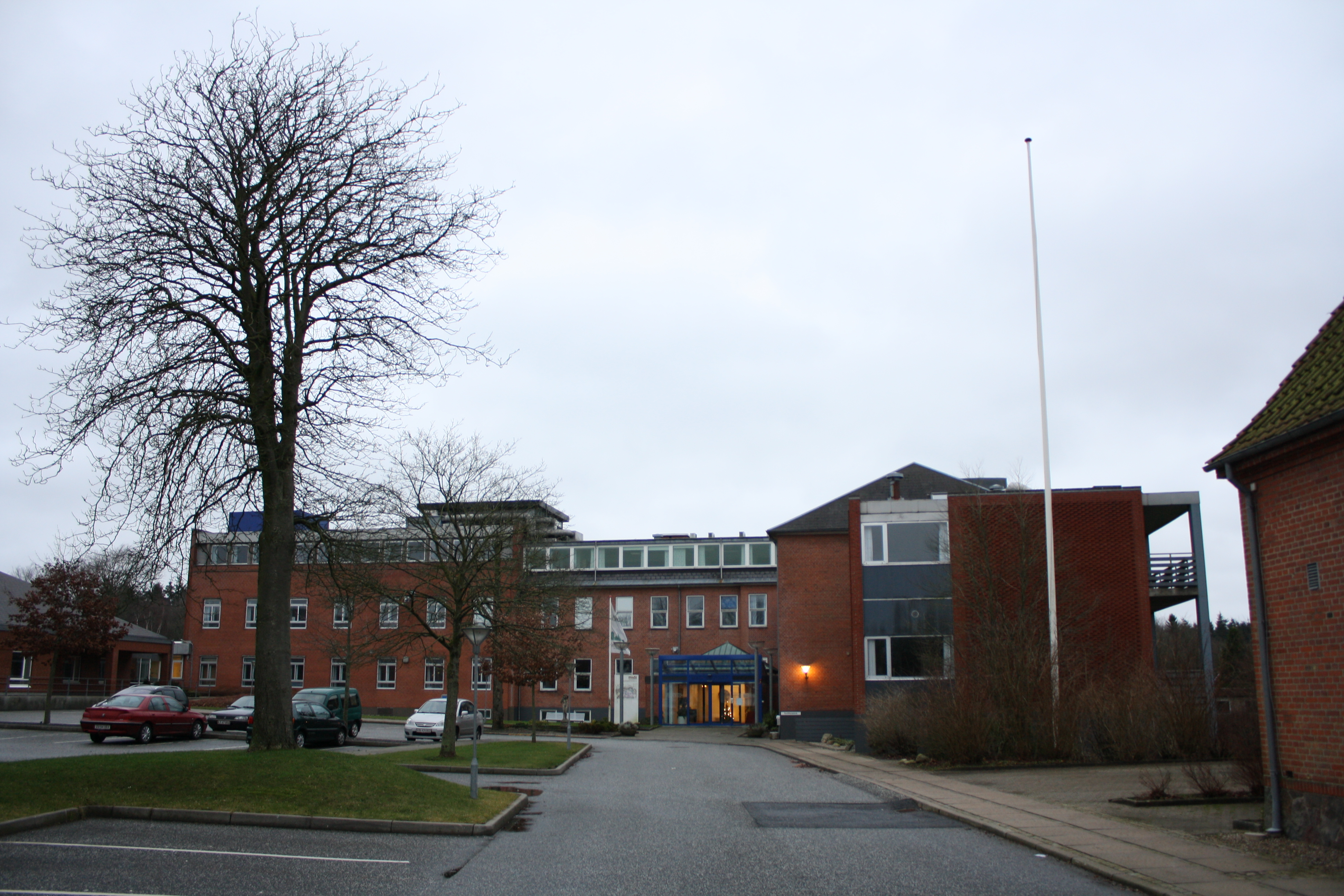
Brædstrup Hospital; Built 1892-93 and expanded several times. Demolished 2014.

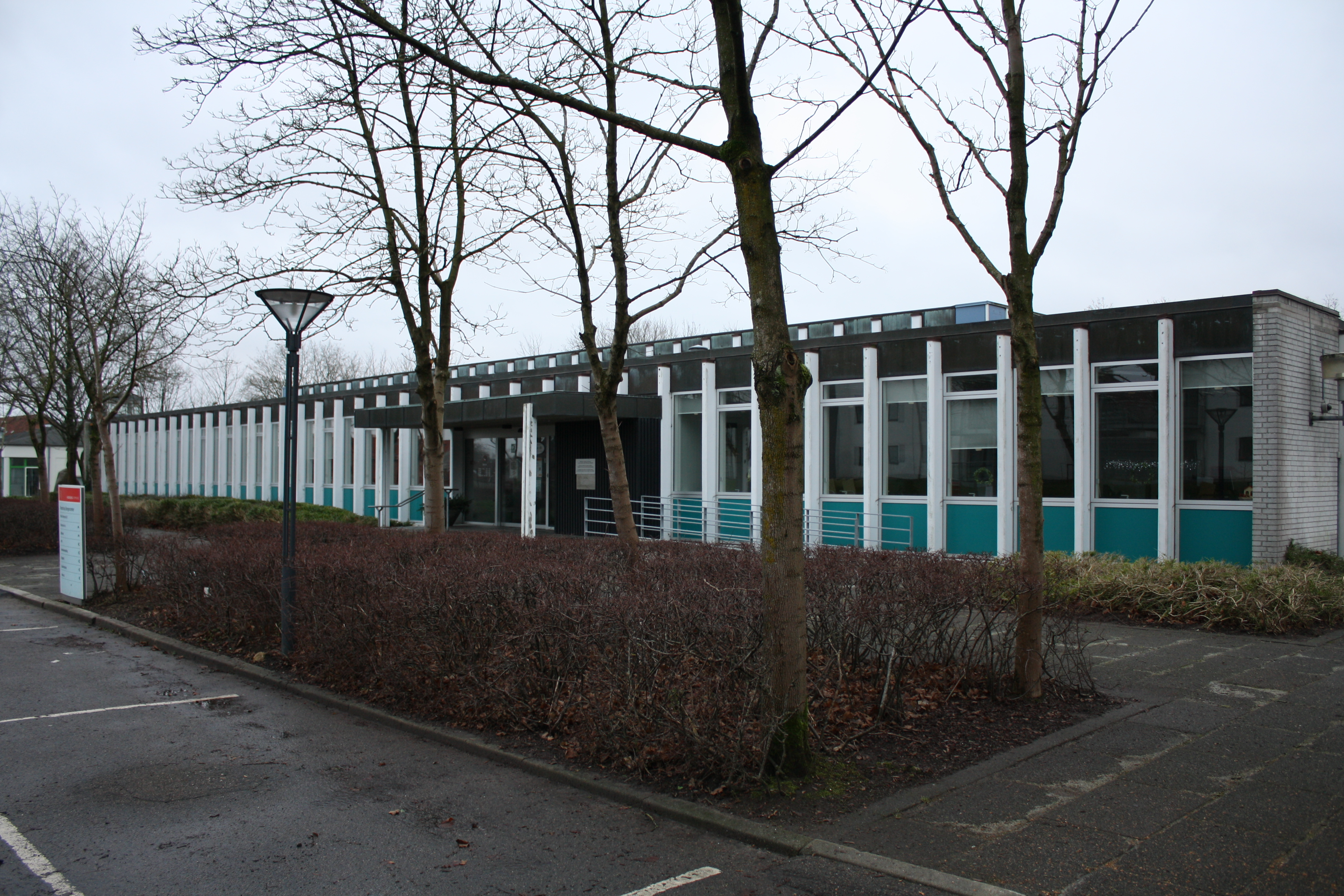
Brædstrup Old Town Hall; Built c. 1970. Today used as municipal building and library.

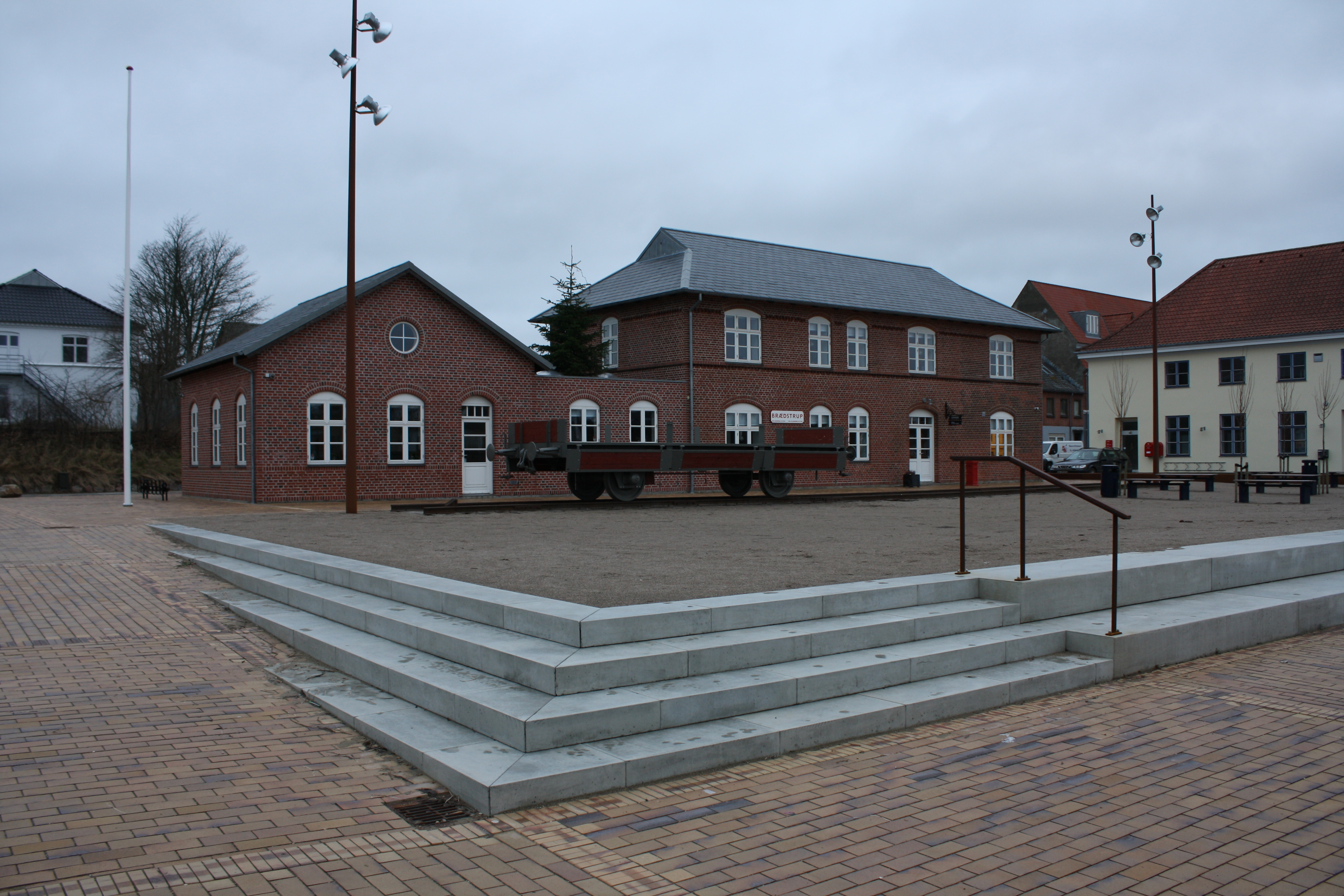
Brædstrup Station; Active 1899–1968. Today occupied by a private company.

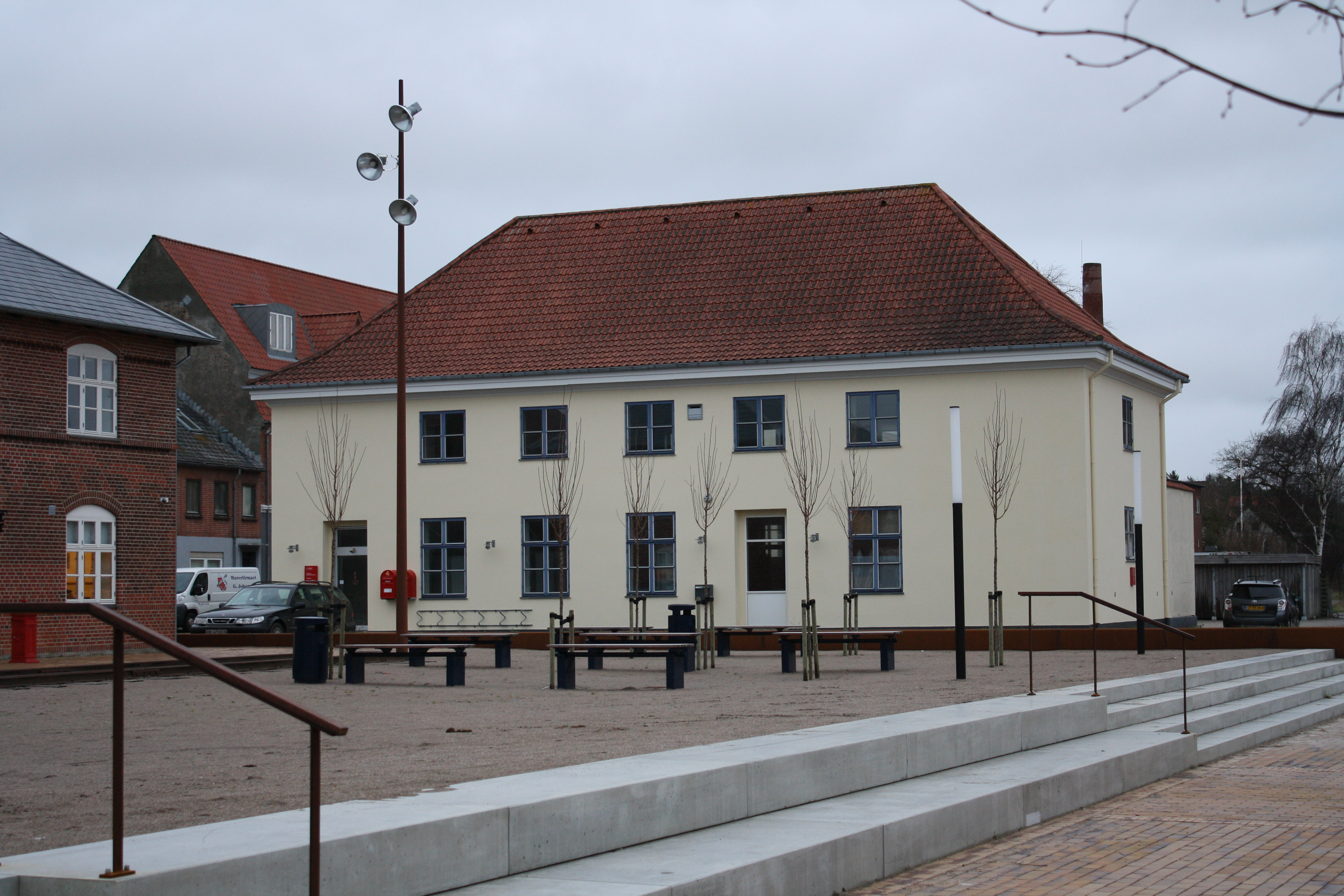
Brædstrup Post Office; Postal service established 1875. Current building erected in 1921. Now housing a restaurant.

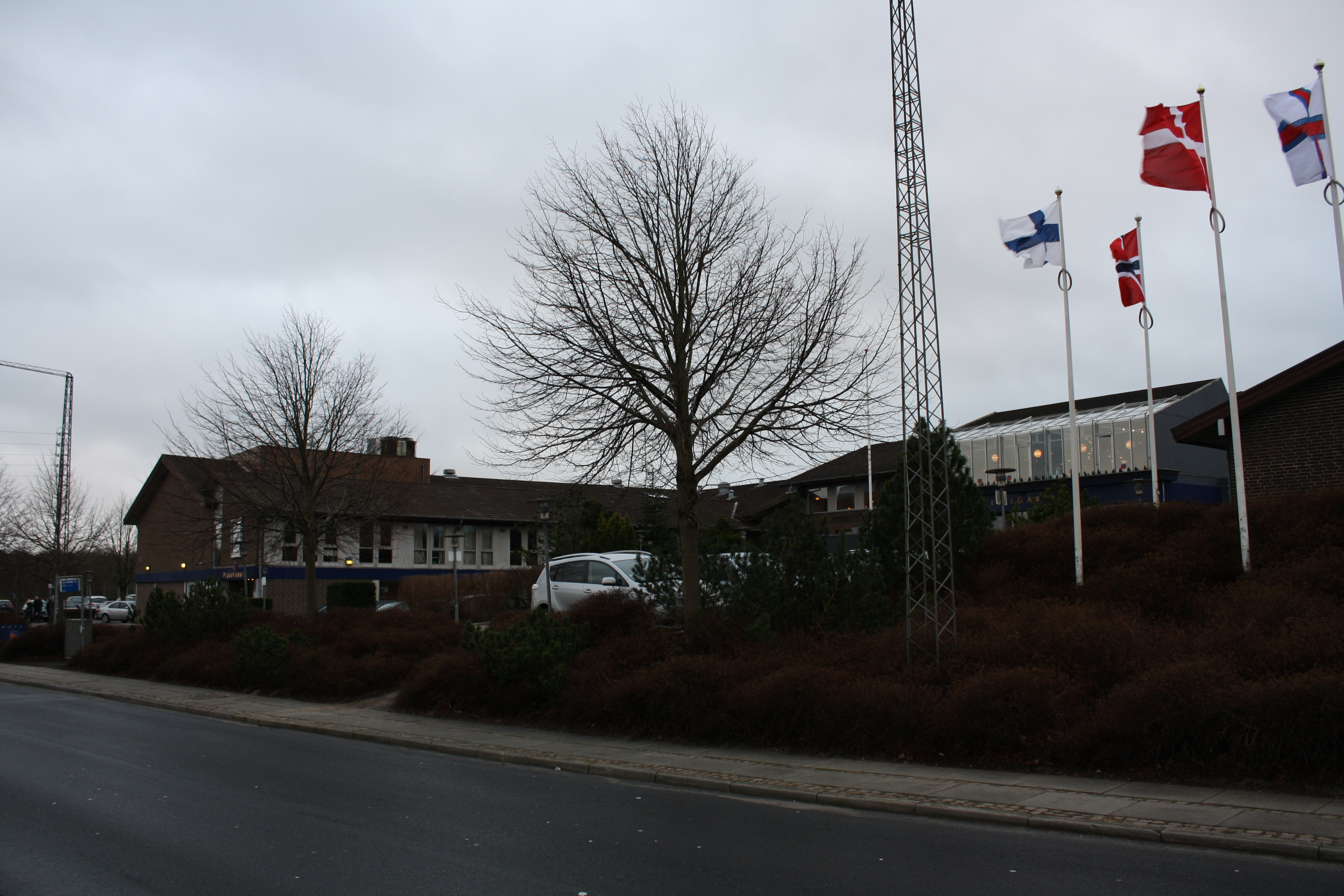
Hotel Pejsegården; Built 1969-1971 and expanded multiple times.

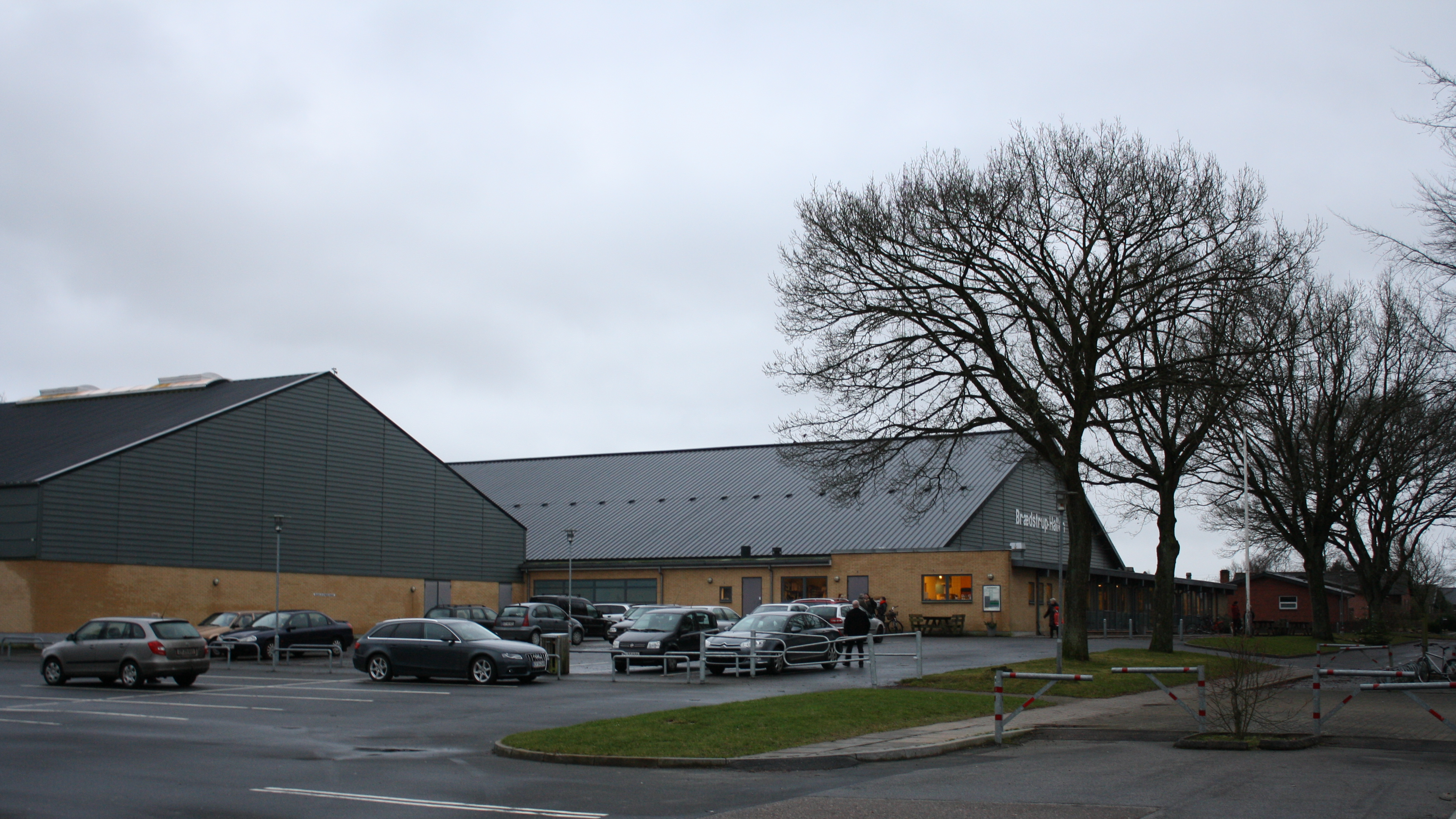
Brædstrup Gymnasium; Used primarily for team handball.

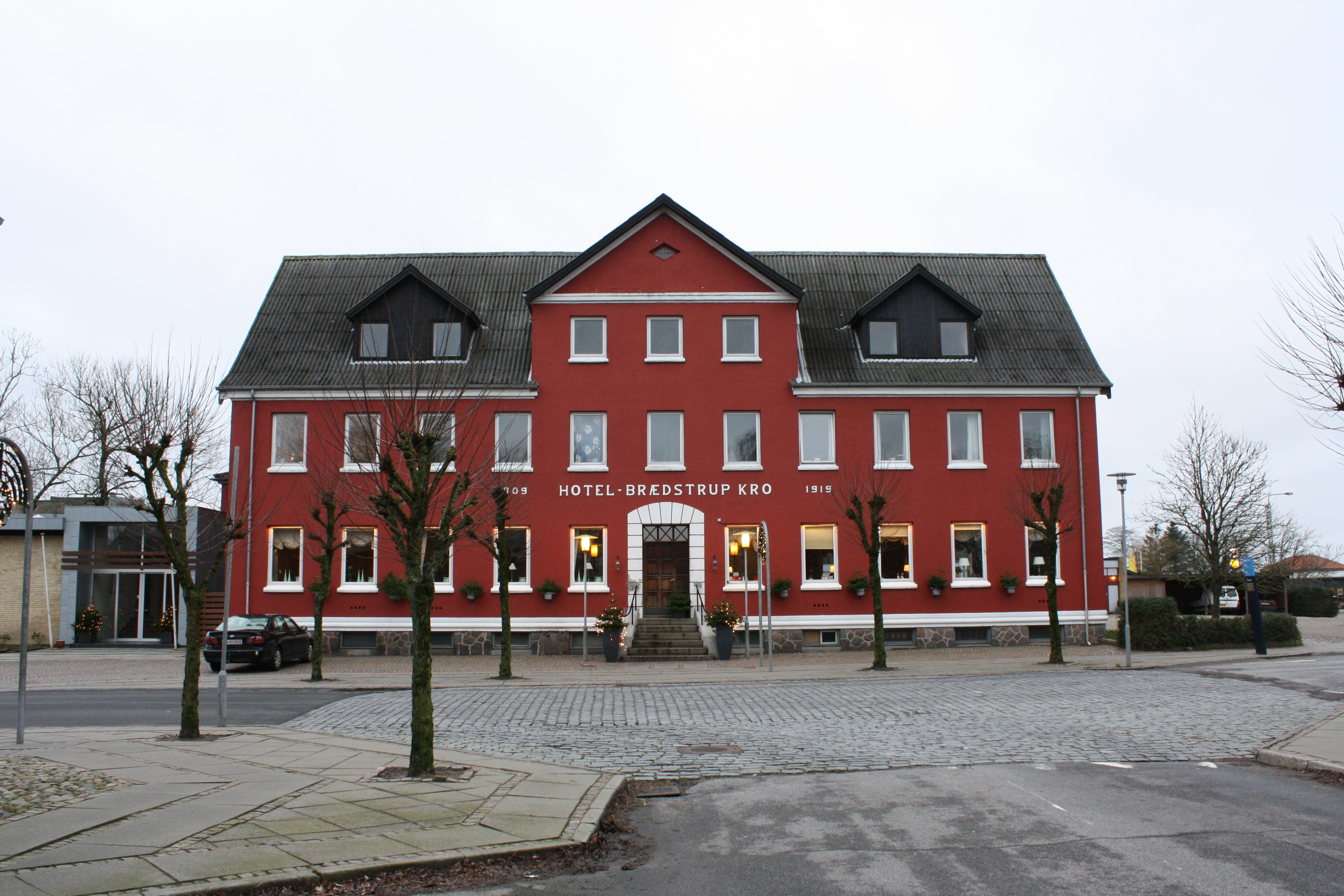
Brædstrup Kro; Inn established late 18th century. Demolished 2019.
