= Skancke =

Skancke is a Norwegian family name with some slightly different spellings as Skanke, Schanke, Schanche and others. It is not proved whether all persons with those names descend from the same family line in the Middle Ages.

Isle of Man flag

One of the Skancke coats of arms with peacock feathers as crest

Some alleged medieval ancestors of the Skancke families, had coats of arms with one armoured leg in the shield and one armoured leg in the crest. From that fact, some persons have made a theory that the two legs mean a link to the three legs in the arms of the monarchical dynasty of the Isle of Man. Norwegian genealogists and heraldists of today, however, provide little further support to such a theory, and there are many coats of arms with armoured legs that exist in other countries. The name Skanke might mean a leg and the arms thus being canting arms. There are several variants of the arms through the ages: the shield divided, a rose at the knee of the leg, the crest with an armoured arm holding a sword, and the crest with peacock feathers.

== See also ==
- Skanke (noble family)
- Skanke (surname), lists all spelling variants
