= Giovanni Castiglione =

Giovanni Castiglione may refer to:

- Giovanni Castiglione (cardinal) (1420–1460), Italian bishop and cardinal
- Giovanni Castiglione (bishop) (died 1456), Italian bishop
- Giovanni Battista Castiglione (1516–1598), Italian tutor to Princess (later Queen) Elizabeth I
- Giovanni Benedetto Castiglione (1609–1664), Italian painter and printmaker
- Giovanni Castiglione (Cardinal, 1742) (1742–1815), Italian bishop and cardinal
