= Allan Søgaard =

Danish footballer (born 1978)

Personal information
- Date of birth: 20 January 1978 (age 48)
- Place of birth: Brædstrup, Denmark
- Height: 1.77 m (5 ft 10 in)
- Position: Midfielder

Youth career
- 1984–1994: Brædstrup IF
- 1994–1995: Middelfart GB

Senior career*
| Years | Team | Apps | (Gls) |
| 1995–2010 | AC Horsens | 304 | (?) |
- * Club domestic league appearances and goals

Allan Søgaard (born 20 January 1978) is a Danish former football player, spent his entire career playing for the Danish Superliga side AC Horsens. His normal position was as a defensive midfielder. He was known as a pacy player, with a major dedication to his team.

Søgaard played a huge part in AC Horsens' promotion to the Superliga in 2005, and kept up his importance for the team during the first Superliga season. However, due to injury, he was out of the team during entire 2007.

== Honours ==
- Danish 1st Division:
  - Runner-up: 2004-05 (with Horsens)
