= Giovanni Castiglione (bishop) =

Roman Catholic prelate

Monsignore Giovanni Castiglione
- Bishop of Orvieto
- Church: Catholic Church
- Diocese: Diocese of Orvieto
- In office: 1454–1456
- Previous post: Bishop of Penne e Atri (1433–1454)

Personal details
- Died: 1 September 1456 Orvieto, Italy

Giovanni Castiglione de Polena (died 1 Sep 1456) was a Roman Catholic prelate who served as Bishop of Orvieto (1454–1456) and Bishop of Penne e Atri (1433–1454).

== Biography ==
On 23 Mar 1433, Giovanni Castiglione was appointed by Pope Eugene IV as Bishop of Penne e Atri.

While bishop, he was the principal co-consecrator of Canute Mikkelsen, Bishop of Viborg (1452).

On 21 Oct 1454, he was appointed Bishop of Orvieto by Pope Nicholas V. He served as Bishop of Orvieto until his death on 1 Sep 1456.

== External links and additional sources ==
- Cheney, David M. "Archdiocese of Pescara-Penne". Catholic-Hierarchy.org. (Chronology of Bishops) ^{[self-published]}
- Chow, Gabriel. "Metropolitan Archdiocese of Pescara-Penne". GCatholic.org. (Chronology of Bishops) ^{[self-published]}

Catholic Church titles
Preceded by	Bishop of Penne e Atri; 1433–1454	Succeeded by
Preceded by	Bishop of Orvieto; 1454–1456	Succeeded by Marco Marinoni
