= Erik Kaas =

Most Reverend Erik Kaas
- Bishop of Viborg
- Church: Catholic Church
- Diocese: Diocese of Viborg
- In office: 1509–1520
- Predecessor: Niels Friis
- Successor: Jørgen Friis (bishop)

Personal details
- Died: 20 September 1520 Viborg, Denmark

Erik Kaas (died 20 Sep 1520) was a Roman Catholic prelate who served as Bishop of Viborg (1509–1520).

== Biography ==
On 31 Jan 1509, Erik Kaas was appointed during the papacy of Pope Julius II as Bishop of Viborg. He served as Bishop of Viborg until his death on 20 Sep 1520.

== See also ==
- Catholic Church in Germany

Catholic Church titles
Preceded by Niels Friis	Bishop of Viborg; 1509–1520	Succeeded by Jørgen Friis (bishop)
