= Jens Bigum =

Danish agrarian and business manager (born 1938)

- Born: 28 July 1938 (age 87); Gislum, Vesthimmerland Municipality, Denmark
- Known for: Has been CEO of Arla Foods.

Jens Jørgen Bigum (born 28 July 1938) is a Danish business executive and former CEO of Arla Foods.

Bigum is a graduate of the Royal Veterinary and Agricultural University in 1965 and earned his "Handelshøjskolernes erhvervsøkonomiske diplomuddannelsein" (roughly translated as "Business Economics Diploma") in organization in 1970.

After graduating, he was appointed as a deputy head of Oxexport Executive in Axelborg, In 1970 he joined the dairy company MD Foods as an organization manager. In 1972 he became CFO and in 1987 he became a member of the Group Management. He became Deputy Director in 1989 and Managing Director in 1992. Under his leadership, the company merged twice - first in 1998 with Kløver Mælk, then in 2000 with the Swedish Arla company. After the merge with Swedish Arla, he became the first CEO of the new company, Arla Foods. He retired in 2004. He has also been Vice President of Carlsberg.

Bigum is on the board of several organizations, including as Chairman of the Board of Aarhus University, for Scan Energy and as a member of the Board of Directors of BBH (a subsidiary of Carlsberg Breweries).
