= Henrik Stubkjær =

Danish theologian

The Right Reverend Henrik Stubkjær
- Bishop of Viborg
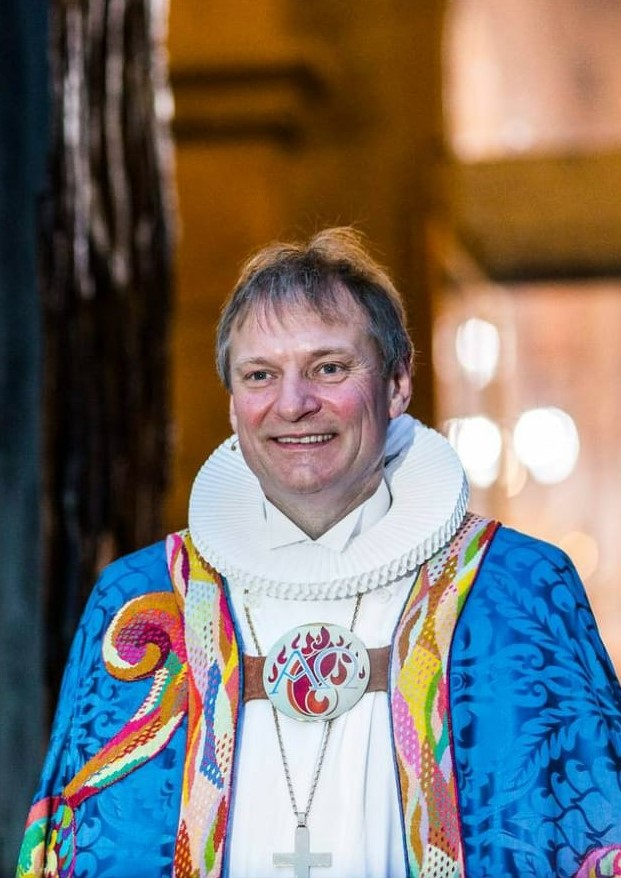
- Stubkjær in 2018
- Church: Church of Denmark
- Diocese: Viborg
- Elected: 2014
- Predecessor: Karsten Nissen

Orders
- Ordination: 1990
- Consecration: 23 November 2014

Personal details
- Born: 31 December 1961 (age 64) Brædstrup, Denmark
- Denomination: Lutheran
- Spouse: Karen Stubkjær
- Children: 4
- Education: Aarhus University

Henrik Stubkjær (born 31 of December 1961) is a Danish Lutheran theologian, from November 2014 the 44th Bishop of Viborg in the Evangelical Lutheran Church in Denmark and president of the Lutheran World Federation (LWF).

Stubkjær is chair of World Service, a member of the presidium of UNICEF Denmark and chair of Møltrup Optagelseshjem, a home for homeless men of all ages who wish to leave alcohol and drugs behind them.

== Life ==
Stubkjær graduated in theology from Aarhus University in 1990. Between 1993 and 1996 he was vicar of Møllevang Church in Aarhus and a chaplain to the students at Aarhus University. From 1996 to 2005 he was the head of the Diaconal College in Aarhus (Diakonhøjskolen in Aarhus) – an educational centre for the diaconate. From 2005 to 2014 he served as Secretary General in DanChurchAid – a humanitarian NGO rooted in the Evangelical Lutheran Church in Denmark and also a member organization of the Act Alliance. He has been a board member of the ACT Alliance, and chair in ACT EU.

In 2014 he was elected bishop of Viborg. As a bishop he has been very engaged in missional, diaconal and ecumenical work. Through a diocesan committee, study trips to meet churches in other countries are arranged on a regular basis, and he emphasized building relations with Orthodox migrants of Eastern European background, Persian-speaking migrants, and asylum seekers. Every year an intercession service for persecuted Christians is held in the Cathedral in Viborg.

Furthermore, Stubkjær has placed great emphasis on theological education for lay people in the diocese, based on Luther's concept of the priesthood of all believers.

Henrik Stubkjær has been engaged in ecumenical work for many years. As a bishop he has developed strong relations with other churches, both in Denmark and abroad. For example, there are strong ties and mutual exchange and learning between the diocese of Viborg and the Lutheran Church of Christ in Nigeria as well as the Diocese of Guildford in the Church of England. Furthermore, Stubkjær served as chair of the National Council of Churches in Denmark for one term (2016–2019). Since 2017 he has served as a member of the Council of The Lutheran World Federation, as well as Chair of World Service. In the summer of 2020 he completed a Master of Public Governance (MPG) degree from Copenhagen Business School.

In August 2023 Stubkjær was nominated as a candidate for the position of president of the Lutheran World Federation and won the election.
