= Gislum =

Gislum Parish Gislum Sogn
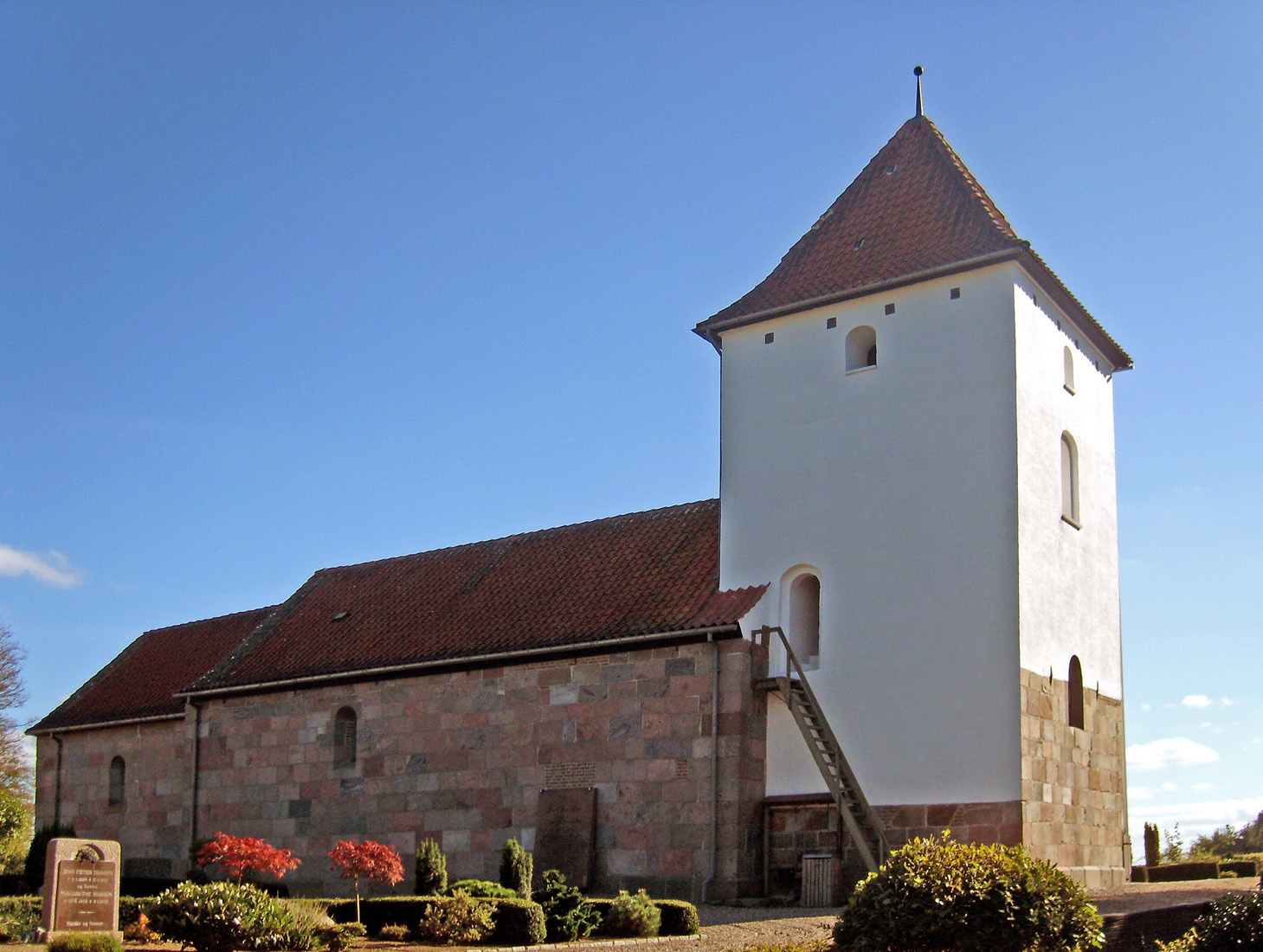
- Gislum Church

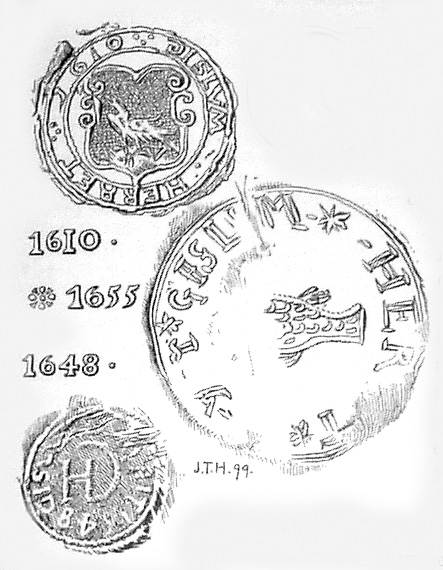
- Seal

- Location within Denmark
- Country: Denmark
- Region: Central Denmark (Midtjylland)
- Municipality: Vesthimmerland Municipality
- Diocese: Diocese of Viborg

Population (2023)
  - Total: 329
- Time zone: UTC+1 (Central Europe Time)
  - Summer (DST): UTC+2
- Postal code: 9600

Gislum Parish (Danish: Gislum Sogn) is a parish located in Vesthimmerland Municipality within the Diocese of Viborg.

Until the 1970 Danish Municipal Reform, the parish was a municipal region within Gislum Herred in Aalborg County The town within the parish once had a grocery store and two schools, all of which closed had closed by 1980.

In 1432 there was something called Gislum call and it was because the prist of Gislum was in control over Vognsild, Svingelbjerg and Farsø parish.

== Notable people ==
- Jens Bigum (born 1938 in Gislum) a Danish business executive and former CEO of Arla Foods
