= Niels Glob =

Roman Catholic prelate

Most Reverend Niels Glob
- Bishop of Viborg
- Church: Catholic Church
- Diocese: Diocese of Viborg
- In office: 1478–1488
- Predecessor: Canute Mikkelsen
- Successor: Niels Friis

Personal details
- Died: 1498 Viborg, Denmark

Niels Glob was a Roman Catholic prelate who served as Bishop of Viborg (1478–1488).

== Biography ==
On 20 November 1478, Niels Glob was appointed during the papacy of Pope Sixtus IV as Bishop of Viborg. He served as Bishop of Viborg until his death in 1498.

Catholic Church titles
Preceded by Canute Mikkelsen	Bishop of Viborg; 1478–1498	Succeeded by Niels Friis
