= Skanke (surname) =

Skanke, in many spelling variants is a Norwegian family name with several spellings, used by several noble families with these names.

The official recent statastics of the following surnames can me checked in the surname databases of Norway: and Sweden: Schanche Schancke Schanke Skanche Skancke Skanke Skuncke Skunck

Notable people with the surname include:

== Schanke ==
- Guri Schanke (born 1961), Norwegian actress and singer
- Einar Schanke (1927–1990), Norwegian composer
- Kari Schanke (1922–2006), Norwegian politician
- Nina Schanke Funnemark, Norwegian civil servant

== Schanche, Schancke ==
- Gabriel Schanche Kielland
- Ingolf Schanche
- Jens Schanche
- Jonas Schanche Kielland
- Jonas Schanche Kielland (born 1863)
- Liss Schanche, Norwegian politician
- Martin Schanche (born 1945), Norwegian politician and racing driver

== Skanke, Skancke ==
- Olav Nilsson Skanke (died 1455), Norwegian nobleman, knight and privateer, member of the Riksråd
- Martin Skancke (born 1966), Norwegian sovereign wealth fund and asset manager expert
- Ragnar Skancke (1890–1948), Norwegian politician

== See also ==
- Skanke (noble family)
