= Canute Mikkelsen =

Danish Bishop of Viborg (1451–1478)

Most Reverend Canute Mikkelsen
- Bishop of Viborg
- Church: Catholic Church
- Diocese: Diocese of Viborg
- In office: 1451–1478
- Predecessor: Leif Thor Olafsson
- Successor: Niels Glob

Orders
- Consecration: 5 Mar 1452 by Radulphus

Canute Mikkelsen (or Canute Cobson) was a Catholic prelate who served as Bishop of Viborg (1451–1478).

== Biography ==
On 14 Apr 1451, Canute Mikkelsen was appointed during the papacy of Pope Nicholas V as Bishop of Viborg. On 5 Mar 1452, he was consecrated bishop by Radulphus, Bishop of Città di Castello, with Giovanni Castiglione, Bishop of Penne e Atri, and Marco Marinoni, Bishop of Alessandria, serving as co-consecrators. He served as Bishop of Viborg until his resignation in 1478.

Catholic Church titles
Preceded by Leif Thor Olafsson	Bishop of Viborg; 1451–1478	Succeeded by Niels Glob
