= Skanke (noble family) =

Norwegian surname and former noble family

- Nobility
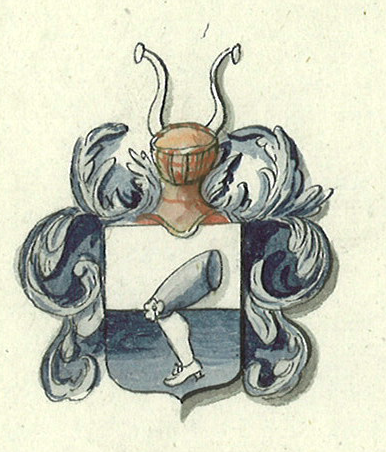
- Coat of arms of the Skanke family
- Country: Norway
- Place of origin: Jemtland; Isle of Man (claim)
- Founded: 1300s

The Skanke family is a former Norwegian noble family.

== Connection with the Isle of Man ==
According to the Skanke Family Association in Norway (Skanke-foreningen i Norge), the family can trace its roots to Jemtland in the 14th century with a high degree of certainty, and with less certainty to the Isle of Man before that. The association's shield depicts a blue-armored leg (or shank), spurred in gold, on a field of white.

The family's use of a leg motif in its heraldry has been compared with the Manx triskelion. Manx historian George Vaughan Chichester Young, O.B.E., supposed from that similarity that the family descends from the rulers of Manx (who lost their kingdom as a result of the Treaty of Perth and the 1275 loss of the Battle of Ronaldsway). He wrote in his work A Brief History of the Isle of Man:

The rebellion {of 1275} was, however, abortive and resulted in some members of the royal family emigrating to Norway, where their descendants are still to be found in the Norwegian family of Skankes, the Swedish family of Skunck(e)s and the Danish family of Barfods. The emigrants took with them as their Arms "the three legs", which had been the Royal Arms of the Sudreyan Kings since about the middle of the 13th century. These Arms (a modification of the ancient Indo-Germanic sun symbol) were simplified in Norway and Sweden to one leg and in Denmark to three bare feet, and later to one bare foot

— Young, G.V.C.: A Brief History of the Isle of Man, The Mansk-Svenska Publishing Co. Ltd., Peel, Isle of Man, 2001: p. 12

== Skankes opposing each other ==
The Kalmar Union was an unstable creation, often shook by struggles between the pro-Danish and pro-Swedish factions. These conditions would lead the family into battle, with relatives ending up on opposing sides in a war of succession.

In 1452, knight Örjan Karlson Skanke from Jemtland is mentioned as agent of Charles VIII of Sweden. Ørjan was sent to conquer Trondheim, the ancient centre of Norway's kings. Control of this vital city would have greatly strengthened Charles' claim to the throne. The answer from the Danish side came with knight Ørjan's own distant relatives. Olav Nilsson (ca. 1400–1455) was commander of Bergenhus Fortress in Bergen. Olav Nilsson and his brother Peder, marching up from the south and pushing Ørjan out of Trondheim. The same thing happened all over again in 1453 with Ørjan seizing Trondheim and Olav and Peder driving him out once more. This second battle finally concluded the conflict over succession and ended the battles between knights of the Skanke family.

The pro-Danish side, led by the knight Olav Nilsson and his brother and fellow knight, Peder Nilsson, came out on top in this struggle. The two brothers belonged to Norwegian pro-Danish forces which repeatedly defeated the Swedish forces of Charles VIII in the area around Trondheim. After their participation in the fighting the brothers received high ranking positions in the administration of Norway.

== See also ==
- Skancke
- Skanke (surname), lists all spelling variants

== Other sources ==
- de Robelin, Roger (1995) Skanke ätten, ISBN 82-993791-0-5
- Engdal, Odd G. (2006) Norsk marinehistorisk atlas 900–2005 (Bergen: Vigmostad & Bjørk) ISBN 82-419-0454-1
- Hetland, Ingebrigt (2008) Pirater og sjørøvere i norske farvann (Oslo: Pantagruel Forlag) ISBN 978-82-7900-323-6
- Øye, Ingvild (1994) Bergen and the German Hansa (Bergen: Bryggens Museum) ISBN 82-90289-52-9
- Young, G.V.C. (1997) A Brief History of the Isle of Man (Mansk-Svenska Publishing Co Ltd) ISBN 978-0907715412
- Young, G.V.C. (1981) History of the Isle of Man Under the Norse: Or, Now Through a Glass Darkly (Mansk-Svenska Publishing Co Ltd) ISBN 978-0907715030
- Young, G.V.C. (1981) The three legs go to Scandinavia a monograph on the Manx royal family and their Scandinavian descendants (Mansk-Svenska Pub. Co. Ltd)
