= Saint Kjeld =

Catholic Saint, Provost

Kjeld
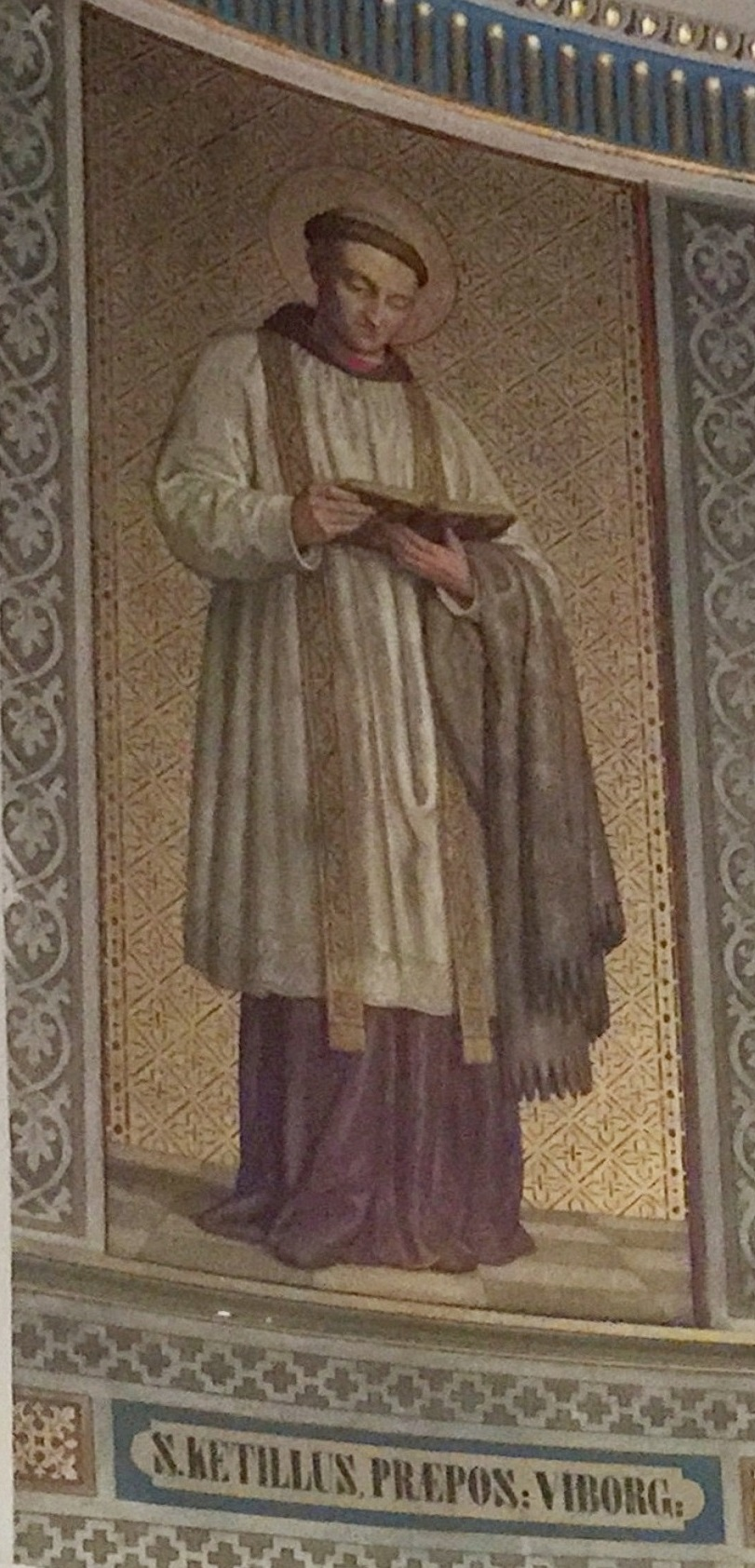
- Image of St. Kjeld from St. Ansgar's Catholic Cathedral in Copenhagen
- Born: c. 1100; Denmark
- Died: c. 1150; Viborg, Denmark
- Venerated in: Catholic Church, Church of Denmark
- Patronage: Denmark

Kjeld or Ketil (Latin: Chetillus, Ketillus, Danish: Keld, Kjeld, Ketil; fl. 1100–1150) was a 12th-century Danish clergyman. He is venerated as a saint in Denmark, by both Catholics and Danish Lutherans.

== Life ==
Kjeld was born in the early 12th century to wealthy parents, who lived on a farm in the Randers area. It was soon decided that he should have a future in the church. He studied in Lübeck.

Bishop Eskil of Viborg ordained him and persuaded Kjeld to joined the Augustinian canons at the cathedral chapter. The canons of the cathedral chapter were in charge of the worship services at the cathedral, and assisted the bishop in his administrative work.

Kjeld was elected as head of the cathedral chapter school and around 1145 he was elected dean of the canons. Kjeld was apparently a very caring, generous, and compassionate man who gave all he managed for the sick, poor, and needy. It is told in his biography that when Viborg city in 1145 was threatened by fire, Kjeld ran to the tower of the cathedral, where he prayed fervently to God to spare the city and the church, after which the fire raging slowed noticeably.

On one occasion, while traveling to Lund, he was captured by Slavs and had to pay a ransom. Arriving at his destination, he was reimbursed. The archbishop gave him his ring, and the king gave him much gold -all of which Kjeld ended up distributing to the poor. Despite the fact that the canons had chosen Kjeld as their dean, there soon arose disputes, apparently because they did not like his generous distribution of the cathedral chapter funds to the poor. The canons elected a new dean and Kjeld moved to Aalborg for a while. Though Kjeld was popular in Aalborg he longed for spreading the Christian faith and the ability to achieve martyrdom among the Wends. He went on a pilgrimage to Rome, where he visited the tombs of the Apostles and had an audience with Pope Eugene III (1145–1153). He sought the pope's permission to go on a mission among the Wends, but although he got the authorization, the Pope expressed that he would rather see Kjeld return to Viborg and continue his work as dean of the cathedral chapter. The Pope wrote to the cathedral chapter who had to bow and take Kjeld back. But soon after, in 1150, Kjeld died in Viborg and was buried in the cathedral.

== Cult ==
Some time after, stories of miracles at Kjeld grave began to spread. He was seen as a healer and helper. The sick became healthy after visits to the tomb, and the blind especially seem to have benefited from a visit to the tomb; according to the saint's biography at least twelve people had their sight restored. The Bishop Niels I had a vita prepared and petitioned Rome for the canonization of Kjeld. In 1188 Pope Clement III (1187–1191) consented, and the Archbishop Absalon celebrated Kjeld's beatification locally, which occurred on 11 July 1189.

St. Kjeld is also called Ketillus (a variation on his name) and also sometimes Exuperian, after a name he took upon ordination to the priesthood. He has also been called the "St. Francis of Assisi of the North."

The center of the cult of Saint Kjeld was the cathedral in Viborg. Here they had a Saint Kjeld chapel with a Saint Kjeld altar and a shrine with a reliquary called "Saint Kjeld's Ark." The "Ark" was destroyed in 1726 when most of Viborg city, including the cathedral, was destroyed by a large fire. "Saint Kjeld Well" is in the crypt's southern chapel, which is the spot where Kjeld was initially buried and was well known for its healing powers – especially in connection with blindness.

Annually they celebrated his feast in the city on 11 July with processions, religious services, and a large market. Although his cult originated in Viborg, it spread to other dioceses, and he was also known in Sweden and Norway. Other Danish cities venerated St. Kjeld as well, and in Aarhus at the Cathedral there was also a Saint Kjeld altar.

In Viborg a Saint Kjeld Church parish was inaugurated in 1966 as a focal point for the Roman Catholic church in central and western Jutland, and later became the present Saint Kjeld Church built on the same property in 2008.

Kjeld is the patron saint of canons.
