= Viborg Cathedral =

Coordinates: 56°27′1.8″N 9°24′44.39″E

- Danish: Viborg Domkirke, Vor Frue Domkirke
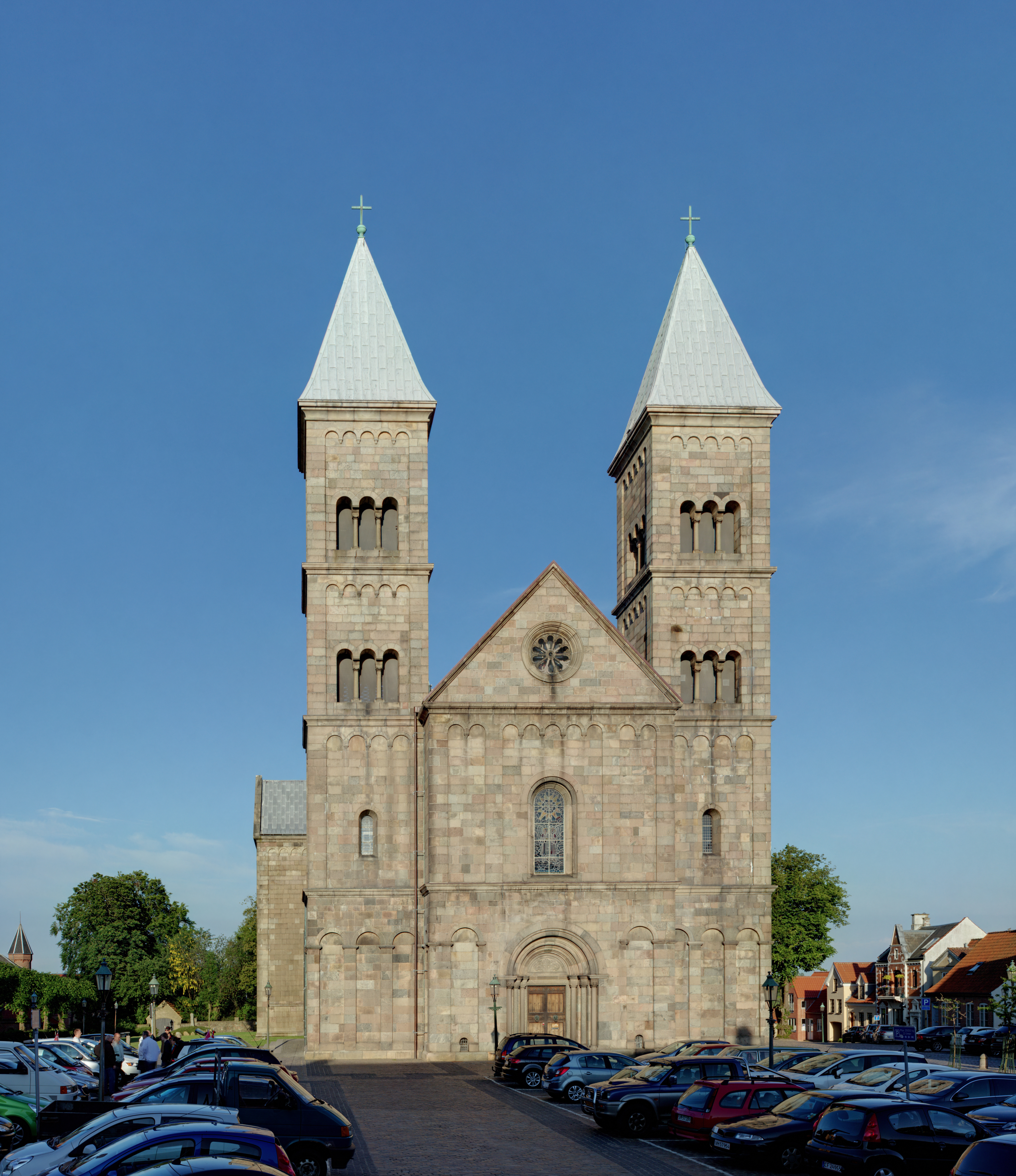

- Location within Denmark
- Location: Viborg
- Country: Denmark
- Denomination: Church of Denmark
- Previous denomination: Catholic Church
- Website: viborgdomsogn.dk

History
- Status: Cathedral
- Founded: 1876

Viborg Cathedral, Our Lady Cathedral (Danish: Viborg Domkirke eller Vor Frue Domkirke) is the site of one of Denmark's most important historic churches located in the town of Viborg in the northern part of central Jutland. The modern building is a 19th-century construction based on Lund Cathedral in southern Sweden, which bears no resemblance to the medieval cathedral that stood on the site since 1130.

== History of religion in Denmark ==
The town of Viborg was one of the four major centers for religion and politics in ancient Denmark. As early as 800, there was a Viking Era settlement at Viborg, which lies in north central Jutland with connections to the Limfjord, an important waterway through Jutland until modern times.

The people of Denmark were religious people, but it is difficult to know precisely how they practiced religion, because they did not write about it themselves, and the descriptions of early Christian missionaries only hint at how and what the Danes worshiped. Scholars suggest that Danish life was centered in a region led by chiefs. Perhaps a reminder of the days when the Danes were several tribes who settled in Jutland and the islands with a common language and culture. Nearly everyone was connected to the land and the sea for the necessities of life.

Danes followed the gods who oversaw different aspects of life. For example, fertility deities Freyr and Nordyr were important for planting and harvesting. From time to time during the year, people made offerings and performed prescribed rituals to guarantee a successful harvest. Odin was the god of warriors, and when the men set off across the sea to ravage and plunder, the aid of Odin and Thor would have been critical. In addition to the pantheon in Old Norse religion (Æsir), the world was filled with less glorious beings who had more of an impact regularly. The fields, forests, moors and the sea were inhabited by various spirits, sprites, demons, and monsters that lurked in the shadows. Daily life incorporated rituals to encourage luck, health, and wealth and avert evil, envy, and accidents. Religion in Denmark was not organized in the sense of an organized religion or even a common set of beliefs or practices throughout Denmark. Their way of living from day to day incorporated religion on an "as needed" basis.

There were sacred spaces in all areas of Denmark, especially springs (kilder), which were often the site of local worship of the local land spirits. Beech groves of magnificent height and age would be akin to outdoor cathedrals where silence reigned when the help of the gods was invoked. High hills in a country with no real mountains would be another natural place that would draw people to worship. While people in other parts of northern Europe worshiped stone or wooden images in sacred enclosures, nothing like that has been recorded in Denmark. Danish religion before 695 was not a single religion but many local variations on common themes.

=== Missionaries ===
As far as is recorded, the first Christian missionary to set foot in Denmark, probably only penetrating the south, perhaps Hedeby in Schleswig, was St. Willibrord (658-739), a Saxon monk from Northumbria with strong connections to the imperial court of the Carolingian kings. The collapse of his mission to Friesland in 695 left him without anyone else to convert, so he turned north and went to the pagan Danes. All we know is that he failed to convert anyone, but succeeded in bringing back some young men whom he hoped to teach and train to become the next generation of missionaries to the north. No more is known of the young men. Virtually nothing is known of Denmark for the next 120 years, when the first successful missionaries brought Christian ideas and beliefs to the Danes.

Missionaries from the combined Archdiocese of Hamburg Bremen in Germany were specifically tasked with bringing Christianity to the people of the North. The Apostle of the North, Ansgar (801-865), arrived in southern Denmark in 822. In the short term, Ansgar had the same luck as Willibrord did, but he lived long enough to persist and, in the end, persuaded the great men of southern Denmark that Christianity and the friendship that it brought with the Frankish empire on their southern borders was something to seriously consider. Ansagar's approach was that the people of the north would be won over little by little and that instead of razing the sacred groves, the sites should be used for Christian churches and in that way win over the hearts of the people. He also decided that if he could win over the chiefs, nobles, or kings, the people would follow.

=== Regional assembly ===
Viborg was the location of one of the three great regional assembly places in Denmark. (landsting) The first recorded proclamation of a King of Denmark was at Viborg for King Hardecanute in 1027. The monk, Ælnoth of Canterbury, apparently attended the Viborg assembly before 1120 and wrote "There (at Viborg) assembled rapidly great crowds from all over Jutland, some for trade in the market, others went there to talk. Thereby, laws are established, and it is determined whether (old) laws are still in force and, at the same time, made effective. Whatever is agreed upon by the unified voice of the crowd cannot without punishment be set aside anywhere in Jutland."

== Bishops in Viborg ==
Viborg Cathedral has been the seat of a bishop since 1065 when Jutland was divided into three dioceses, one being the Diocese of Viborg, created from the older Diocese of Ribe in southern Jutland. While nothing is known of the first church in Viborg, it can be supposed that it was a small timber church with a short nave and choir. No remains of such a building have been found. But if it follows the pattern of other cathedrals in Denmark, it would be on or near the site of the present structure. A stone cathedral was built on the present site and part of its foundations can still be seen in the crypt of the modern cathedral. In 1080 King Canute IV gave several farms to the diocese to fund the bishopric and chapter.

The second cathedral dedicated to St Mary and later called "Our Lady Cathedral" (Vor Frue Domkirke) was begun about 1130 on the site of a wooden church which was built in Viking times by Bishop Eskild. Eskild was murdered before the altar of St. Margaret's church, now Asmild Church (Asmild Kirke), on the orders of Erik Emune, who was in rebellion against King Niels in 1133. The men who slaughtered bishop Eskild were never brought to justice. The cathedral was built of Danish granite and sandstone in Romanesque style with half-rounded arches supporting a flat timber ceiling. The church consisted of a long nave, two side aisles, short, stubby transepts, and a choir with a rounded apse. Two towers flanked the main entrance with tall, slim spires.

Saint Kjeld (Ketil) (ca. 1105–1150) was a saintly man according to accounts, and when a fire broke out in the city and threatened the cathedral, Kjeld climbed into the steeple and began to pray so earnestly that the fire halted without damaging the cathedral. Kjeld died on 27 September 1150. Almost immediately, miracles were reported and people flocked to Viborg to pray at Kjeld's grave. Twelve individuals received their sight after praying at his tomb. Due to the efforts of Bishop Niels I, Kjeld was pronounced a saint by Pope Clement III in 1188. With great ceremony, Kjeld's remains were moved into the cathedral for the veneration of the faithful in 1189. Unusually, his reliquary was hung from the vaulting of the chapel built for him on the north side of the church. The cathedral was completed under Bishop Niels about 1200. He also founded the Hospital of St Michael in Viborg. In time, many other ecclesiastical buildings surrounded the cathedral. The cathedral also had a chapel for St Anna and the Our Lady Chapel. At some point, relics of St Willehad the Archbishop of Bremen in the 780's, were brought to Viborg and placed in St Kjeld's chapel.

Perhaps Viborg's most influential Bishop was Gunnar. Having been educated in Paris and been a Cistercian abbot, Bishop Gunnar wrote down the Law of Jutland ({Jydske Lov) and wrote the preface to it, the first time that Denmark had a code of law by which the people of Jutland were bound. It was proclaimed at Vordingborg in 1241. Upon his death in August 1251, Gunnar was buried at the entrance to St Kjeld's chapel.

=== King Erik Klipping ===
Viborg is the final resting place of King Erik Klipping (1289–1286). Erik's nickname was once thought to refer to a habit of blinking, but that has been discounted. It is thought that Klipping refers to the devalued money issued in his name. In other words, Erik Cut Rate. In 1282 Erik was at Vordingborg where he was forced to agree to the "Magna Charta of Denmark" (Danish: handfæstning), which was the first time the power of Danish kings was limited by a document. Erik was involved in a feud with his cousins and some of Denmark's powerful noble families, notably Counts Marsk Stig and Jacob of Halland. Tradition has it that after a long day's hunting, the king fell asleep in a barn in the village of Finderup, near Viborg. During the night, he was stabbed and slashed 56 times. Nine of the king's enemies were outlawed as a result of the murder. It was later believed that Archbishop Jens Grand was implicated in the plot to murder the king. He was imprisoned in terrible conditions and later escaped. Studies of the king's remains indicate that he was "mangled"; the body was not just stabbed but hacked to death (Danish: maltraktet). He was buried in front of the altar where his grave stone can still be seen.

In 1501, a fire damaged the western section of the church and destroyed the roof. The repairs were made in red brick, the most common building material of the time. Another kind of fire was about to engulf the world of Viborg Cathedral. During the bishopric of Jørgen Friis, the last Catholic Bishop of Viborg, Luther's ideas about reforming the Catholic Church swept into Viborg like a storm. Hans Tausen (1494-1561), who was to become "Denmark's Luther", was sent to Viborg by his superior in the Order of St John at Copenhagen to Viborg for heretical preaching in his Easter sermon 1525. Tausen taught the curious citizens of Viborg from his cell. The ideas which Tausen introduced to the people were accepted so readily that within weeks, Tausen was freed, and a Franciscan Abbey broken open so that people could hear his preaching indoors. Bishop Friis was unable to cope with the rising demands for changes in the liturgy and the host of issues that separated Protestants and Catholics all over Europe at the time. Viborg became the center for the Reformation in Denmark for a time. Within a year, Tausen was personal chaplain to the king. The ideas Tausen brought spread from Viborg over all of Jutland.

== After Reformation ==
By 1530, the cathedral was in the hands of Lutherans who rejected much of what the cathedral had stood for since Viking times. Friis retired to Hald Castle and in 1536 was imprisoned there, at the same time as Denmark's other Catholic bishops were imprisoned. In 1540 Friis was released upon his oath that he would submit to the new order. He was given the land and buildings of the former Vrejlev Abbey and lived out his life as a landed gentleman.

Despite Viborg's enthusiasm for all things reformed, Viborg maintained some of its Catholic traditions longer than anywhere else in Denmark. Prayers for King Eric Klipping, which were everywhere else abolished, continued to be offered until 1630. The relics of St Kjeld and St Willehad were moved from their chapels into the choir and preserved.

Fire damaged the church again in 1567. 27 June 1726 the city and the church suffered devastating fire damage leaving the bare walls and vaulting standing. The old cathedral remnants were enclosed in a Baroque style building that was poorly constructed by 1770. The towers were capped with short "coffee pots" according to locals who remembered the high spires before the fire.

== Rebuilding ==
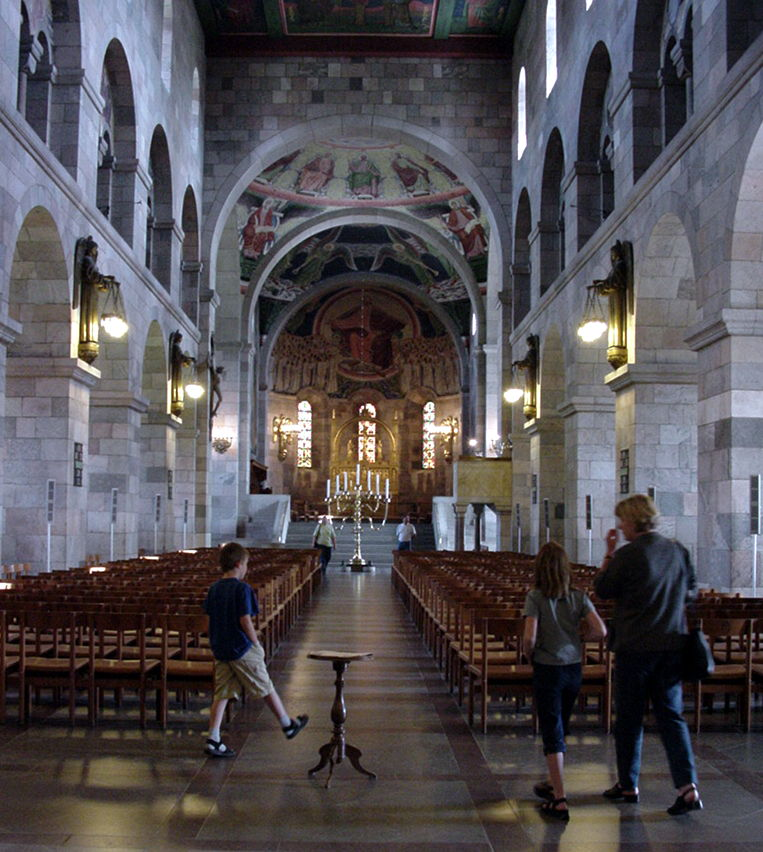
Interior of the current church.

The church was closed due to lack of funds, and between 1800 and 1814, it was used as a grain silo.

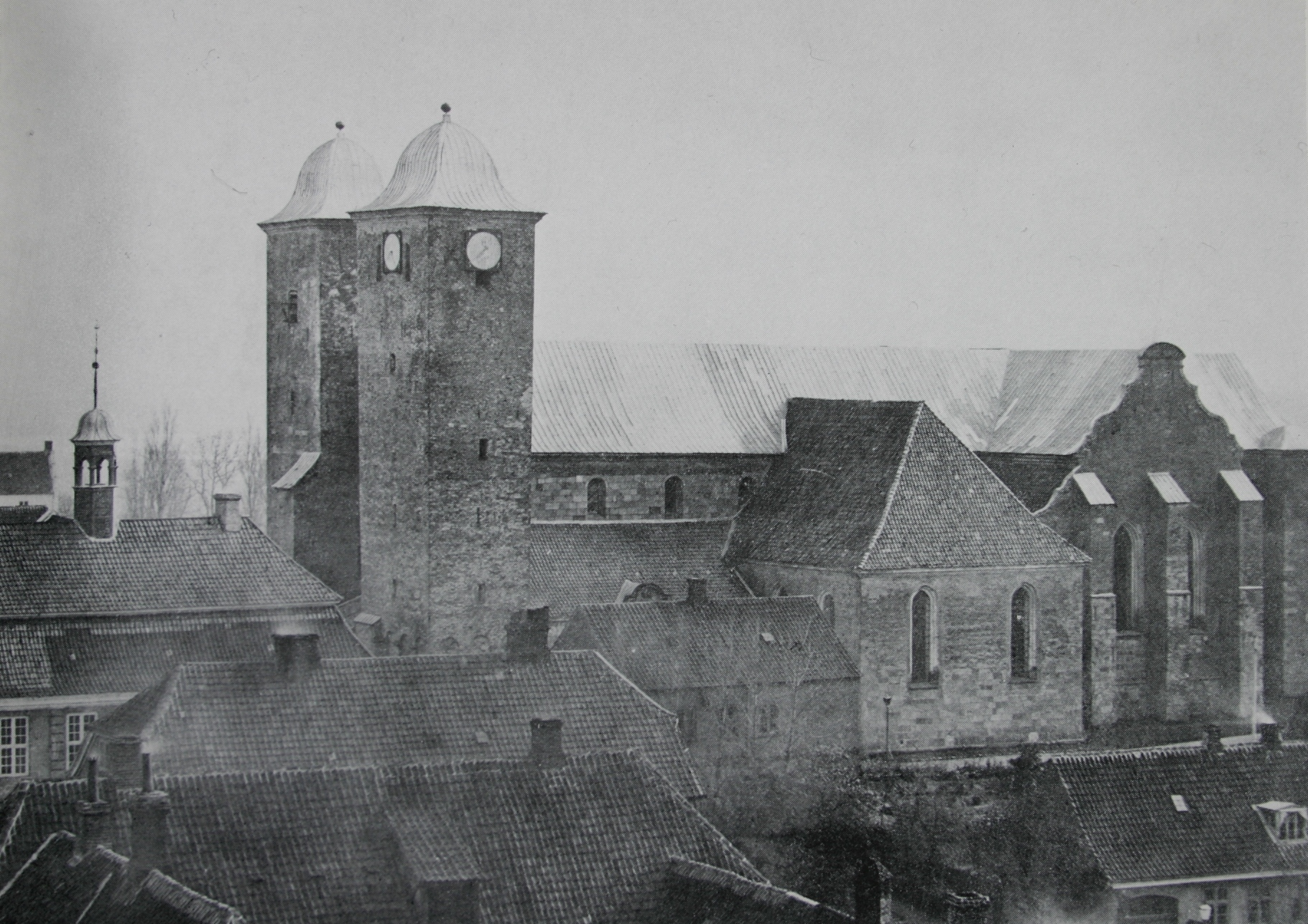
The 'old cathedral' in 1863.

In 1859, in preparation for restoring the cathedral, it was decided that the walls were so unstable that the church would need to be dismantled and be rebuilt. The designer, Julius Tholle, wanted to keep as much of the medieval building as was feasible and incorporate it into the new building. In 1863, the process of tearing the church down was completed and the cornerstone for the new cathedral was laid. Tholle died in 1871 and his plan was scrapped. The older sections which were deemed too unsalvageable, were torn down.

Viborg Cathedral was rebuilt in brick, and then a granite facade attached to achieve the look of a granite church for significantly less money. The building was closely patterned after the ancient Romanesque cathedral at Lund in southern Sweden. This was a controversial decision because the appearance of the cathedral was nothing like the former building. The church was completed and consecrated in 1876. As a result, the present cathedral is a 19th-century version of what the builders thought a Romanesque cathedral should look like.

Because the entire contents of the church were lost in the 1726 fire, all the contents to be seen in the church were either taken from other churches or created by artists and craftsmen after 1876.

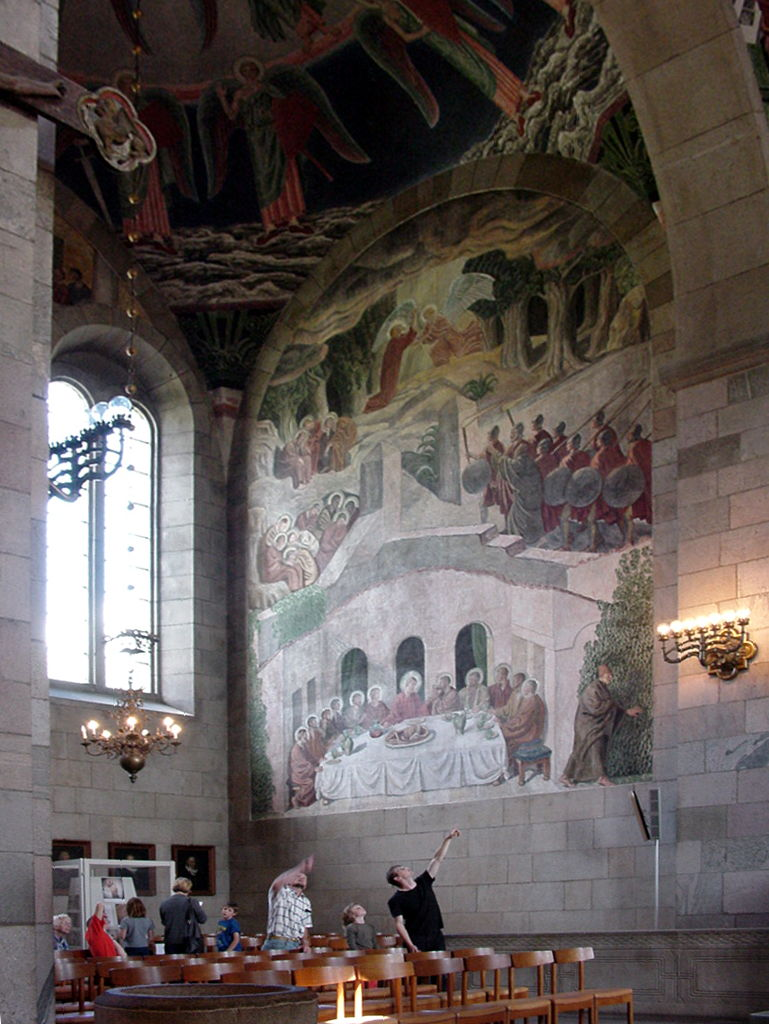
Skovgaard painting.

Joakim Skovgaard painted frescoes in the church as a reminder of the medieval paintings which were part of the decoration of the ancient cathedral between 1900 and 1913.

In the two towers hang five bells. The medieval bells were destroyed in the catastrophic fire of 1726. The oldest bell was cast in 1730 by Caspar Kønig. The next one was cast in 1730 by Caspar Kønig. The next one was cast in 1730 by Caspar Kønig. The next one was cast in 1837 by P. P. Meilstrup den Ældre. The newest bell was cast in 1896 by B. Løw & Søn.

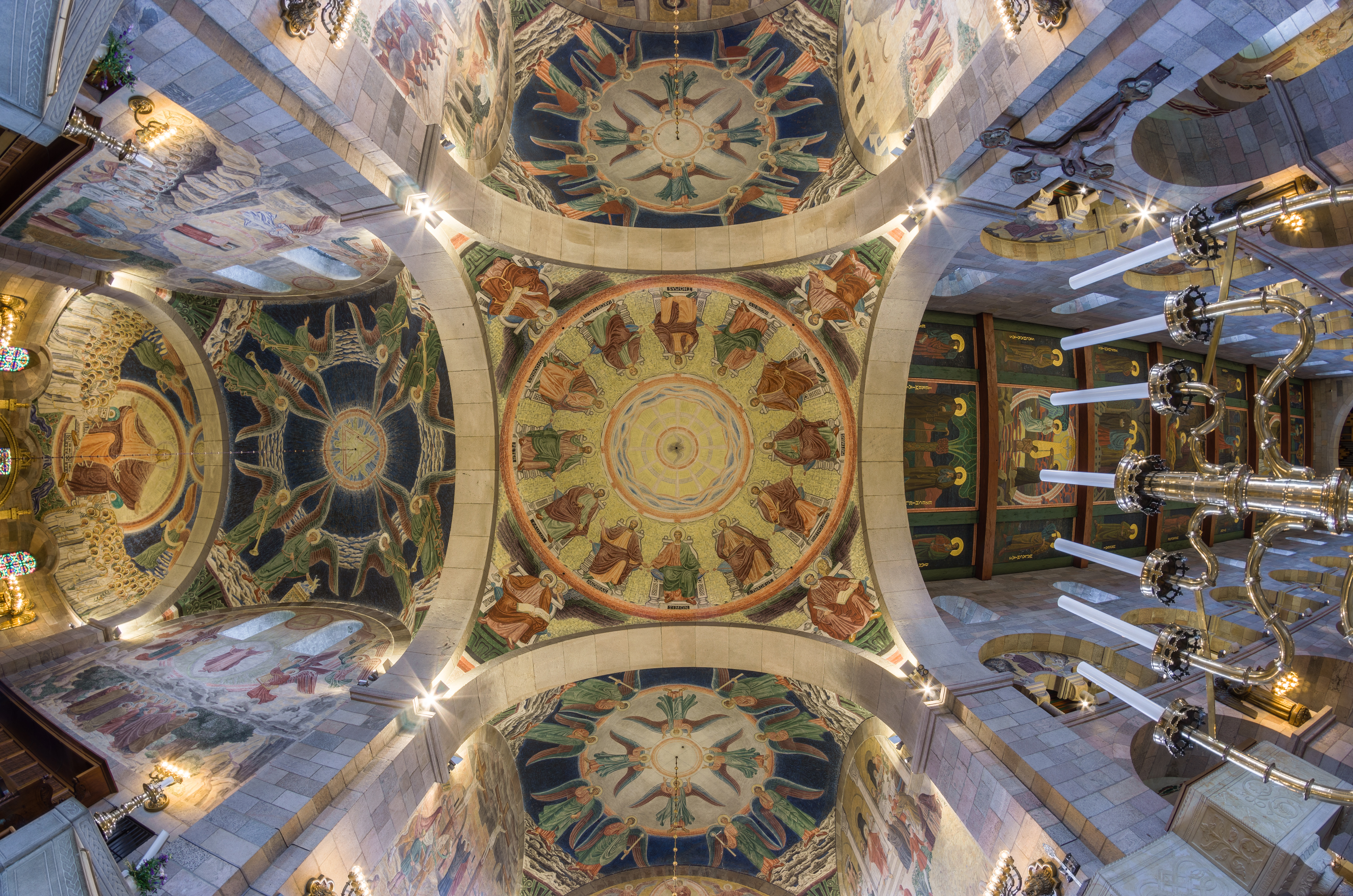
Ceiling of the cathedral

== Church contents ==
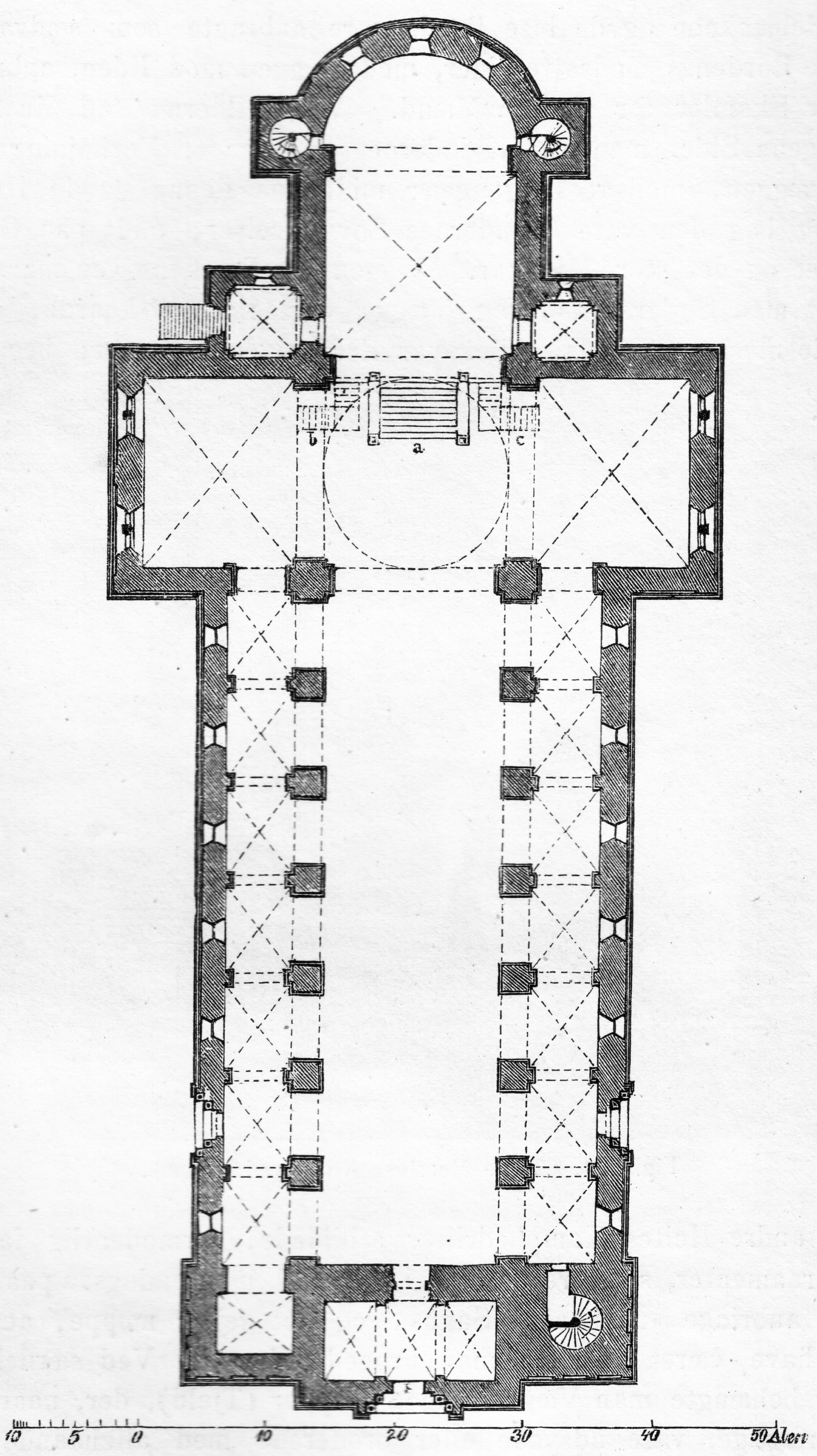
Church plan.

A few pieces of the old cathedral were incorporated into the modern building. The carved Timpani over the south door was included. Two carved stones now set in the apse were used one more time.

The large seven branch candelabra on the altar was created in Lubeck in 1494.

The sandstone pulpit was carved for the new cathedral by the sculptor Rosenfalk modeled after the work of H Bissen.

The baptismal font was a gift to the cathedral from () church.

The altar is a copy of the "Golden Altar" found at Sahl Church in Vinderup, Denmark. It was created by CC Peters in the style of a medieval gilt altar.

The crypt is the oldest part of the church and has three aisles.

== Other sources ==
- Chantepie de la Saussaye (2013) Religion of the Teutons (HardPress Publishing) ISBN 978-1313780889
