= Leif Thor Olafsson =

Roman Catholic bishop (died 1455)

Most Reverend Leif Thor Olafsson
- Bishop of Bjørgvin
- Church: Catholic Church
- Diocese: Diocese of Bjørgvin
- Appointed: 14 Apr 1451
- In office: 1451–1455
- Predecessor: Olav Hartviktson
- Successor: Paolo Giustiniani
- Previous post: Bishop of Viborg (1440–1451)

Personal details
- Died: 1 September 1455 Bjørgvin, Norway

Leif Thor Olafsson, also Thorleiv Olavsson (died 1 Sep 1455), was a Roman Catholic prelate who served as Bishop of Viborg (1440–1451) and Bishop of Bjørgvin (1451–1455).

== Biography ==
In 1440, Leif Thor Olafsson was appointed during the papacy of Pope Eugene IV as Bishop of Viborg. On 14 Apr 1451, he was appointed during the papacy of Pope Nicholas V as Bishop of Bjørgvin He served as Bishop of Bjørgvin until his death on 1 Sep 1455. at Munkeliv Abbey during an attack by Hanseatic merchants pursuing Olav Nilsson, commander of the royal castle in Bergen, who had sought sanctuary in the abbey. Olav Nilsson was also killed.

Catholic Church titles
Preceded by	Bishop of Viborg; 1440–1451	Succeeded by Canute Mikkelsen
Preceded by	Bishop of Bjørgvin; 1451–1455	Succeeded by Paolo Giustiniani
