= Niels Friis =

Danish bishop of Viborg 1498–1508 (died 1508)

Most Reverend Niels Friis
- Bishop of Viborg
- Church: Catholic Church
- Diocese: Diocese of Viborg
- In office: 1498–1508
- Predecessor: Niels Glob
- Successor: Erik Kaas

Personal details
- Died: 1508 Viborg, Denmark

Niels Friis (died 1508) was a Roman Catholic prelate who served as Bishop of Viborg (1498–1508).

== Biography ==
On 4 December 1498, Niels Friis was appointed during the papacy of Pope Alexander VI as Bishop of Viborg. He served as Bishop of Viborg until his death in 1508.

Catholic Church titles
Preceded by Niels Glob	Bishop of Viborg; 1498–1508	Succeeded by Erik Kaas
