= Olav Nilsson =

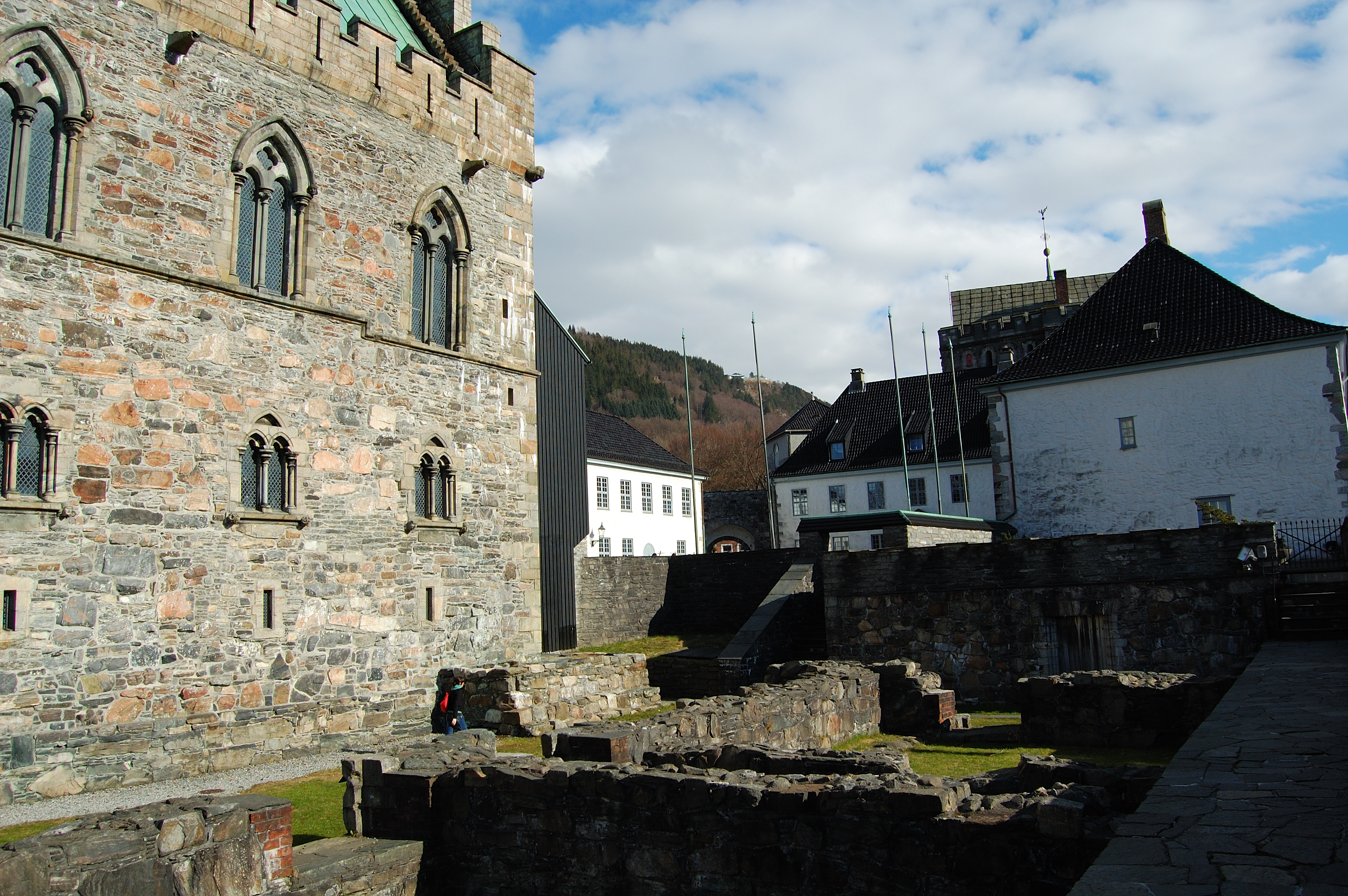
Bergenhus Fortress in Bergen

Olav Nilsson Skanke (d. 2. September 1455) was a Norwegian nobleman, knight and privateer. He was a member of the Riksråd and served as commander of Bergenhus Fortress.

== Background ==
Olav was one of the members of the Skanke family who went on to serve as knights of first the Norwegian and later the Dano-Norwegian kings. He is first mentioned in written sources in 1424, as a royal official in the city of Trondheim. Later on Olav became a wealthy landowner in both Norway and Denmark and was made a knight in 1430, together with his brother Peder. The king who declared the brothers to be knights was Erik of Pomerania. Olav was also a member of the Norwegian Riksråd.

Some time after 1430 Olav married Elisabeth Eskildsdatter from Scania, a lady of high nobility who had the right to use in her coat-of-arms the Royal Lion of Denmark. The marriage of Olav and Elisabeth was one of equal partners, this as Elisabeth personally owned large properties in Scania and was of strong will and determination. Elisabeth's position in the marriage would be clearly portrayed in the pivotal role she was to play in many of the dramatic events that took place in the latter stages of Olav's life.

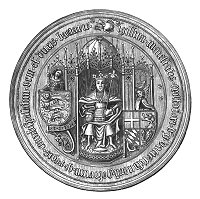
Seal of King Christopher

King Christopher wanted to improve his relations with the common people of his realm, having come to power following rebellions against his predecessor, Eric, who had allowed foreign officials and bishops to exploit the peoples he ruled over. One of the main efforts of king Christopher to mend these relations was to appoint a commission to process the complaints of the citizens of Norway. The chairman of this commission was Olav Nilsson Skanke. Olav was also appointed chief official of Bergen, the main trading centre and harbour of Norway at the time.

Perhaps chief among the foreign influences that were detested by the Norwegian people at the time was the Hanseatic League. The League operated outside Norwegian law and conducted themselves with indecency and violence. At the time, Olav was in command of Bergenhus Fortress. The citizens of Bergen complained to Olav, but the knight was not able to get support from either the king or the king's government. Acting alone, and with harsh means, Olav punished those among the Hanseatic League who had committed crimes against the city's citizens, thus earning the hatred of the League. Olav carried out attacks against both English and Hanseatic shipping. He had several captains under his command, who from the 1440s attacked ships off Western Norway. .

== Kalmar Union conflicts ==
After the death of king Christopher in 1448 the Kalmar Union experienced a period of crisis, due to the late king having had no direct heir with Sweden choosing Charles VIII as king while Denmark supported Christian I. Charles VIII was the first, in November 1449 to proclaim himself king of Norway, as Charles I of Norway, but only a few months later, in early 1450, he was deposed by Christian I of Denmark who took over the Norwegian throne. At this point war within the union seemed certain, and in response the Swedish national council asked king Charles to withdraw his claim to the Norwegian throne.

Charles would however have nothing of the sort and in 1452 sent his knight Ørian Karlson Skanke from Jemtland to conquer Trondheim, the ancient centre of Norway's kings. Control of this vital city would have greatly strengthened Charles' claim to the throne. The answer from the Danish side came quickly with knight Ørian's own relatives, Olav Nilsson Skanke and his brother Peder, marching up from the south and pushing Ørian out of Trondheim. The same thing happened all over again in 1453 with Ørian seizing Trondheim and Olav and Peder driving him out once more. This second battle finally concluded the conflict over succession and ended the battles between knights of the Skanke family.

== Dismissal by the King ==
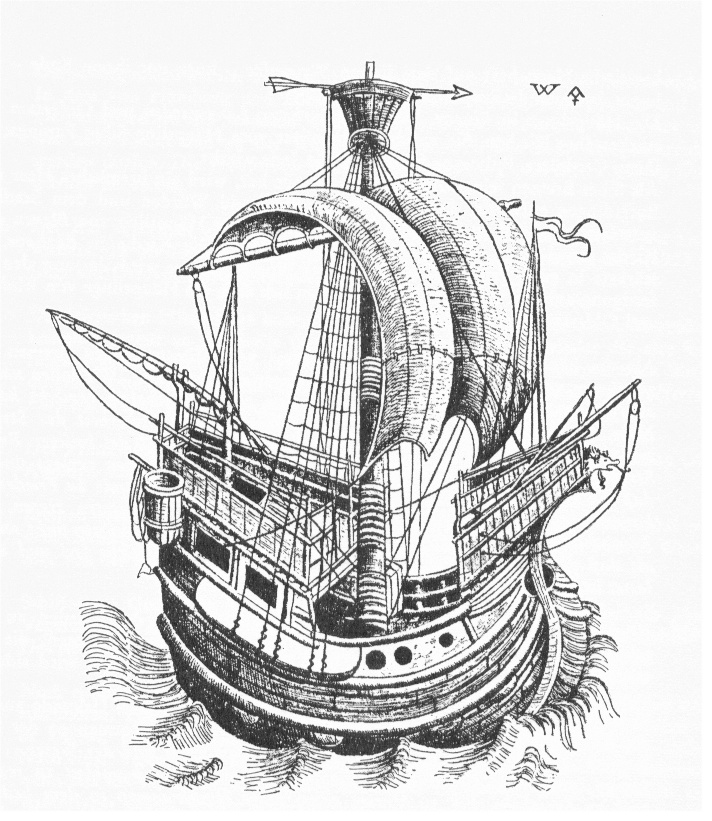
Hanseatic vessel

Knight Olav served King Christopher as a privateer during the king's wars against the Hansa. After king Christian I made peace with the trading alliance, Olav continued to attack Hanseatic ships against the wishes of the king. Olav Nilsson Skanke had previously earned the hatred of the Hanseatic League through his conduct as chief official in Bergen. As early as in 1446 the League issued official complaints against Olav at a Bergen town council meeting, and after numerous complaints King Christian I of Denmark yielded to the pressure and in 1453 dismissed Olav. Magnus Green (d. ca. 1473) was made the royal official of Bergen. This dismissal greatly shook Olav who felt unjustly treated after his long and loyal service to the king of the Kalmar Union and to the people of Norway. The knight refused to take this blow lying down and soon mobilized his personal resources and those of his family to regain his former position.

== War on the Hanseatic League ==
After his dismissal Olav left Bergen and went to his manorial home at Talgø Island in Ryfylke. Here he began to set the wheels in motion towards his response to the Hansa's role in his dismissal. Olav soon equipped several ships and started again to wage a naval war on the League by attacking and seizing its ships in the North Sea. Operating from a base on the east coast of Scotland, Olav captured a large percentage of the Hanseatic vessels heading for Bergen. Both Olav's wife Elisabeth and his two sons were each commanding ships in the fleet harrying the Hansa vessels. Elisabeth was especially successful and rapidly became renowned all over Northern Europe for her wisdom and bravery.

== Olav Nilsson takes Älvsborg ==
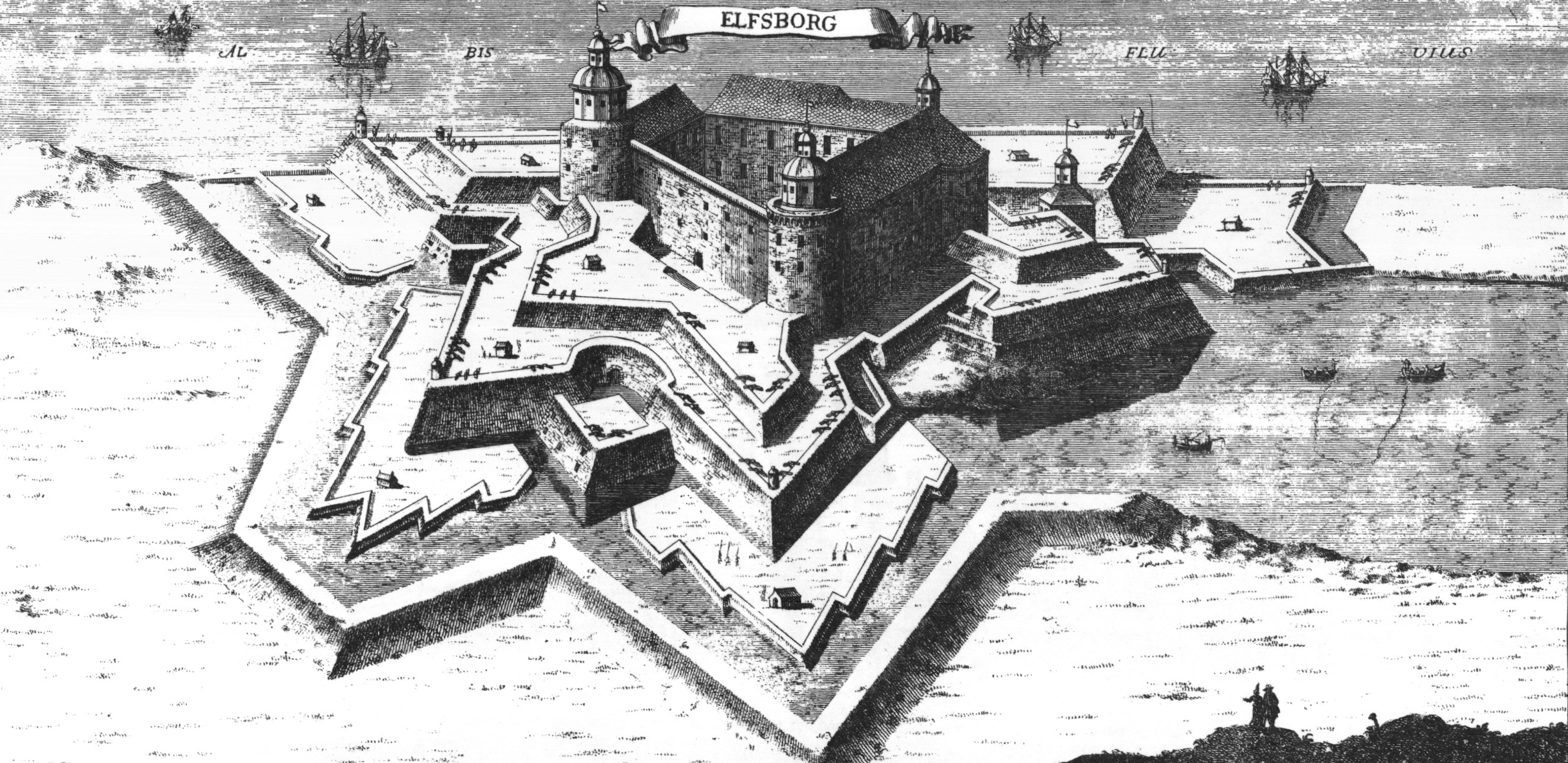
Älvsborg fortress

Soon the campaign against the League became so successful that Olav expanded it to the coast of Sweden, attacking the Swedes at every weak point he could find. In one of his attacks Olav managed to capture the Swedish fortress of Älvsborg in 1455 and garrison it with his own loyal men. This fortress was of vital importance to the Swedes due to its strategic location commanding the shipping routes between Denmark and Norway. In addition to occupying this favorable blocking position Ãlvsborg was also the major Swedish strongpoint in the small strip of land the Swedes had controlled since the mid-13th century, separating the Danish province of Halland from the Norwegian Bohuslen. The small coastal area of the province Västergötland was up until the 1658 Treaty of Roskilde Sweden's only access to the Skagerrak and the North Sea.

At the time the relationship between Denmark and Sweden was very tense, and it was in this atmosphere that Olav offered to hand over the fortress to the Danes. Olav made it clear that he would only surrender the fortress into Danish hands if he was reinstituted to his former position in Bergen. If these conditions were not met he would hand Älvsborg back to the Swedes. In effect, Olav committed an act of extortion against the Danish Crown. As Ãlvsborg was of to great importance in the rivalry between Sweden and Denmark, King Christian I of Denmark had no choice but to agree to the vigilante knight's demands.

== Return to Bergen and death ==
Following Olav's success in forcing the Danish Crown into restoring him to his former position in Bergen he and his family returned to the city in a triumphant manner. Olav was again given command of the Bergenhus Fortress. Shortly after Olav's return to Bergen, Hanseatic merchants attacked him at Munkeliv Abbey. In the attack which destroyed the abbey, Olav was killed together with Leif Thor Olafsson, Bishop of Bergen and about 60 other Norwegians. Olav's son was one of those who died with him.

== Bibliography ==
- Engdal, Odd G. (2006). Norsk marinehistorisk atlas 900–2005 (in Norwegian). Bergen: Vigmostad & Bjørke AS. ISBN 82-419-0454-1.
- Hetland, Ingebrigt (2008). Pirater og sjørøvere i norske farvann (in Norwegian). Oslo: Pantagruel Forlag. ISBN 978-82-7900-323-6.
- Øye, Ingvild (1994). Bergen and the German Hansa. Bergen: Bryggens Museum. ISBN 82-90289-52-9.
