= Elizabeth Friis =

American bioengineer

Elizabeth Annamaria "Lisa" Friis is an American bioengineer whose research interests include biomaterials and the biomechanics of the spine. She is C. E. and M. J. Spahr Professor and chair of the Department of Mechanical Engineering at the University of Kansas.

Friis has a PhD from Wichita State University, and worked in the Orthopaedic Research Institute of Wichita, Kansas from 1987 until 2001, when she joined the University of Kansas faculty. She is a Fellow of the American Institute for Medical and Biological Engineering, named to its 2019 class of fellows "for outstanding contributions to the field of translational bioengineering research and education in biomaterials and entrepreneurship".
