= Vitus Friis =

Danish footballer (born 2007)

Personal information
- Date of birth: 31 March 2007 (age 19)
- Place of birth: Svendborg, Denmark
- Height: 1.86 m (6 ft 1 in)
- Position: Midfielder

Team information
- Current team: OB
- Number: 21

Youth career
- Tåsinge fB
- SfB-Oure
- OB

Senior career*
Years	Team	Apps	(Gls)
2025–	OB	1	(0)
- * Club domestic league appearances and goals as of 12:38, 3 January 2026 (UTC)

Vitus Friis (born 31 March 2007) is a Danish footballer who plays as a midfielder for Danish Superliga club OB.

== Club career ==
=== OB ===
Raised in Svendborg, Friis began his youth career at Tåsinge fB before later moving to SfB-Oure, prior to joining the youth setup at OB. There, he quickly became a key player across the various youth teams, which also resulted in two one-year contract extensions.

On 22 September 2025, OB confirmed that the 18-year-old Friis had been promoted to the first-team squad and had simultaneously extended his contract until June 2027. Just one day later, on 23 September 2025, he made his official debut for OB, as he came on as a substitute in the closing minutes of a Danish Cup match.

A few days after his official debut, on 28 September 2025, Friis also made his Danish Superliga debut, as he replaced Brøndby IF’s opponent Ismahila Ouédraogo in the closing minutes of the match against Brøndby IF.
