= Diocese of Viborg =

Diocese of Viborg Viborg Stift
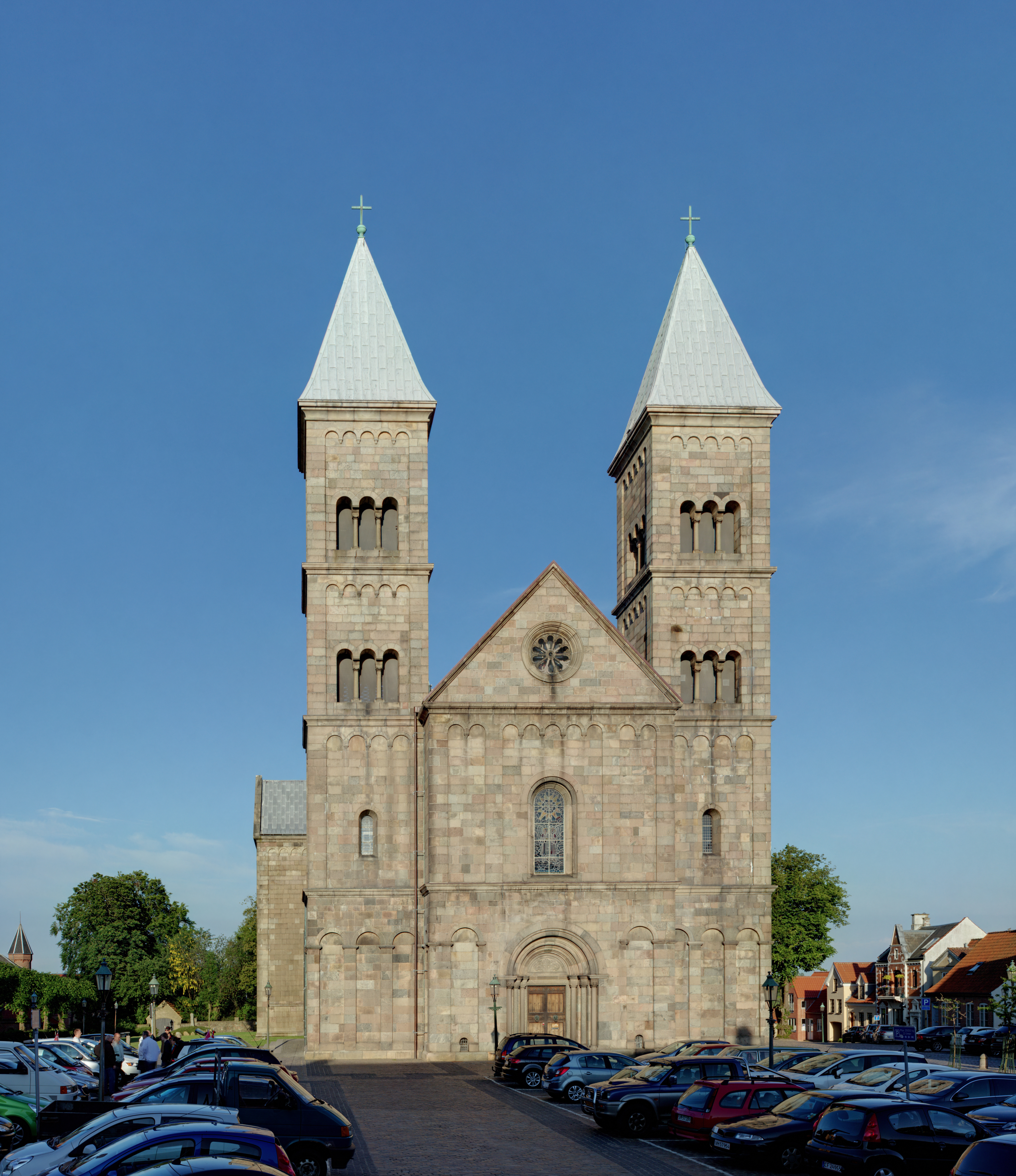
- The Cathedral of the diocese.

- Coat of arms

Location
- Country: Denmark

Statistics
- Population: Total: (as of 2016); 417,630
- Members: 355,691 (85.2%)

Information
- Denomination: Church of Denmark
- Cathedral: Viborg Cathedral

Current leadership
- Bishop: Henrik Stubkjær

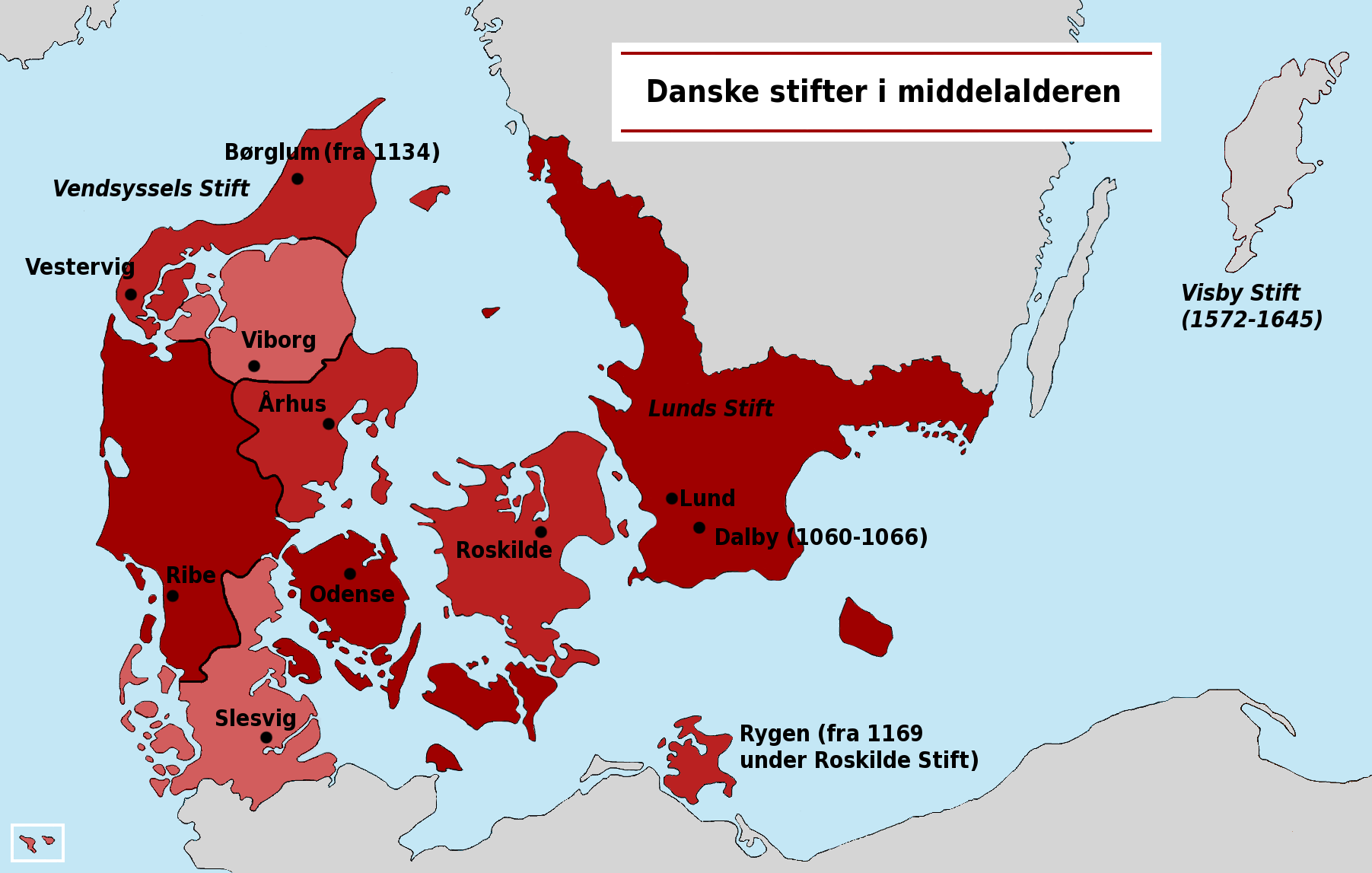
Danish dioceses in the Middle Ages

The Diocese of Viborg is a diocese within the Church of Denmark, covering the western part of central Jutland. Viborg Cathedral in the city of Viborg serves as the seat of the diocese's bishop. The diocese has the highest ratio of church members in Denmark, about 85%.

Historically, it was a Lutheran church diocese in the mid- to late-16th century, when it became vacant, but was then re-established c. 1618, with Olav Elimaeus as its Bishop.

== List of Bishops ==
- Jacob Schøning, 1537–1549
- Kjeld Juel, 1549–1571
- Peder Thøgersen, 1571–1595
  - Vacant (1595–1617)
- Hans Iversen Wandal, 1617–1641
  - Vacant (1641–1661)
- Peder Villadsen, 1661–1673
- Søren Glud, 1673–1693
- Henrik Gerner, 1693–1700
- Bartholomæus Deichman, 1700–1713
- Caspar Wildhagen, 1713–1720
- Søren Lintrup, 1720–1725
- Johannes Trellund, 1725–1735
- Andreas Wøldike, 1735–1770
- Christian Michael Rottbøll, 1770–1780
- Peder Tetens, 1781–1805
- Jens Bloch, 1805–1830
- Nicolaj Esmark Øllgaard, 1830–1854
- Otto Laub, 1854–1878
- Jørgen Swane, 1878–1901
- Alfred Sveistrup Poulsen, 1901–1921
- Johannes Gøtzche, 1921–1936
- Axel Malmstrøm, 1936–1951
- Christian Baun, 1951–1968
- Johannes W. Jacobsen, 1968–1985
- Georg S. Geil, 1985–1996
- Karsten Nissen, 1996–2014
- Henrik Stubkjær, 2014–present

== See also ==
- Ancient Diocese of Viborg
- St. Peter's Priory, Grinderslev
