= Jørgen Friis (bishop) =

Danish Catholic priest (1495–1547)

Most Reverend Jørgen Friis
- Bishop of Viborg
- Church: Catholic Church
- Diocese: Diocese of Viborg
- In office: 1521–1536
- Predecessor: Erik Kaas
- Successor: None

Jørgen Friis was a Roman Catholic prelate who served as Bishop of Viborg (1521–1536).

== Biography ==
On 7 Jan 1521, Jørgen Friis was appointed during the papacy of Pope Leo X as Bishop of Viborg. He served as Bishop of Viborg until his resignation in 1536.

Catholic Church titles
Preceded by Erik Kaas	Bishop of Viborg; 1521–1536	Succeeded by None
