= St. Nicholas' Priory, Ribe =

Former Benedictine nunnery in Denmark

St. Nicholas' Priory (Danish: Sankt Nikolai Kloster) was a Benedictine nunnery founded in 1170 in Ribe, Denmark.

== History ==
The foundation of St. Nicholas' Priory in Ribe was the result of events at Seem Abbey, a Benedictine double monastery established by the Bishops of Ribe in the first third of the 12th century. After allegations of unruliness and impropriety during the 1160s the nuns were moved out in 1170 to a new priory built for them by Bishop Ralph, closer to Ribe and episcopal supervision.

The new priory at Ribe, dedicated to Saint Nicholas, consisted of a quadrilateral enclosure, of which the church formed one side and ranges of conventual buildings the other three. The prioress ran the community, while a local nobleman held the office of provost (or honorary prior) and represented the nuns in secular matters. Mass was said by a local priest. The church was open to the people of Ribe, but the nuns were separated from them by iron gates around the choir.

By the reign of Christian II (1513–23) the reputation of the nuns of Ribe for immorality was notorious, to the extent that they were used as a stock example of debauchery by early Danish Lutheran preachers: Thomas Lillelund, for example, accused them of institutionalized whoring (Danish: horeri). When Christian's successor, Frederik II, refused to protect them, the nuns were driven from the priory by the citizens of Ribe.

Denmark became officially Lutheran in 1536 and all religious houses and their income properties reverted to the crown. The former priory was reopened as a secular institution where a few of the nuns were allowed to live until 1560, when the citizens of Ribe complained about the cost of maintaining all ten churches and four monasteries and the leper hospital. With the agreement of the crown, the church of Ribe Abbey, now St. Catherine's Church, was made the parish church of Ribe, and the medieval Ribe Cathedral was confirmed as the seat of the Lutheran Diocese of Ribe, but the rest of the churches and religious houses, including St. Nicholas' Priory, were demolished and the materials used for other buildings.

== Sources ==
- Salmonsens Konversationalexikon, nd: Ribe (in Danish)
