= Bishop of Ribe =

The Bishop of Ribe, in Denmark, may refer to a bishop of either:

- the former Roman Catholic diocese of Ribe, dissolved in 1536: see Ancient Diocese of Ribe; or
- the present Lutheran Diocese of Ribe
