= Elof Westergaard =

Danish theologian (born 1962)

The Right Reverend Elof Westergaard
- Bishop of Ribe
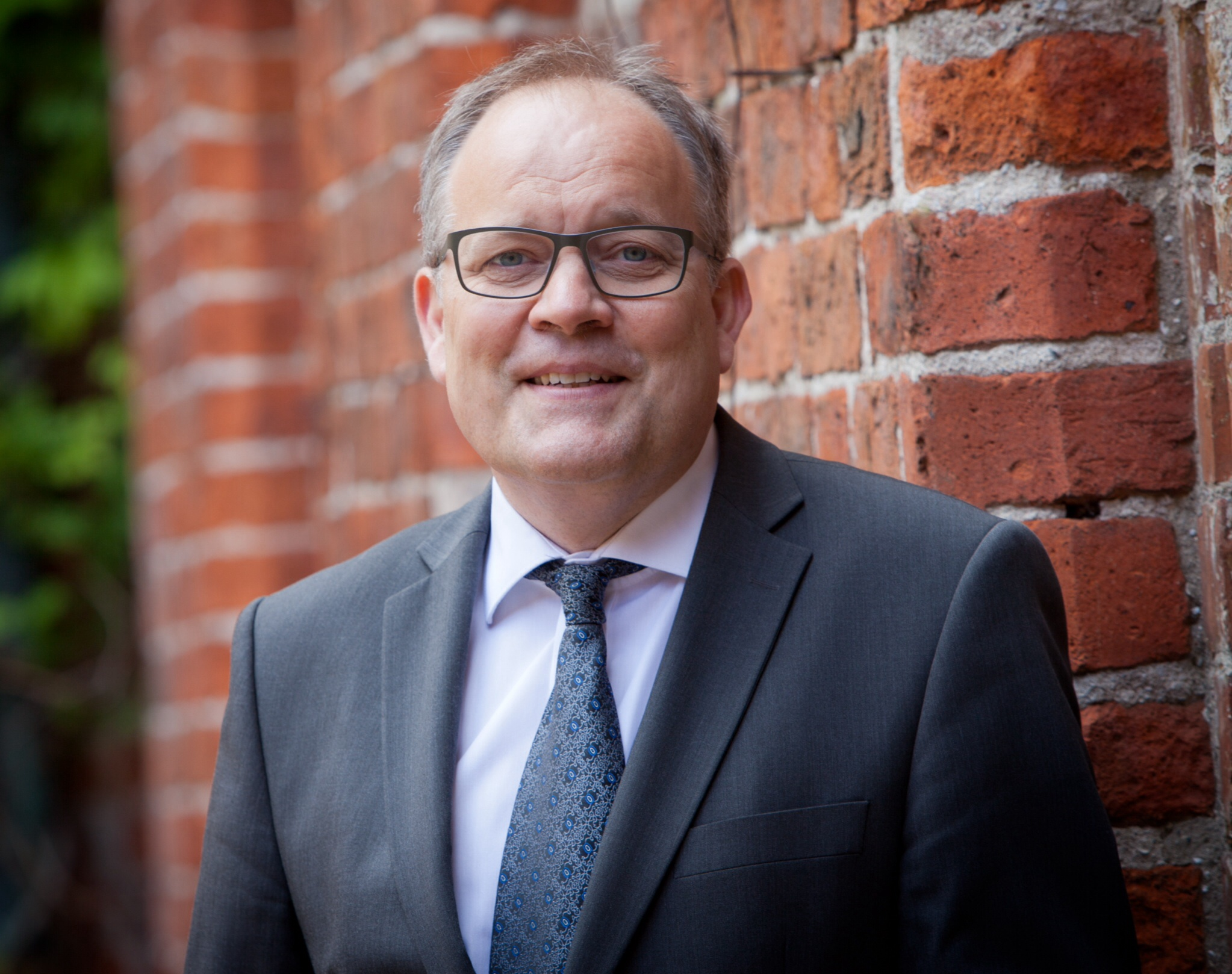
- Church: Church of Denmark
- Diocese: Ribe
- Elected: 2014
- Predecessor: Elisabeth Dons Christensen

Orders
- Consecration: 1 June 2014

Personal details
- Born: 31 March 1962 (age 64) Lemvig, Denmark
- Denomination: Lutheran
- Spouse: Kirsten Margrethe Andersen
- Children: 3
- Education: Aarhus University

Elof Westergaard (born 31 March 1962) is a Danish theologian who since 2014 has been a Bishop of Ribe.

== Priest ==
After graduating in theology from Aarhus University in 1991, he was ordained as a priest in Ribe Cathedral . He served as the vicar of Husby and Sønder Nissum parishes in the Diocese of Ribe during the period 1991-2005. From 2005 to 2014 he was pastor of Mariehøj Sogn and 2009-2014 also Dean of Silkeborg deanery.

== Bishop ==
When Elisabeth Dons Christensen retired as Bishop of Ribe in 2014, Elof Westergaard announced his candidacy for the post. At the beginning of April 2014, he was elected as the new bishop of Ribe against three other candidates in 1st grade. He collected 64.35% of the votes. On June 1 that year he was consecrated and installed as bishop in Ribe Cathedral.

== Bibliography ==
- Opstandelsens billeder (2005)
- Sten over Muld (2009)
- Det blændende lys (2012)
