= Gudum Priory =

Former Benedictine nunnery in Denmark

Gudum Priory was a small Benedictine nunnery located in west central Jutland, Denmark from the 1260s until 1573.

== History ==
Gudum Priory was one of three in the isolated sand hills near Lemvig in northwest Jutland under the jurisdiction of the Bishop of Ribe. The original Gudum Priory was built in the valley less than a kilometer southwest of modern Gudum church near what is called the Klostermølle River as early as 1260 and not later than 1268. The papal recognition letter which permits the Benedictines to establish Gudum Priory was recently discovered, though as yet no particulars are available. The original priory was built on the site of Our Lady Spring (Danish: Vorfrue Kilde) in the valley near the village of Gudum, Denmark which had been inhabited since Viking times. Recent excavations by the University of Holstebro found remnants of four Viking houses at Gudum church which date back to between 800 and 900. An early (1100s) church existed at Gudum, but by 1350 it had become a ruin. A new church was constructed in 1350 in Gothic style with the new and reused materials from the older Romanesque church.

Gudum is located in the old administrative district of Hardsyssel which means 'region of the forest dwellers'. Gudum means 'God's dwelling' (Danish:gudhjem) and the name certainly dates back to Viking times. Gudum was the site of the Skodborg District Assembly (Danish:tingsted) until 1608. This made it the 'capital' of the district and brought people together for assembly and markets several times a year. The town sat astride the main road between Lemvig and Viborg, Jutland's capital at the time. The remains of old roads crisscross the region many of them focusing on Gudum.

The priory was run by the prioress who organized and administered the day-to-day life of the nuns. A prior was appointed by the bishop to take care of priestly functions required by the nuns. The position was often overlooked or remained vacant. Since the prior lived at the priory, the bishop often appointed an elderly canon or other priest from another house in the area to say mass and hear confession. The post must not have been sought after because it was so often left vacant and the nuns complained to the bishop about the lack of a prior.

In 1484 the nuns received permission from Bishop of Ribe Hartvig of Ribe to move the priory next to Gudum Church ostensibly because a flood had destroyed the chapel and 'other buildings' which had fallen into the river. No evidence remains of the original priory site. The consecration of the new priory to St. Thomas Vigilie took place in 1492. The priory was built onto the north side of the church. While no trace of the priory remain, it may be supposed that it was built in Gothic style with pointed arches and constructed out of red bricks, the most common building material of the time. It was a small house, perhaps no more than 20 nuns, if that many, at any given time. Stubber Priory, a close neighbor, often had only ten or twelve, which may be more accurate for Gudum as well. Excavations have shown that the priory had four buildings, three connected to the north of the church and a separate building across a courtyard. The entire priory was walled to separate the nuns from the rest of the town.

The church served the local town as well, so the nuns had their own entrance and partitioned section of the nave. The priory archive, mostly letter of gifts to Gudum, was preserved and even registered in 1592, but since that time all but one of the letters was lost or destroyed. Residents recounted that the letters were tossed out on the ground were gathered by local farmers and used to wipe off farm tools. The single remaining letter is a 1496 gift of property for the saying of prayers for a deceased parish resident.

Gudum Priory owned much of what is now the parish of Gudum as well as other scattered income properties in the area. A 1520 court case involving the priory and nobleman Christian Mørk over the boundary between Koksholm and Østergård farms was resolved. The priory owned the River Mill Danish:Å Mølle) after which the local river is named. It was built in 1495 by the diocese for the benefit of the priory.

=== Reformation ===
The Reformation brought about the end of Gudum Priory when Denmark became Lutheran in 1536. Christen Ovesen Skram, was named as "Superintendent" of Gudum Priory in 1534, which indicates that the parish had become Lutheran. The priory remained open until 1573, when the nuns were moved to Mariager Abbey in Djursland. A few of the nuns were too old or ill to move, so the district governor (Danish:lensmand) was required to pay for their upkeep until they died.

The priory buildings and estate were broken up into several farms. The priory itself became Gudum Kloster Farm (Danish:Gudum Klostergård).

The priory and church tower burned down in 1631 leaving no evidence it had existed. The church survived and the old entrances for the nuns and original low windows can still be seen. A bell tower was added to the medieval church after the 1631 fire.

A flood on the river in 1838 resulted in the relocation of the mill to its present location just outside Humlum on the Lemvig Road.

== Sources ==
- Gudum Kloster og Kirke (in Danish)
- Viborg Amts Miljø Pjece, nd: Klostre i Midt or Nord Jylland (in Danish)
