= List of public art in Roskilde Municipality =

This list of public art in Roskilde Municipality lists public art in Roskilde Municipality, Denmark.

== Overview ==
Roskilde's most well-known public artwork is the Roskilde Jars on Hestetorvet in front of Roskilde Railway Station. The three five meter high jars were designed by Peter Brandes and presented to the City of Roskilde as a gift on the occasion of its 1,000th anniversary. On Stændertorvet, the city's largest and most important public square, is a granite fountain built in 1895 which features various symbols from the city's coat of arms in its design. The fountain stands in front of the former city hall which now houses the tourist information office. On the same square in front of the Royal Mansion stands a statue of Hroar and Helge two legendary kings who ruled Denmark from Roskilde in the 6th century. The statue was created by Johan Galster and was the winning entry in a 1933 competition for a new artwork on the City Hall Square. Roskilde commissioned an equestrian statue of Margaret I of Denmark from Anne Marie Carl-Nielsen in the 1890s. She completed the first model in about 1897 but the final project was not completed due to lack of funding. In 2006, the equestrian statue was finally realized based on a plaster model which had been kept in the storages of Roskilde Museum. It now stands at Københavnsvej, opposite the Ro's Torv Shopping Center. A bronze statue of one of Roskilde's most famous natives, Lise Nørgaard, depicting Nørgaard sitting on a bench, is found on Algade, the city's principal pedestrian street. Outside Roskilde Museum stands a Bjørn Nørgaard statue which presents scenes from the Ragnarök legend on its four sides.

== List ==
Image	Title / individual commemorated	Location	Sculptor	Created	Installed	Source
	Andromeda Garden; Andromeda-haven	Koldekildevej	Lars Skov Nielsen	2003	2003	Ref
	Archipelago; Arkipelag	Roskilde University, Universitetsvej 1	Erik Varming	1990	1990	Ref
	Bird; Fugl	Himmelev Gymnasium, Himmelev	Erik Heide	1981	1981	Ref
	Bronze Pigeons	Duebrødre Kloster, Sct. Agnesvej 2	Gudrun Lauesen		1898	Ref
	Chinese character Kinesisk skrifttegn	Roskilde Library	Helge Holmskov	1986	1986	Ref
	Cirkelbuen	Roskilde University, Universitetsvej 1	Bjarne v. H.H. Solberg		1990	Ref
	Cobra	Herregårdsvej 30	Jørn Bromann	1991	1991	Ref
	Effort commun	Roskilde Library, Dr. Margrethesvej 14	Sonja Ferlov Mancoba		1980	Ref
	Figures for a space Figurer til en plads	Roskilde University, Universitetsvej 1	Anita Jørgensen		2001	Ref
	Foal; Føl	Roskilde Hospital, Køgevej	Gudrun Lauesen	1936	1990	Ref
	Fountain with symbols from Roskilde's coat of arms	Stændertorvet	Volmer Johannes Mørk-Hansen	1895	1895	Ref
	Frog Fountain; Frøspringvandet	Klosterengen	Karl Glem			Ref
	Gateway; Port	Roskilde University, Universitetsvej 1	Claes Hake		1990	Ref
	Genfortryllelsens Brønd	Roskilde Ring, Søndre Ringvej	Michael Thejll	1990	1990	Ref
	Goose Girl; Gåsepige	Himmelev Gymnasium, Himmelev	Gudrun Lauesen	1981	1981	Ref
	Granite and Water; Granit og vand	Klosterengen	Finn Nielsen	1995	1995	Ref
	Granite faces Granitansigter	Roskilde University, Universitetsvej 1	Ole Find			Ref
	Growth—Movement; Vækst – Bevægelse	Skomagergade	Barbara Shanklin	1993	1993	Ref
	Guapa	Stændertorvet, Latinerhaven	Gottfred Eickhoff	1942	1984	Ref
	Gustav Wied	Sct. Olsgade 11	Elise Brandes	1909	1909	Ref
	Horse Well; Hestebrønden	Hestetorvet	Karl Glem	1945	1945	Ref
	How fragile we are ...	Roskilde Fair Ground	Lars Skov Nielsen	2001	2001	Ref
	Imago	Skt Olsgade 15	Erik Varming	1994	1994	Ref
	Johannes Dam Hage, founder of the savings bank and teacher at the Latin School	Stændertorvet 5	Karl Glem			Ref
	Lenticularis	Skomagergade	Gunver Hansen			Ref
	Lise Nørgaard	Algade	Mette Agerbæk	2010	2010	Ref
	Lumo with Strong Supporters; Klumo med stærke støtter	Roskilde University, Universitetsvej 1	Jørgen Haugen Sørensen		1993	Ref
	Mads the Goat; Mads Ged	Himmelev Bygade, Himmelev	Gudrun Lauesen	1968	1969	Ref
	Memorial to the Occupation of Denmark; Mindesten for Danmarks besættelse	Stændertorvet	Knud Nellemose	1955	1955	Ref
	Monument to Steen Friis; Gravmonument over stiftskriver Steen Friis	Greyfriars Cemetery	Vilhelm Bissen		1875	Ref
	Ragnarök; Ragnarok	Roskilde Museum, Skt. Ols Stræde	Bjørn Nørgaard			Ref
	Relief	Køgevej 7	Einar Utzon-Frank	1957	1957	Ref
	Resonance; Resonans	Roskilde University, Universitetsvej 1	John Olsen		2001	Ref
	Roar and Helge	Stændertorvet	Johan Georg Castonier Galster		1939	Ref
	Roskilde Jars	Roskilde station, Hestetorvet	Peter Bonde	1998	1998	Ref
	Sculpture 2007; Skulptur 2007	Østre Kirkegård	Søren Schaarup	2007	2007	Ref
	Sun; Sol	Roskilde City Hall	Gottfred Eickhoff	1976	1976	Ref
	The Seven Days of the Week; Ugens syv dage	Folkeparken	Morten Nielsen			Ref
	The Thirsty Children; De tørstende børn	Sct. Jørgens Skole, Sønderlundsvej 58	Rudolph Tegner	1926	1958	Ref
	Tree of Life; Livets træ	St Jørgensbjerg Graveyard, Sct. Hansgade 51	Erik Varming	1975	1975	Ref
	Water stone 2004; Vandsten 2004	Margrethehåbsvej 116	Søren Schaarup	2004	2004	Ref
	Water stone 2007; Vandsten 2007	Østre Kirkegård	Søren Schaarup	2007	2007	Ref
	Wall; Mur	Maglelunden 2	Helle Vibeke Steffensen	1997	1997	Ref
	Woman figures Kvindeskulpturer	Køgevej 46B	Einar Utzon-Frank	1996	1996	Ref

== See also ==
- Listed buildings in Roskilde Municipality
- List of protected areas of Roskilde Municipality
- List of public art in Copenhagen
