= Hans Adolph Brorson =

Danish clergyman

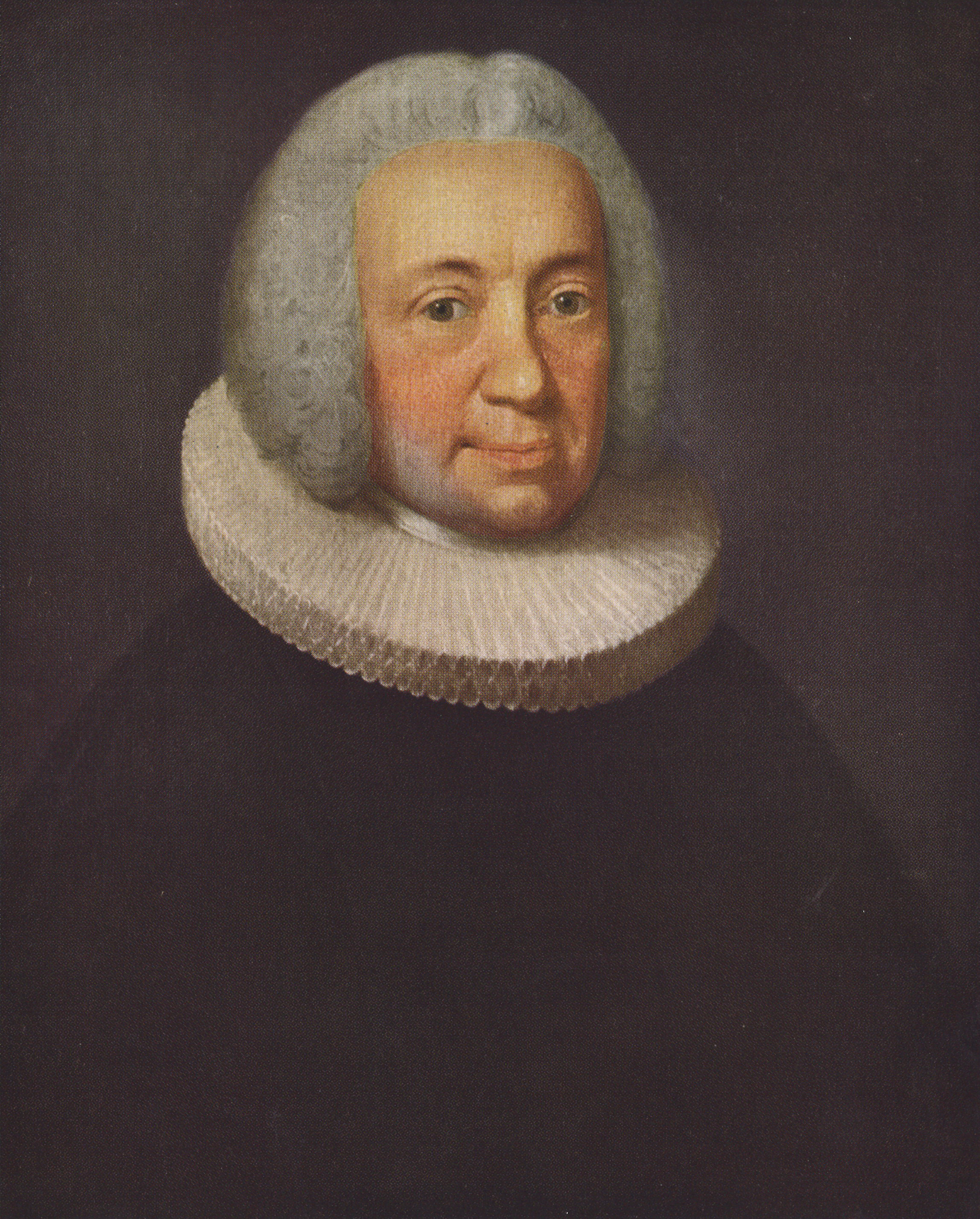
Hans Adolph Brorson portrait by Johan Hörner (1756)

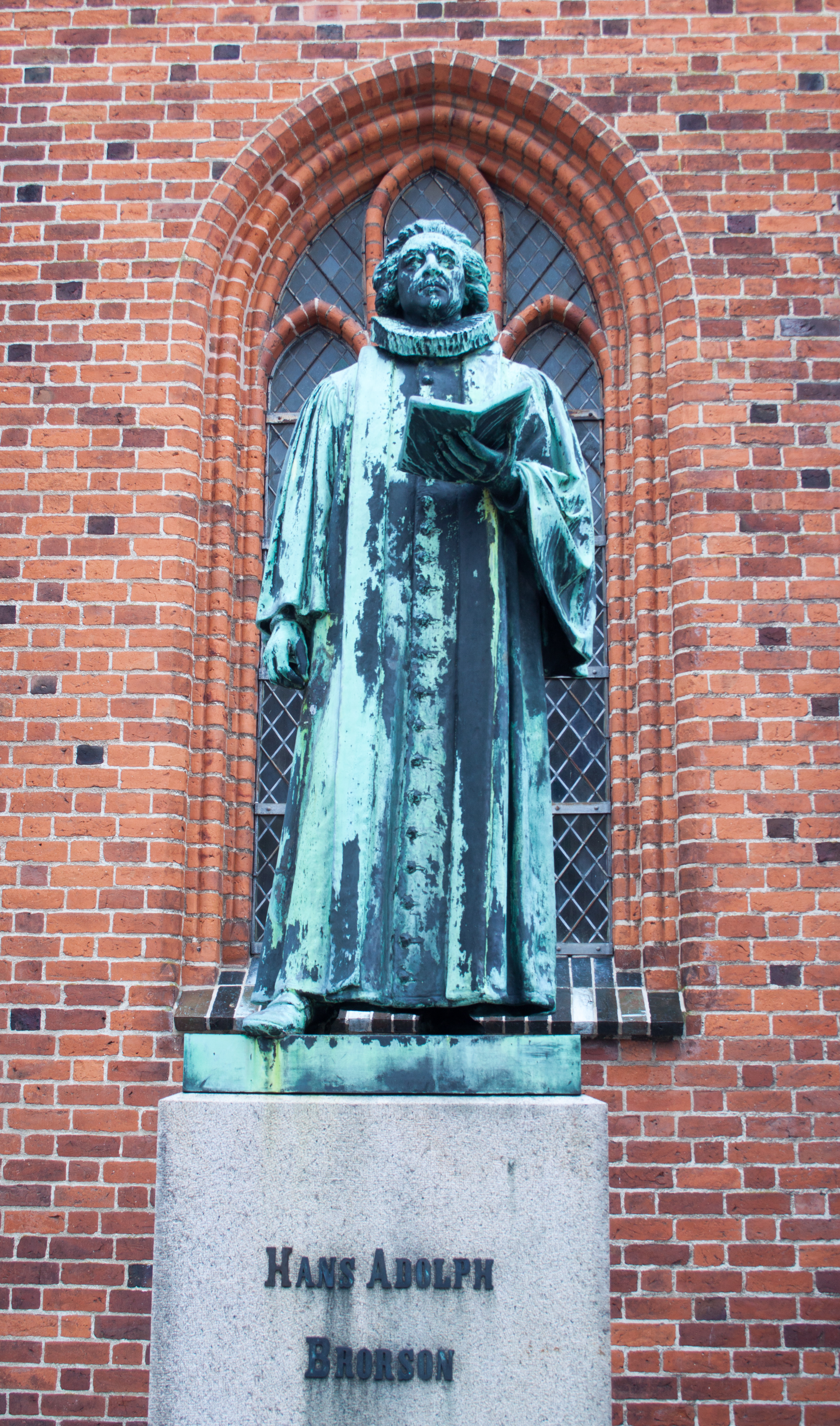
Hans Adolph Brorson bronze statue at Ribe Cathedral

Hans Adolph Brorson (20 June 1694 – 3 June 1764) was a Danish pietist clergyman, hymn write and translator of German language hymns. He served as Bishop of the Diocese of Ribe.

== Biography ==
Brorson was born at the vicarage at Randerup in Tønder municipality, Denmark. He belonged to a clerical family: his father Broder Brodersen was a parish priest in Randerup, both of this brothers were vicars. In 1712 he graduated from Ribe Cathedral School. From 1712 to 1716 Brorson studied theology at the University of Copenhagen. Brorson was appointed rector of Holstebro in 1721. In 1729, he became deacon in Tønder. In 1737, Broder was called to be Bishop at Aalborg. In 1741 he became Bishop of the Diocese of Ribe where he remained the rest of his life. He died during 1764 and was buried in Ribe Cathedral.

He began publishing hymns in 1732 while a pastor in southern Jutland. His most important work was Troens rare klenodie (1739; "The Rare Jewel of the Faith"), which contained many translations of German Pietist hymns and 82 original pieces and went through seven editions in Brorson's lifetime. His outward social success as a clerical administrator was contrasted by private sorrows (an insane son, the early death of his first wife) but he resigned himself to his fate. Some of these problems are probably reflected in a second book of hymns, Svanesang ("Swan Song"), that was published posthumously in 1765. From this collection must be mentioned the still popular and hopeful funeral hymn Her vil ties ("Here will be silent")

Almost forgotten after his death but "re-detected" during the romantic period Brorson is now ranked among the four greatest Danish hymn writers. His tune is not as strong as that of Kingo but in return he is more of a lyricist. Besides he is perhaps the first important Southern Jutland poet in Danish literature. The Christmas hymn Den yndigste rose er funden (1732) is included in the Danish Culture Canon. Brorson's lyrics formed the basis of the first two of Edvard Grieg's Fire Salmer, 'Guds søn har gjort mig fri' ('God's son has set me free') and 'Hvad est du dog skjøn' ('O but you are beautiful').

== Selected list of works ==
Songs

- "The Rare Jewel of the Faith"
- "Behold a Host, Arrayed in White (Den Store Hvide Flok)"
- "Here will be silent"
- "My Heart Always Wanders"
- "I Walk in Danger All the Way"
- "Now found is the Fairest of Roses" (Den yndigste rose er funden)
- "no:Her kommer dine arme små" ("Thy Little Ones, Dear Lord are We")

== Other sources ==
- Egil Elseth (1985) Hans Adolph Brorson. Pietisten og Poeten (Oslo: Forlag Verbum) ISBN 9788254302804
