= St. Catherine's Priory, Ribe =

Coordinates: 55°19′38″N 8°45′54″E

St. Catherine's Priory
- Sankt Katharine Kirke
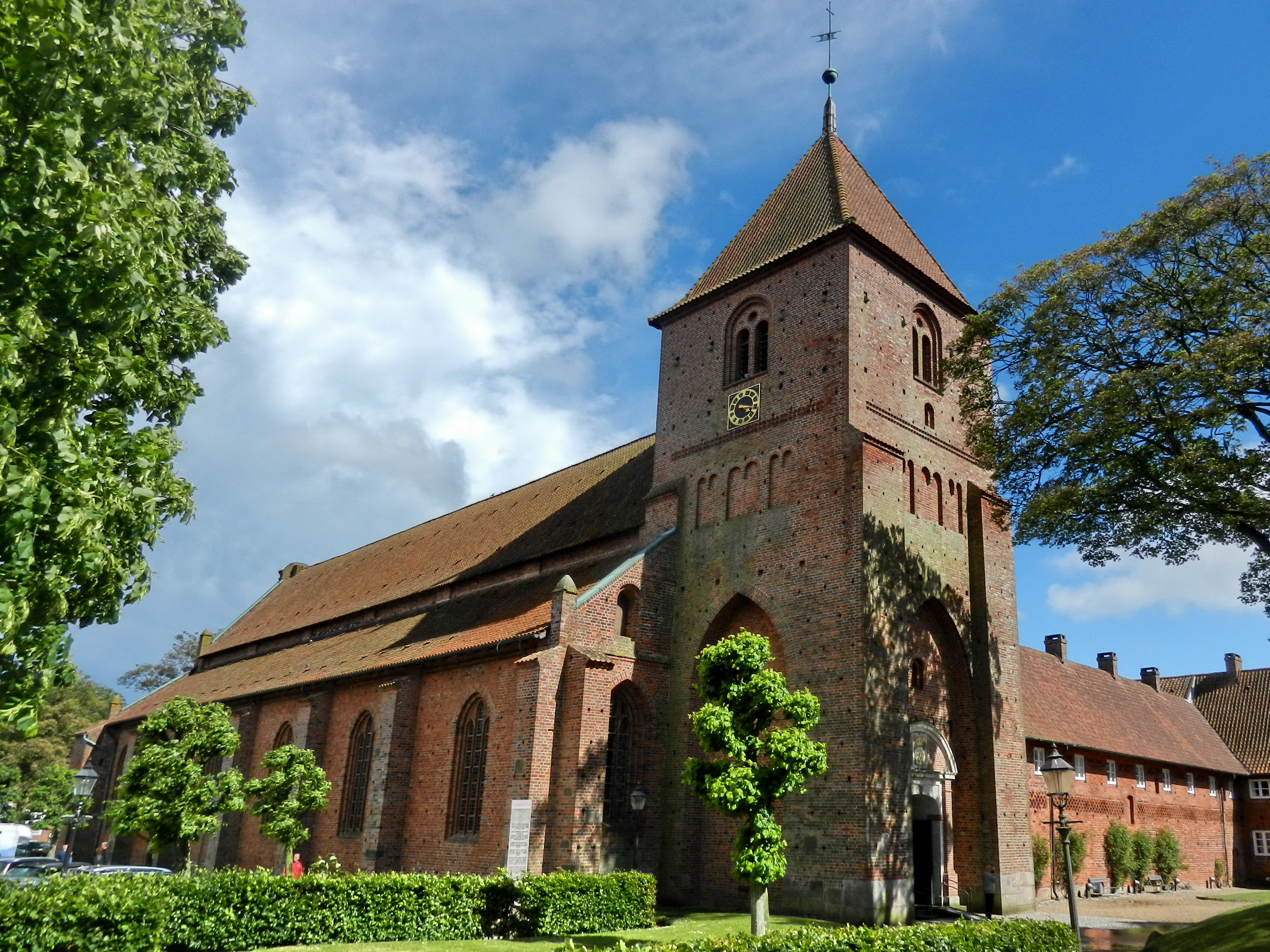
- St. Catherine's Priory
- Location: Ribe, Denmark
- Website: www.sct-catharinae.dk

History
- Former name(s): Sankt Katharine Kloster; Ribe Kloster

Architecture
- Architectural type: Romanesque architecture
- Completed: c. 1450

Administration
- Diocese: Diocese of Ribe
- Parish: Sankt Katharine Sogn

St. Catherine's Priory (Danish: Sankt Kathrine Kirke or Sankt Kathrine Kloster) was an important early Dominican friary, located in Ribe, Denmark from 1228 until 1536. The buildings still stand, although there is no monastic community there. Known as Ribe Kloster, it is Denmark's most complete extant monastic building complex.

== History ==
The Dominican priory in Ribe, dedicated to Saint Catherine of Siena, was founded in 1228 by Dominican friars on property given to them by Tuve, Bishop of Ribe, only the second such foundation in Denmark. The church, dedicated to Saint Catherine, was built in Romanesque style with a simple nave and chancel of brick. They also built an attached conventual building.

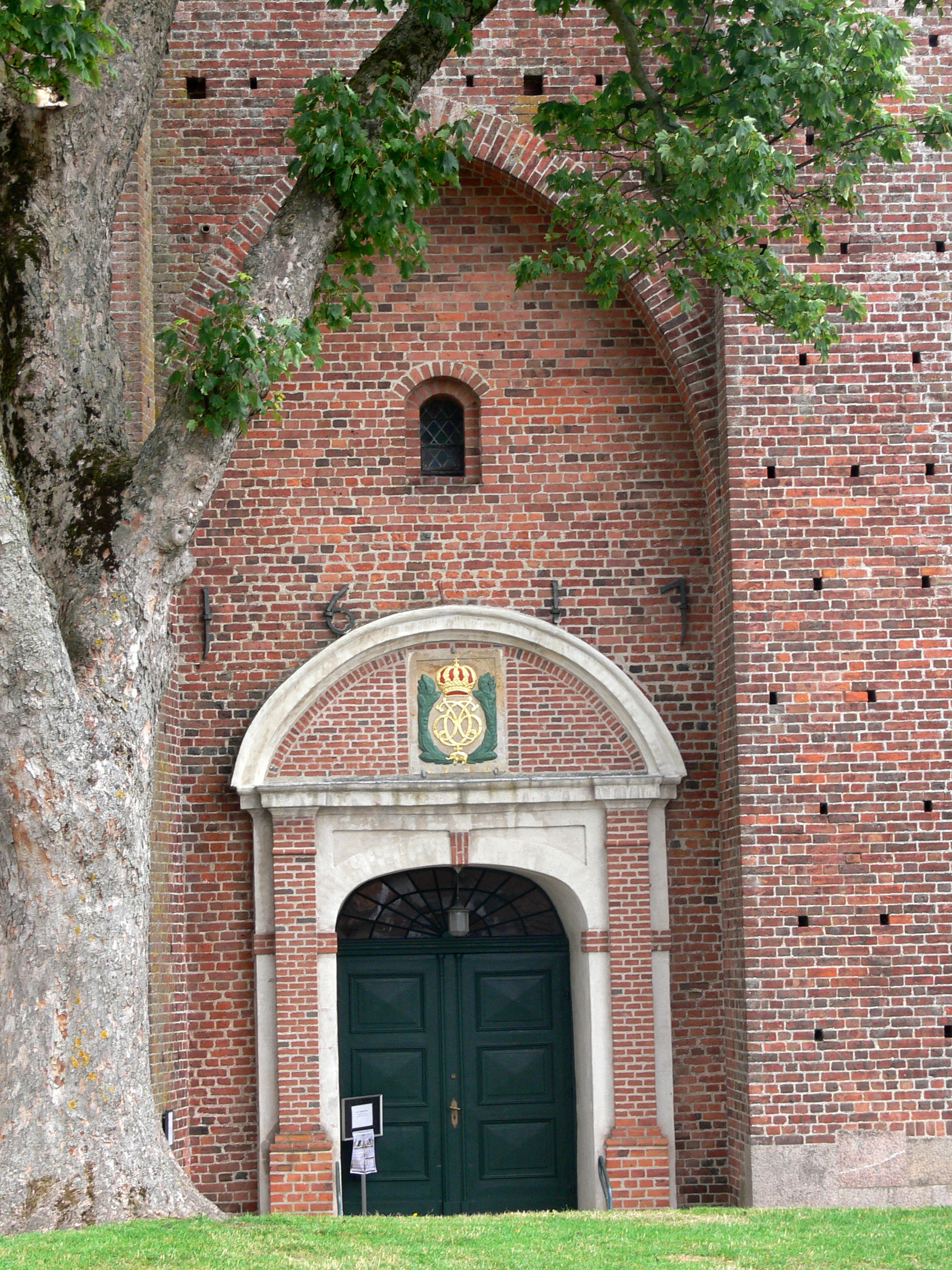
Main entrance to St. Catherine's church, formerly the Dominican priory church

By 1246 the priory was substantial enough for the provincial meeting of the order to be held there. As Ribe became Denmark's largest and most prosperous town, the priory was reconstructed and expanded in the early 14th century with a larger towerless church and a quadrangular set of buildings providing the friars with privacy from the rest of the community. The new construction was in the Gothic style. A large cellar was built beneath the south range.

In the late 14th century the priory was sacked along with rest of Ribe: a papal letter enjoined the community and monks to reconstruct it.

The Dominicans were primarily missionaries who vowed to be chaste, obedient, and poor, and were established in towns where they or their representatives could go out and beg their daily bread from local residents. Their rule forbade them to own anything individually, but over the years individuals and families gave income-producing properties to support the community. The Dominicans also accepted gifts for the privilege of burying family members inside the priory church.

Construction continued through the 15th century as the church was expanded to three aisles and the ranges lengthened to their present size. Then fire ravaged part of the buildings and reconstruction was encouraged by the pope himself. Christian I gave a substantial amount of money to the priory in 1480. A covered cloister was built, and several outbuildings were constructed nearby.

== Dissolution ==
By the late 1520s many Danes wanted an end to the many tithes, fees, rents, forced work, and endless requests for food, clothing, and money by the Catholic Church. Their anger was first vented on what they nicknamed the "beggar monks" (Danish: tiggermunke), the Franciscan and Dominican friars. In Ribe the Franciscans were ejected first, then the Dominicans were expelled from the priory; some become laymen and remained in Denmark, while others left the country for Dominican houses in central Europe.

Denmark became a Lutheran state in 1536 in the Reformation. All religious houses and their income properties reverted to the crown. The priory church was converted for use as Ribe's second parish church, which it remains, still called St. Catherine's. The other monastic and religious communities in Ribe were all closed.

The Dominican priory was converted for use as the city hospital in 1543 by order of Christian III for the care of the sick, poor and weak, and remained so for many years. In about 1600 part of the former conventual buildings was turned into the cathedral school. In the 18th century the eastern range began to fall down and was demolished. Part of the hospital was used as a lunatic asylum until 1860.

By 1825 the buildings were in need of serious repair and an extensive restoration was conducted to preserve them. In 1865 the entire hospital was converted into apartments for the elderly poor. In 1918 the entire complex was restored once again to what architects believed was the original appearance. The church restoration to its Gothic origins was finally complete and a tower added for the first time.

The buildings, known as Ribe Kloster, situated in a park, remain a prominent feature of central Ribe.

== Images ==
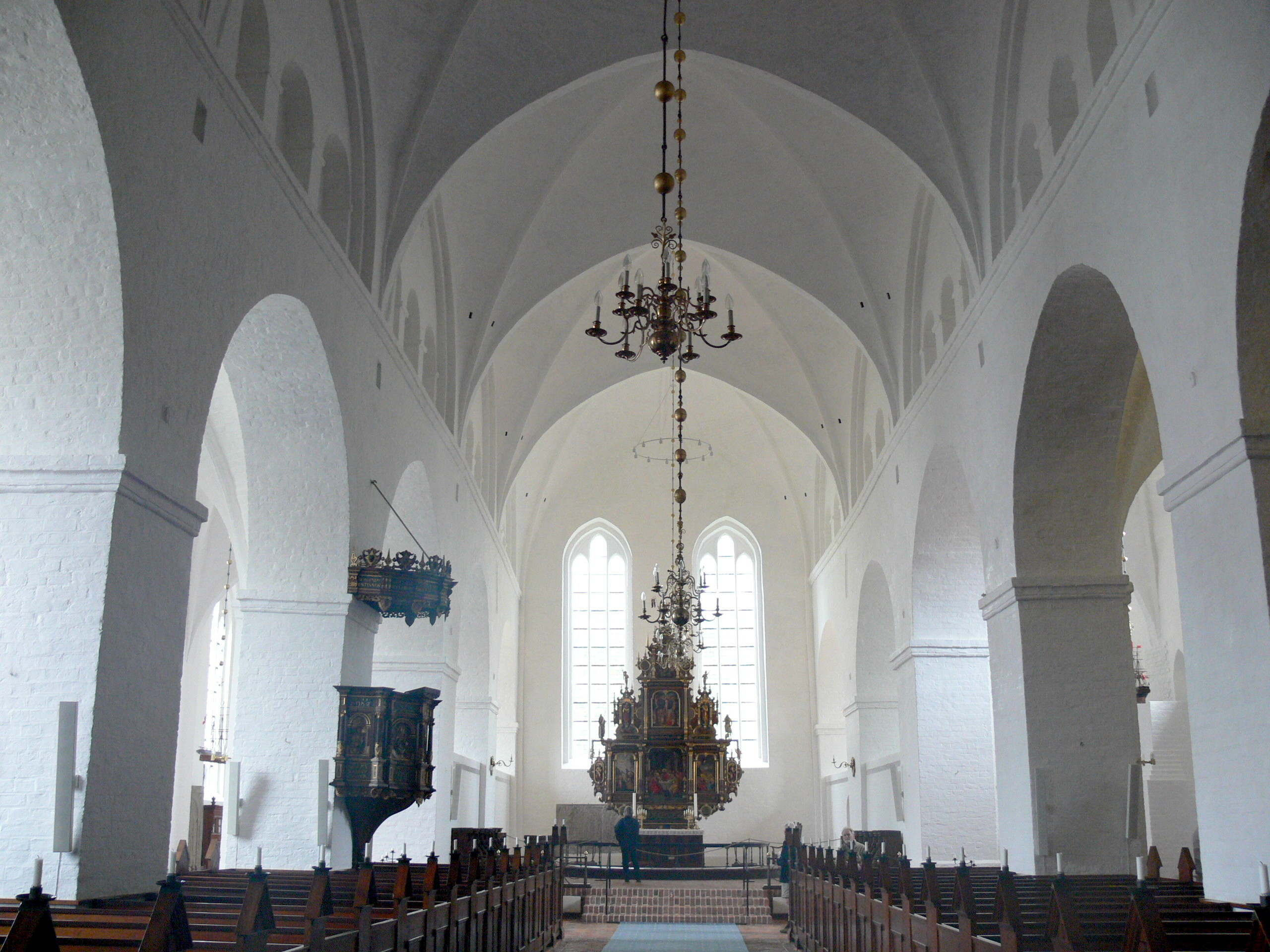
Church interior

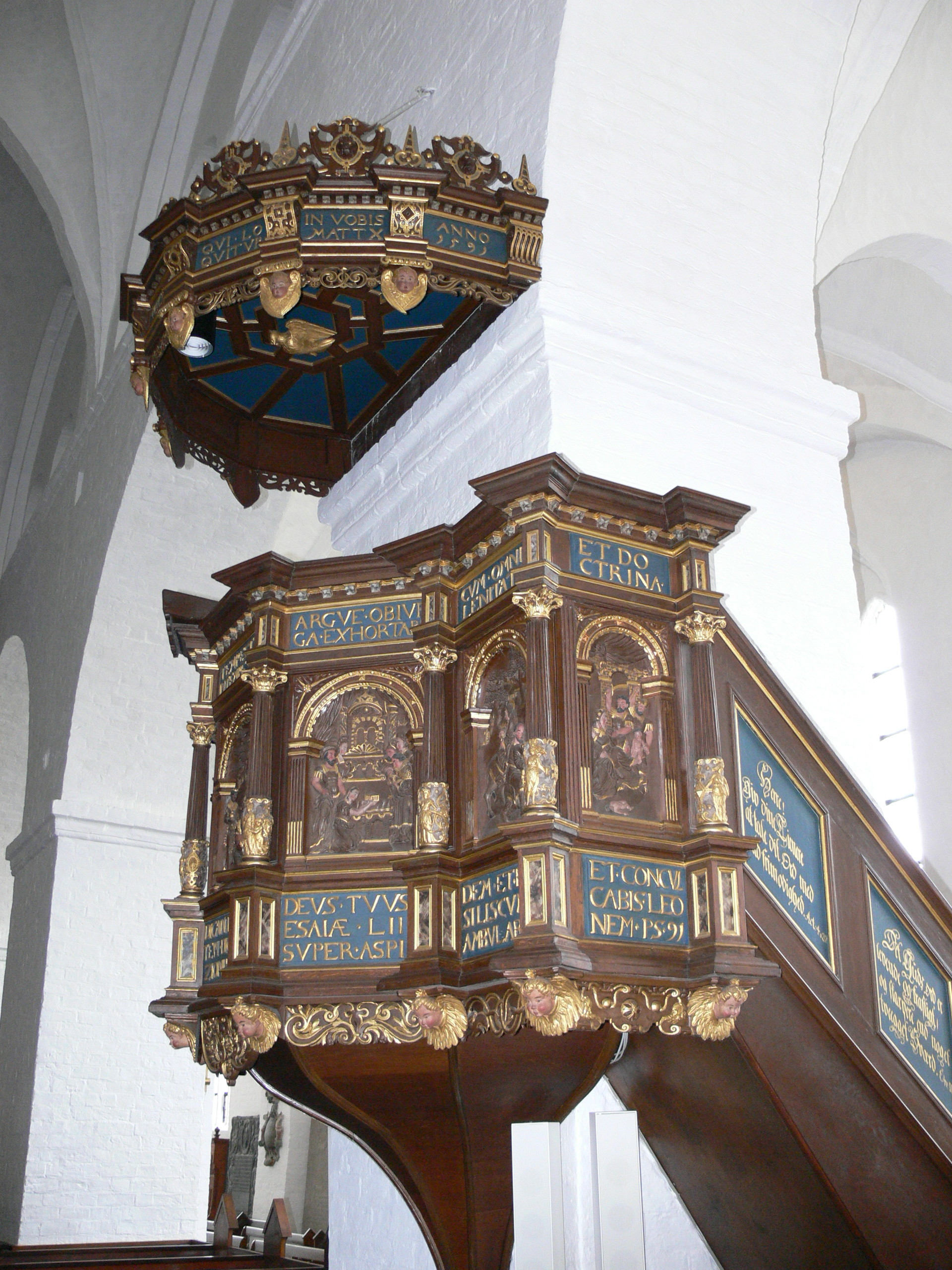
Renaissance pulpit

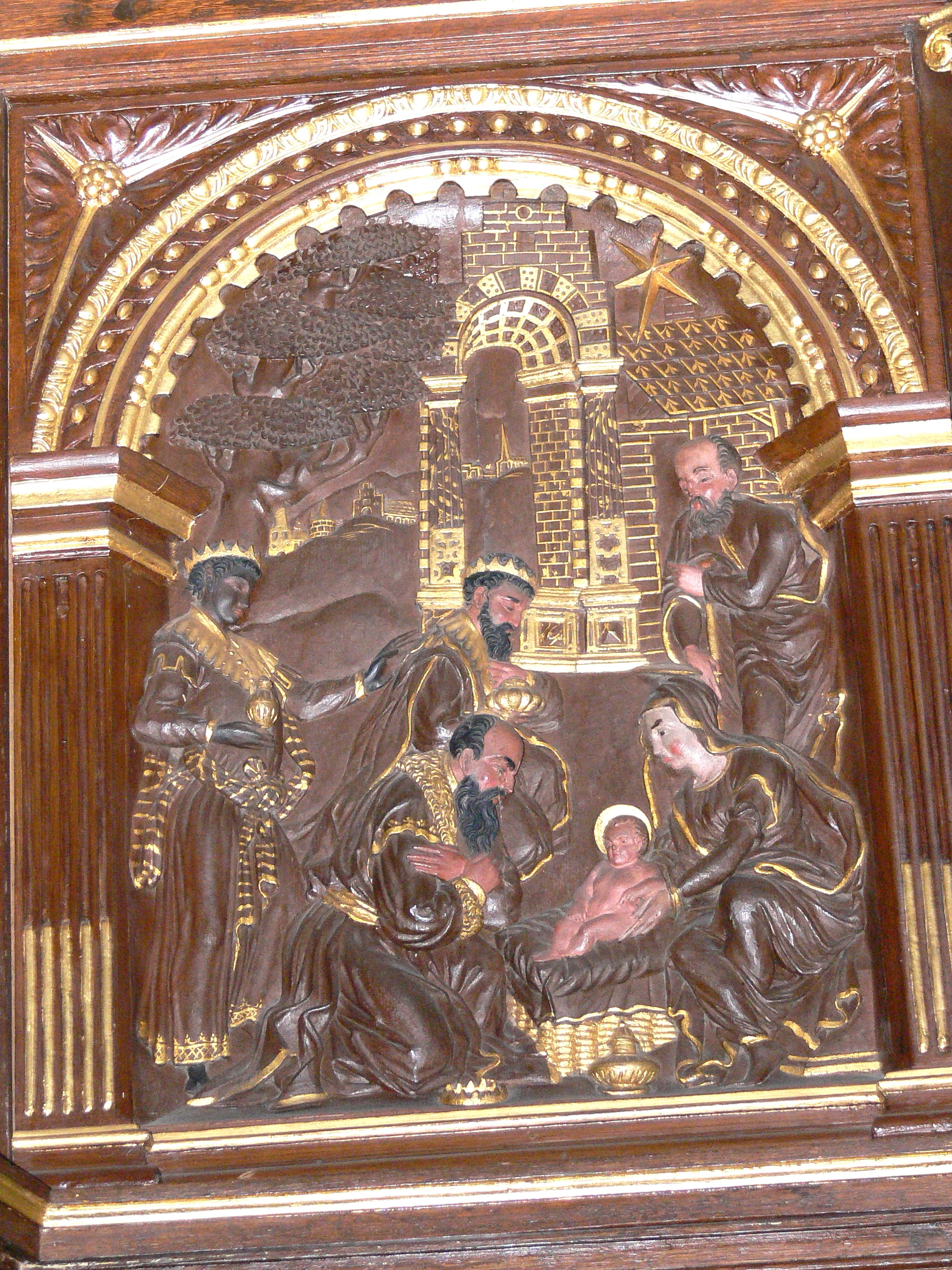
Pulpit detail: Adoration of the Magi

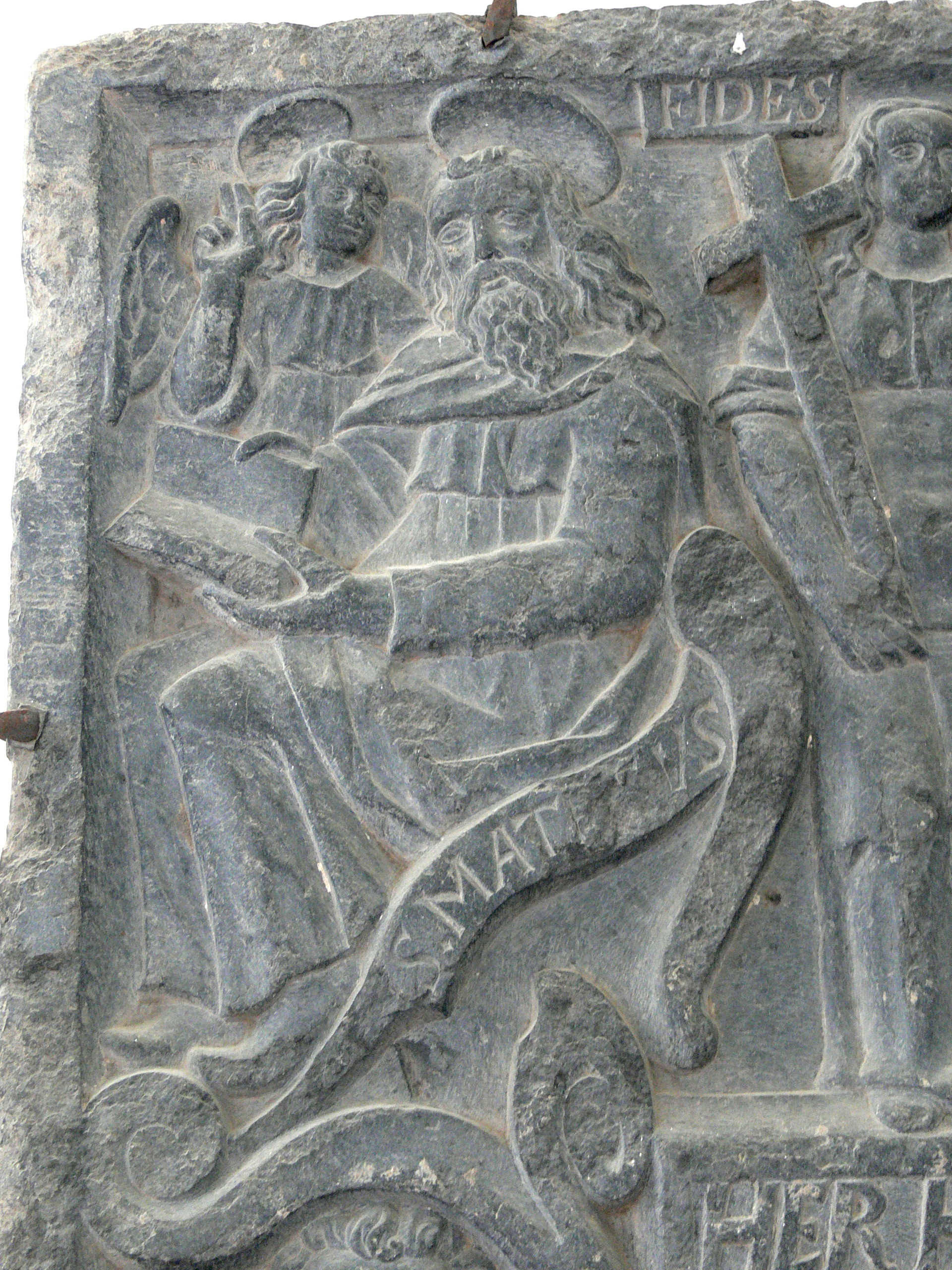
Monument detail (1)

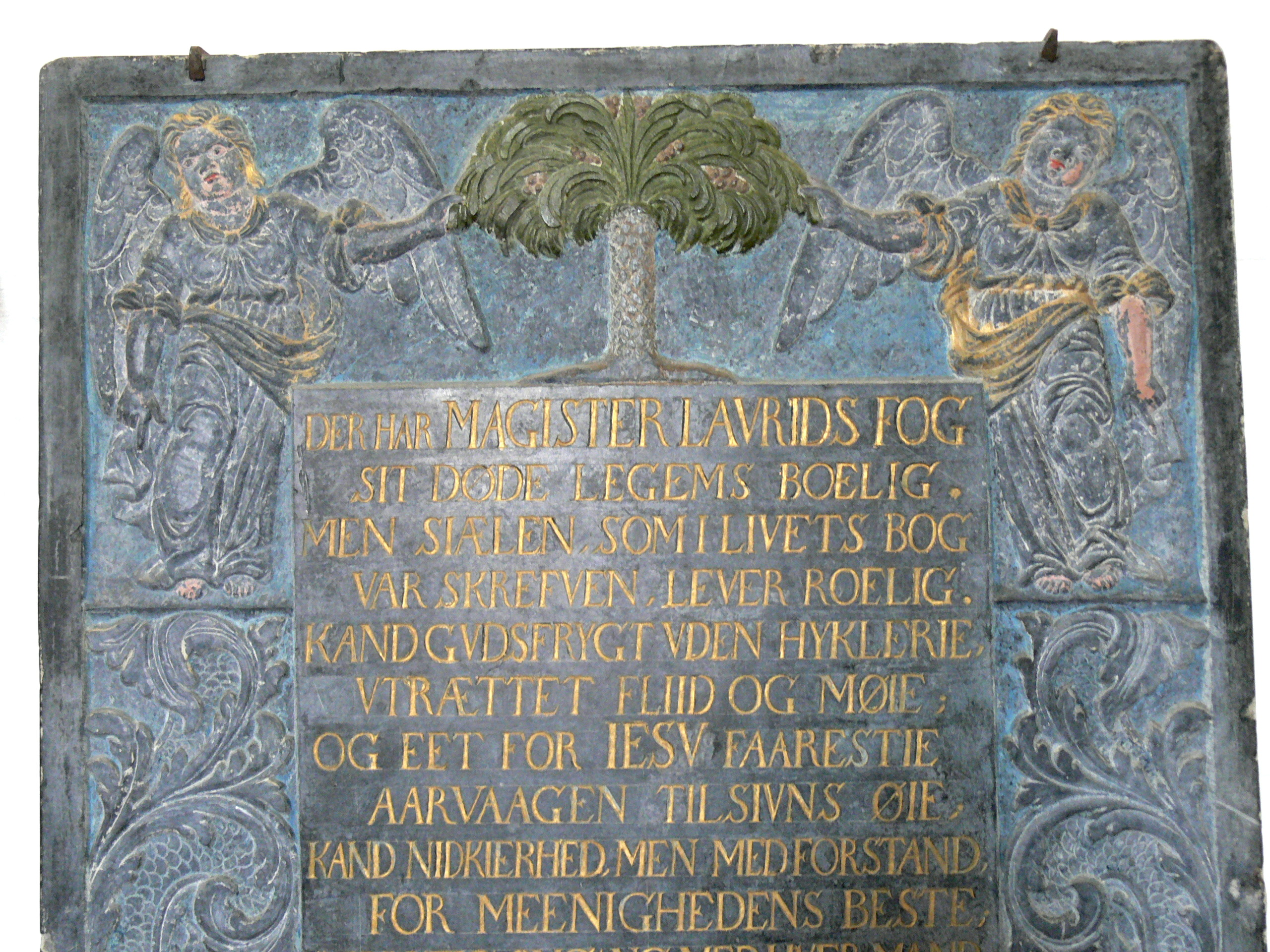
Monument detail (2)

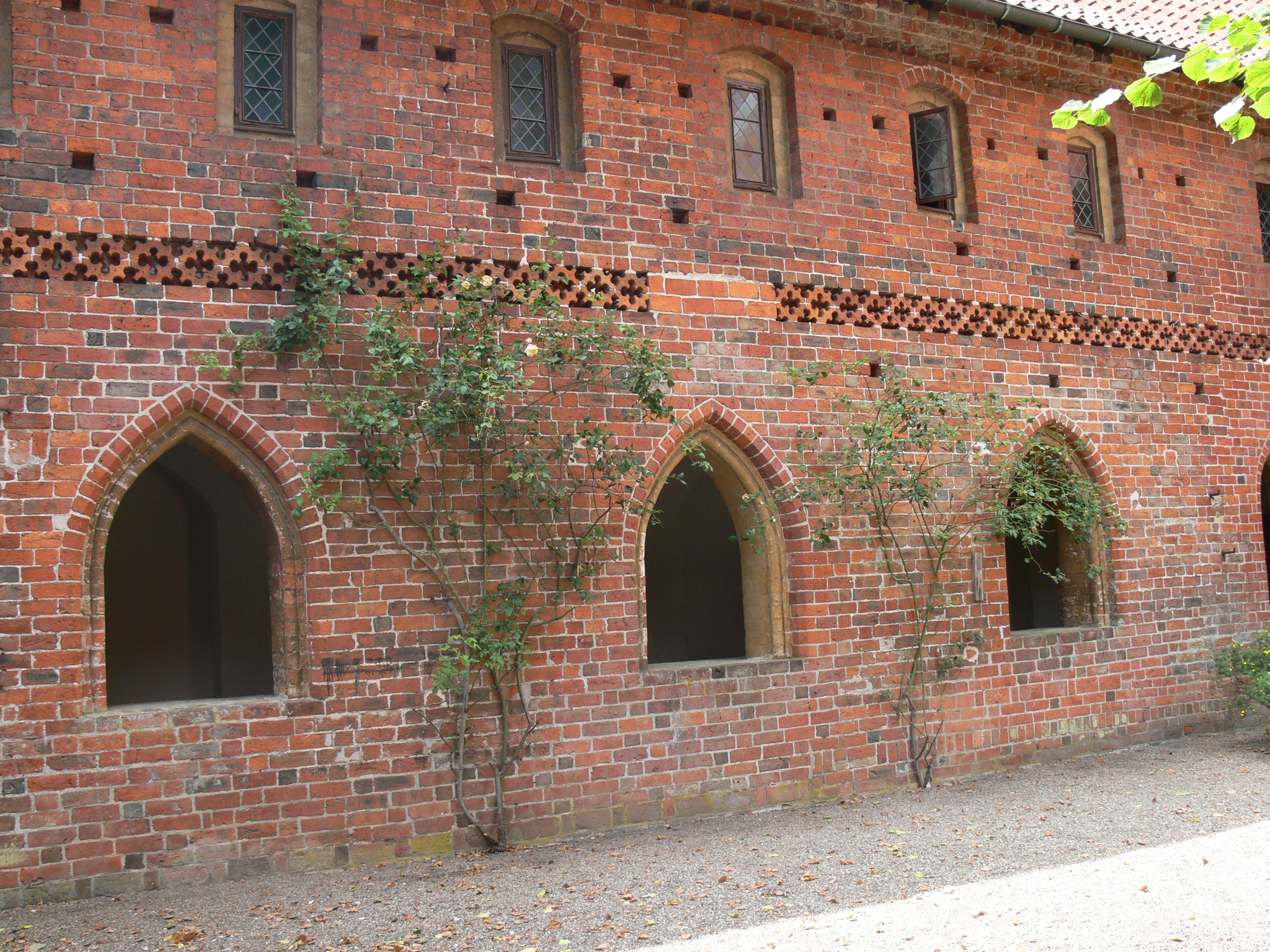
Priory cloisters

== Sources and external links ==
- Ribe Kloster website (in Danish)
- Græbe, Henrik, 1978: Ribe Sanct Katharinæ Kloster Sognekirke og Hospital
