= Roskilde Jars =

Danish artifact

Coordinates: 55°38′24″N 12°05′19″E

- Artist: Peter Brandes
- Location: Roskilde on the Danish island of Zealand

The Roskilde Jars (Danish: Roskildekrukkerne) stand on the square outside the railway station in Roskilde on the Danish island of Zealand. The three huge jars are 5 m (16 ft) in height and together weigh about 24 tons.

The jars are the work of the Danish abstract sculptor Peter Brandes (1944–2025). They were commissioned by Elsebeth Stryhn of Stryhns Leverpostej, a local meat paste company, and presented to the city in 1998 on the occasion of Roskilde's 1,000th anniversary.

The jars stand in a shallow basin of water, in which they are reflected. The one closest to the station is inscribed with extracts from Henrik Nordbrandt's poem Junker Kristoffer, a local hero buried in Roskilde Cathedral in 1363. The colourful glazed jars (two in tones of blue, the third in bronze) are reminiscent of Ancient Greek amphoras. They have accounted for several world records in pottery manufacture. Consisting of several hundred sections fired up to 1,300 °C at the Tommerup ceramics factory on the island of Funen, they were assembled by two men who stacked the sections on top of each other.

== See also ==
- List of public art in Roskilde Municipality
