= Ribe Cathedral =

- The Cathedral Church of Our Lady
- Vor Frue Maria Domkirke
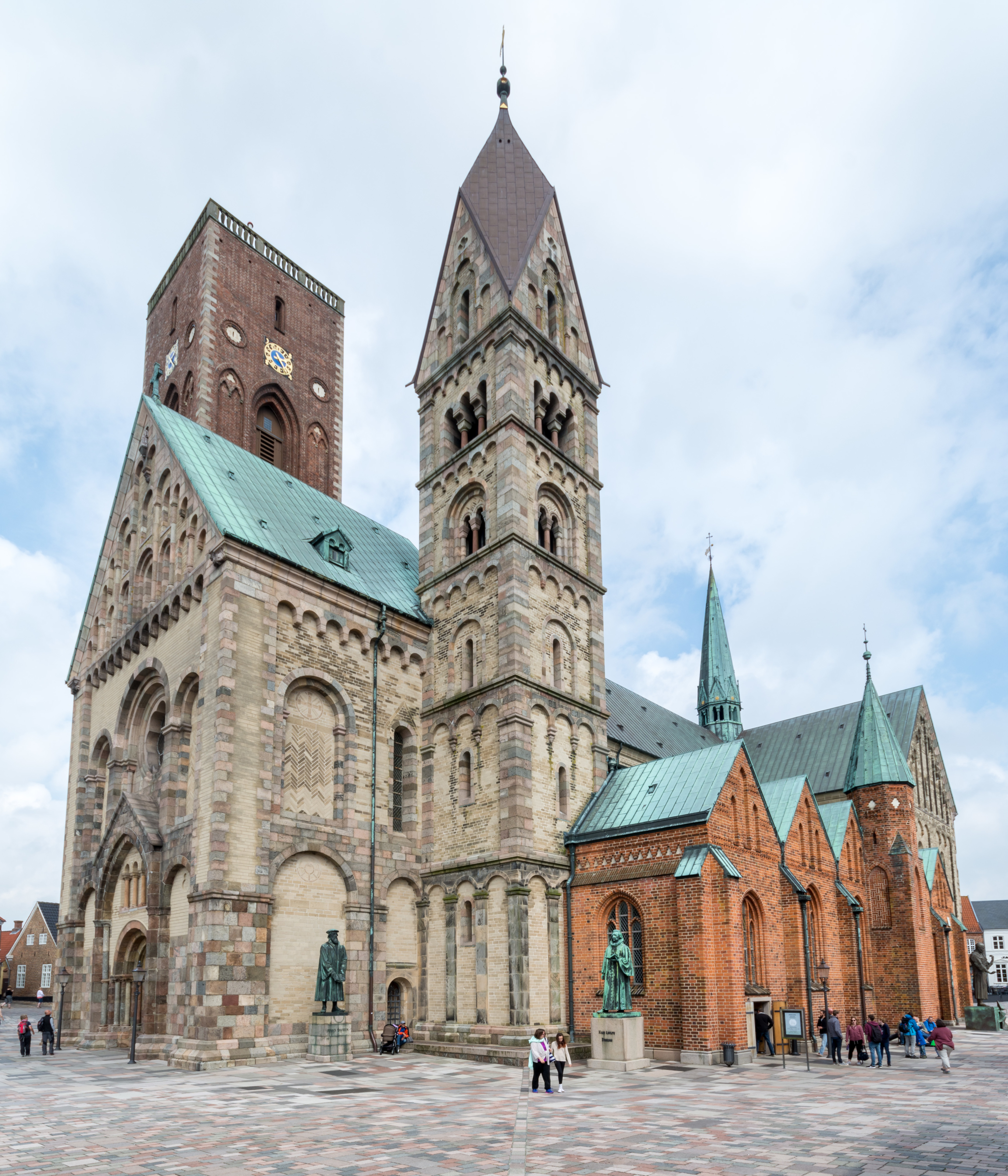
- Ribe Cathedral. Because of its long and troubled history, the building reflects a plethora of different architectural styles and artistic traditions.
- Ribe Cathedral
- 55.3281°N 8.7613°E
- Location: Ribe
- Country: Denmark
- Denomination: Church of Denmark
- Previous denomination: Roman Catholic
- Website: Website of the Basilica

History
- Status: Active
- Founded: 860
- Founder: Ansgar
- Dedication: Virgin Mary

Architecture
- Functional status: Cathedral church
- Years built: 1150-1250
- Groundbreaking: 1150

Administration
- Diocese: Ribe

Clergy
- Bishop: Elof Westergaard
- Dean: Jens Torkild Bak

Ribe Cathedral or Our Lady Maria Cathedral (Danish: Ribe Domkirke or Vor Frue Maria Domkirke) is located in the ancient city of Ribe, on the west coast of southern Jutland, Denmark. It was founded in the Viking Age as the first Christian church in Denmark by Ansgar, a missionary monk from Hamburg, under permission of the pagan King Horik I. The cathedral has experienced several damaging events throughout its long history and has been restored, expanded and decorated repeatedly. As it stands today, Ribe Cathedral is the best preserved Romanesque building in Denmark, but reflects a plethora of different architectural styles and artistic traditions. It ranks among the most popular tourist attractions in Denmark and has been awarded two stars in the Michelin guide.

== History ==
Ribe is Denmark's oldest surviving city. Ribe began as an open trading market on the north bank of the Ribe River where it runs into the North Sea. Danes, Norwegians, Swedes, Germans, Frisians, English and other cultures occasionally brought exchange goods here from all parts of northwestern Europe. The landscape around Ribe is flat, wind-blown and sandy, without any particular natural harbour, but in former times, boats could enter the river from the sea and reach the town. By the late Medieval period, the natural sedimentation processes of the Wadden Sea had closed that option. Ribe Market was sanctioned by either King Angantyr (Ongendus) or King Harald Hildetand as early as 705. In the Viking Age, Ribe was a bustling international trade center, making it an ideal starting point for Christian missionaries from Hamburg to initiate the process of the Christianization of Scandinavia.

Harald Klak, king in Jutland, was forced in to exile by his King, Horik I and fled to Germany to get help from Louis the Pious, King of the Franks. Louis the Pious put off Harald's request and offered him the Dukedom of Frisia as a consolation prize, if he would become Christian. Harald agreed and was baptized along with his wife, family and "four hundred Danes" in his company. Harald returned to Denmark in 826 in an attempt to reclaim his former lands and brought the missionary monk Ansgar with him in order to continue the Christianization of the Danes. Harald's quarrelsome nature soon asserted itself and he fled back to Frisia and Ansgar was forced to leave Denmark.

The first church in Ribe was founded in 860 by Ansgar, who later became Archbishop of Hamburg. It was a timber church, built with the permission of King Horik I on the south side of the river, across the market. Ansgar won the confidence of the king, who had burned Hamburg in 845, Ansgar's home town. But the Danes in Hedeby and Ribe soon complained about the church bells, which they feared might scare away the land sprites (Danish: landvætter). So in reaction to the increased success of Ansgar and his companions, Young King Horik II closed the church in Hedeby. Eventually Ansgar also won Horik the Younger's friendship, and the church was later reopened.

St. Rimbert (ca. 830–888) who succeeded Ansgar, died in 888. Following his death, the mission to the Danes collapsed, the missionaries moved on, and the church was burned down to eradicate any memory of the "foreign" religion.

Ribe was established as a diocese for St. Leofdag, the first Bishop of Ribe, in 948 under the supervision of the Archbishop of Hamburg, who was authorized by the Roman Curia to proselytize the Danes. Leofdag was murdered that same year, when a housecarl skewered him with a spear, as he forded the river at Ribe. Although never canonized, Leofdag was revered as a local saint, until the Reformation. His remains would eventually end up in Ribe Cathedral.

The first stone cathedral, was begun by Bishop Thur in 1110 and stood completed in 1134. Tufa stone was imported from Germany to build the permanent structure, as stone was a scarce resource around Ribe. The cathedral was built in the Romanesque style, with half-rounded arches supporting a flat timber ceiling, a typical basilica style building, patterned after churches in northern Germany.

King Erik II of Denmark (Danish:Erik Emune) was murdered at the Urnehoved Assembly (Danish: Ting) in July 1137 by Chief Sorte Plov in revenge for the execution of a relative. The king was buried inside the cathedral. King Erik's three-year reign, was a short pause in the unrelenting competition for the throne of Denmark. King Erik earned the nickname "Bloody Erik" for his execution of his own brother Harald and ten (or eleven) of Harald's twelve sons. Later historians have nevertheless called him "Erik Who ought to be Remembered" (Danish: Emune) in their writings. The royal burial enhanced the Cathedral's reputation.

The Cathedral school and chapter, were founded by Bishop Elias in 1145. He also saw the cathedral's completion and consecration.

A terrible fire in 1176, ravaged the town and the new cathedral. Because it was not completely destroyed, Ribe Cathedral stands as Denmark's best preserved Romanesque building today. The remains of the old church was repaired and extended with new constructions in large red bricks - a new building material for the time. The church was enlarged, so that the nave was flanked by double aisles on each side. In parts of the church, the old flat ceilings, were raised and Gothic vaulting installed.

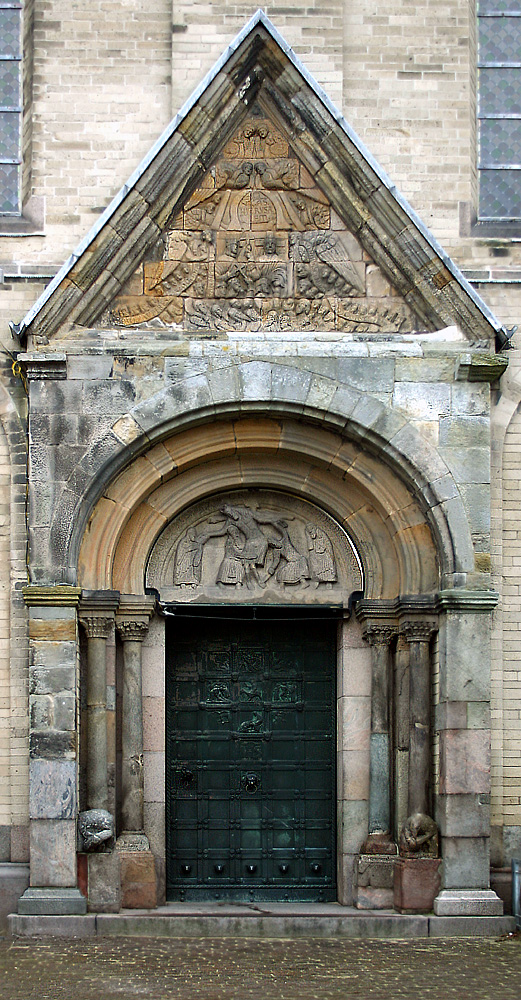
Cat's head portal from the late 12th century

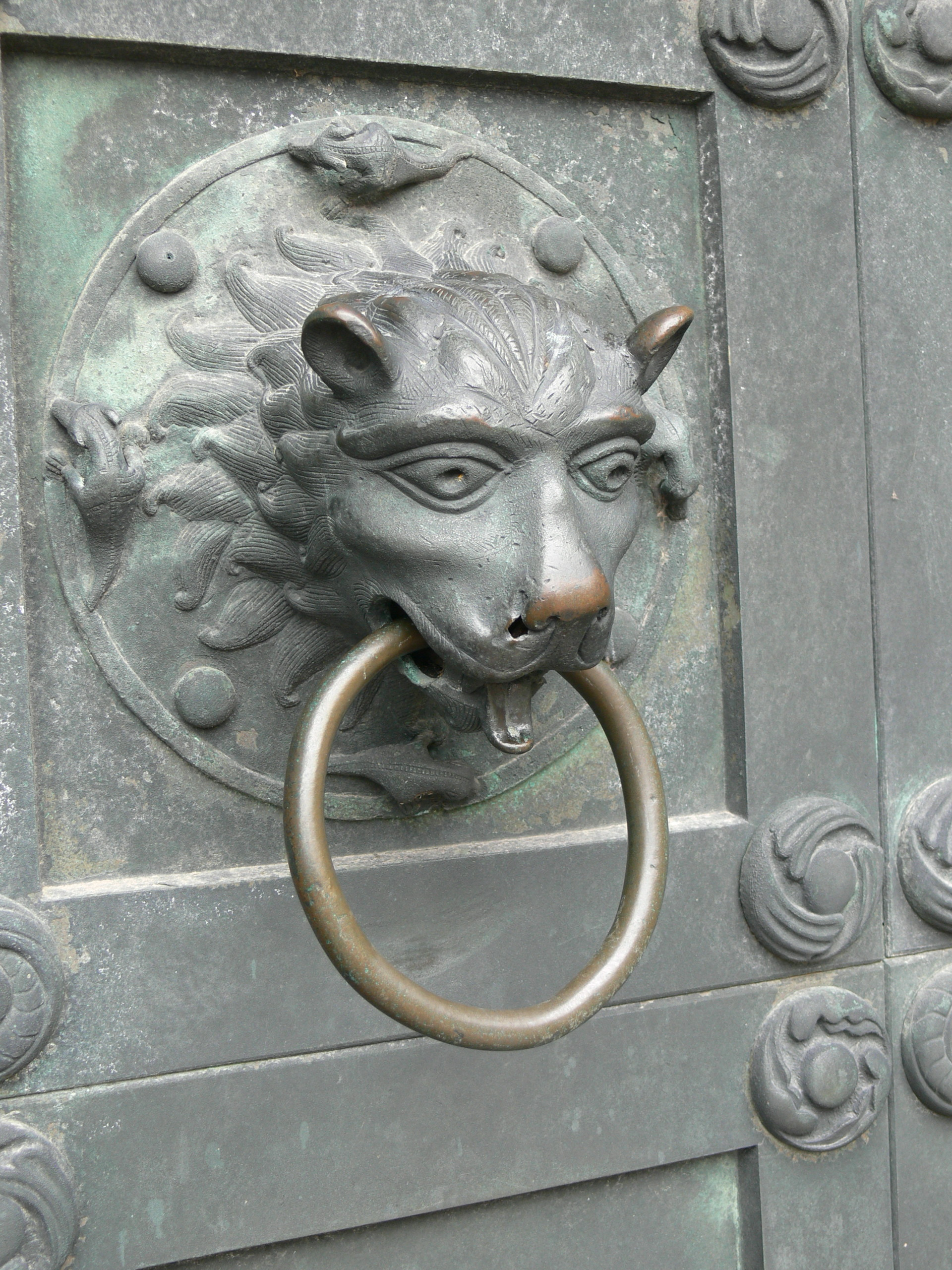
Doorknocker by Anne Marie Carl-Nielsen

Late in the 12th century, a magnificent main door way was carved for the cathedral. The relief above the door shows Jesus being taken down from the cross. About 50 years earlier, a triangular relief showing the Day of Judgement was placed above the main door. The door is called "the cat's head portal", because of the two lions at the base of the two columns flanking the doorway.

The triangular relief is considered one of the largest remaining romanesque granite reliefs.

About the same time as work on restoring the cathedral was underway, the citizens of Ribe built a second wall around the town. Ribe was without question Denmark's most important trade center of the time, and the wealth that flowed to the city and the cathedral, made such costly constructions possible.

In 1259 King Christoffer I of Denmark was buried at Ribe Cathedral. King Christoffer was the son of Valdemar II and was elected King of Denmark after the death of his brother King Abel in 1282. He spent much of his energy maintaining control of the kingdom from his nephew in Schleswig. He had feud with the great churchman of his day, Jacob Erlendsøn, Archbishop of Lund. The argument came down to whether the king had rights over the church and church officials. when the archbishop refused to acknowledge Christoffer's son, Erik V. The archbishop was imprisoned and when he was released, Erlendsen fled the country. King Christoffer died suddenly on 29 May 1259 after drinking poisoned communion wine which rumor said he received from Abbot Arnfast of Ryd Abbey. He was buried in Ribe Cathedral.

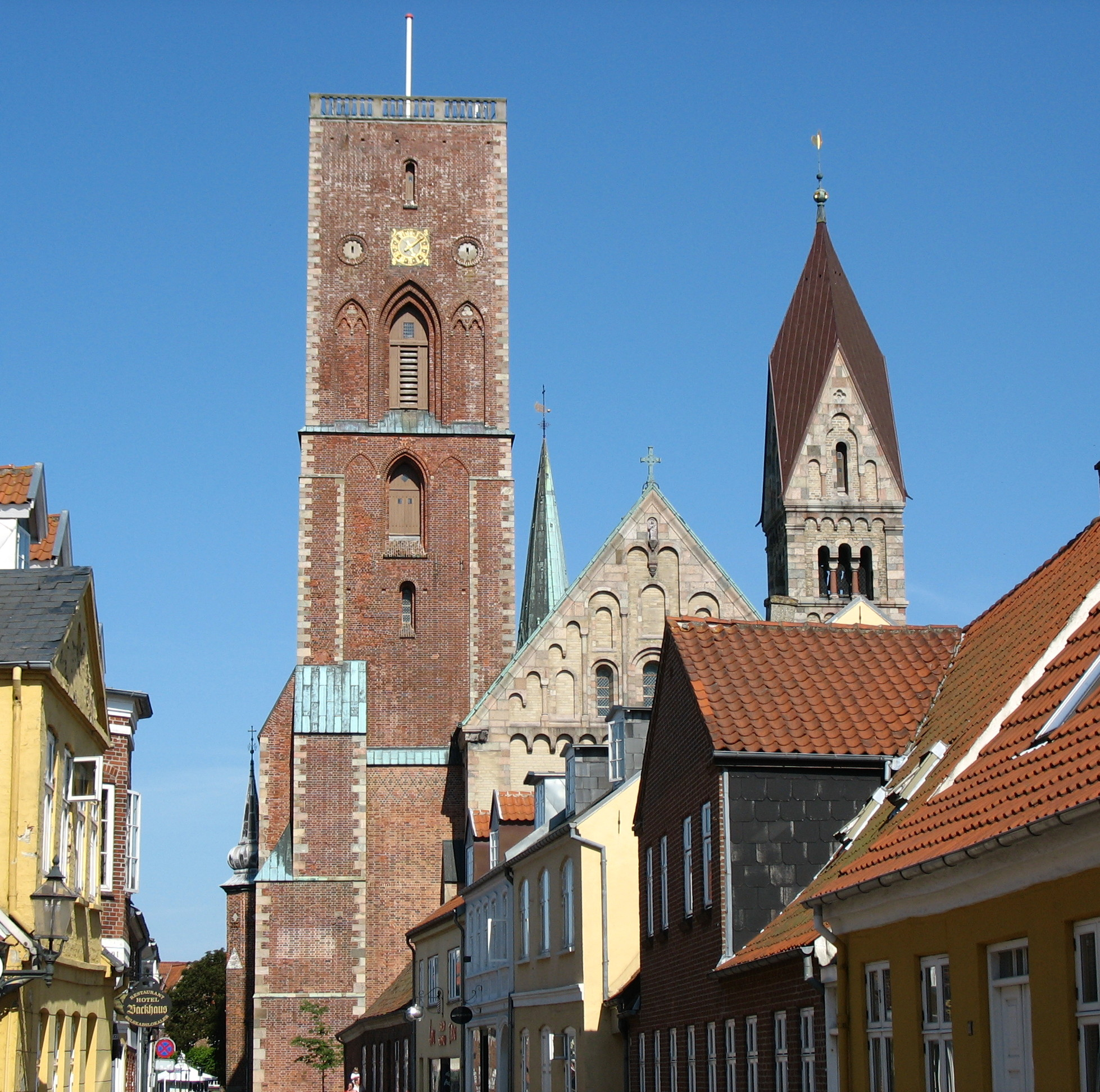
Commoner's Tower from 1333

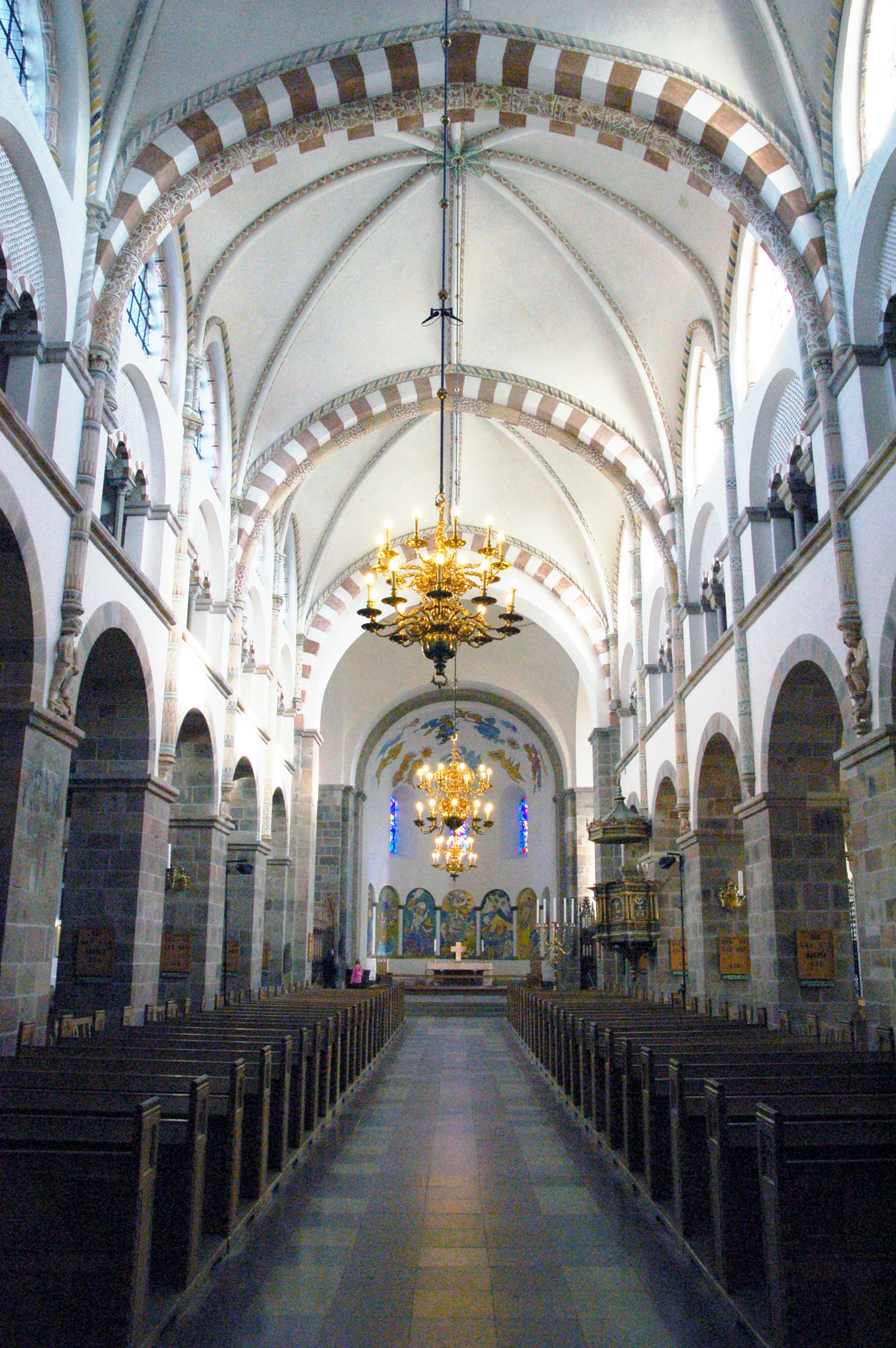
Cathedral Interior

Just before morning mass on Christmas Day 1283, the northwest tower collapsed into the church and unto the streets around the cathedral. Several people were killed. In its place, the much larger "Commoner's Tower" (Danish: Borgertårnet) was erected with the idea that it would rise much higher than the former tower. The lower parts of the new tower was occupied by the church, while the upper floors found use as an archival storage of records for the city and as a watch tower. In the Danish-Swedish Wars, eight cannons were hauled to the top to defend the city from attack. They actually fired at Swedish ships in 1644.

The Commoner's Tower was complete at 62 meters, capped by a copper "Rhenish helmet" including the narrow spire on the top in 1333.

Part of the cathedral burned in 1402 and again brick was used to restore and expand the auxiliary buildings surrounding the cathedral.

After King Eric of Pomerania was deposed in 1439, his nephew, Prince Christoffer of Bavaria, was selected to become the regent of Denmark. Once things settled down, he was elected king by the Privy Council and proclaimed King of Denmark at the Viborg Assembly 9 April 1440. He went on to be elected King of Norway and then King of Sweden. His coronation as King of Denmark took place January 1, 1443 at Ribe Cathedral.

In 1536 Denmark officially became a Lutheran nation. The cathedral was closed and the monks who had cared for and lived near the cathedral were turned out. The cathedral was subject to vandalism and neglect.

In 1542 Hans Tausen (1494–1561) becomes the Lutheran Superintendent/Bishop of Ribe until his death in 1561. His contributions to the Reformation in Denmark are commemorated by a statue of him at the base of the Maria Tower. In 1560 the last of the Roman Catholic statues, artwork, altars, and decorations are removed and the medieval paintings were plastered over.

On 3 September 1580, the town center burned to the ground, but the cathedral was spared serious damage. Most of the houses remaining in Ribe town's center date from this period.

The Commoner's Tower partially collapsed in 1594. It was rebuilt but 10 meters lower than previously, but there was no money to add any kind of spire. It remained flat-topped. Between 1595-97, the church received a new pulpit carved by sculptor, Jens Asmussen from Odense.

In 1634, a violent storm surge on the night of 11–12 October flows into Ribe and the surrounding farm land. So many people and animals died in the storm, that it was nicknamed the "Great Drowning". 8,000 people reportedly drowned during that single night. The surge flooded the cathedral as high as the pulpit. Later that year, the cathedral was gifted a new organ to replace the old one.

In 1696, a new large clock was installed in the Commoners Tower.

In 1741, one of Ribe's best remembered bishop took office, Hans Adolf Brorson (1694–1764). His name is familiar to many Danes as the creator of the first hymnbook for the Danish Lutheran Church. His collection of hymns included eighty-five of his own works. Many of them are included in the current hymnbook of the Danish National Church (Danish: Folkekirken).

In 1843, the church was restored at which time the floor was lowered by half a meter.

Between 1883-1904, the cathedral was completely restored. Each section was put back into its original style, as far as was possible.

To commemorate the restoration of 1904, three new doors including a new bronze door for the main entrance were created by artist and sculptor Anne Marie Carl-Nielsen (1863–1945).

Between 1983-1987, the apse was redecorated by COBRA artist Carl Henning Pedersen (1913–2007) . The re-decoration was a source of great controversy, even before it was carried out. This led to a public exhibition with the proposed artwork, involving both visitors and the citizens of Ribe to contribute their opinions. Half of the feedback (from 10.000 visitors) was in favor of the project and the re-decorations was eventually accepted by the local parish council and initiated. The whole incident proved to be a catalyst for a modernization of church decoration within Denmark and paved the way for artists including Mogens Jørgensen, Erik Heide, Per Kirkeby, Robert Jacobsen, Hein Heinsen, Maja Lise Engelhardt and Peter Brandes. Several books and articles revolves around the redecoration project, including a recent diary from Carl-Henning Pedersen himself from 2007 and Ribe Cathedral has issued a pamphlet on the project.

== Furnishings ==
The towers contain six bells. The oldest bell was cast in 1436 by Hinrik Dobbran. The next one was cast in 1599 by Melchior Lucas. The next one was cast in 1770 by J. N. Bieber. The next one was cast in 1847 by Jac. Fr. Beseler. The next one was cast in 1858 by P. P. Meilstrup den Ældre. The newest bell was cast in 1869 by P. P. Meilstrup den Yngre.

The organ facade is from the Johan Heide organ of 1635. Heide was a Flensburg organ maker from 1615-1641. He was an apprentice of the royal organ maker, Nicolaus, Maas. The organ has been expanded and updated many times. A new organ was built in 1973 by Frobenius and enlarged by the same company in 1994. It has 50 voices.

The main altar piece was painted by Ebbe Jehn Petersen.

The ship which hangs at the crossing is a model of the ship Marie by Captain B. Cl. Jensen of Ribe.

In the restoration of the late 19th century the walls were complete cleared of the plaster layers. Unfortunately this destroyed many rich medieval fresco paintings that enlivened the walls of the cathedral before the Reformation. A painting of the Virgin and infant Jesus has been preserved in the nave and a pillar has paintings of Apostles Andrew and Bartholomew. St. George and the Dragon have been preserved in the north transept.

Several epitaphs from the past have been preserved in the cathedral. The oldest was raised by King Valdemar for his son in 1231. In the south transept is the chapel of Admiral Albert Skeel partially in sandstone and fine wood carvings.

The epitaph for Hans Tausen hangs in the church where he is buried. His grave stone was moved next to the entrance of the Commoner's Tower.

Other important gravestones have been preserved including the one for King Christoffer I from 1259. Iver Munk, last Roman Catholic bishop of the Diocese of Ribe, can literally be seen as his grave stone is a portrait. Hans Adolph Brorson (1694–1764) Bishop of Ribe, is buried in the cathedral as well.

== Rued Langgaard ==
From 1939 to his death, the late-Romantic music composer Rued Langgaard (1893–1952) served as an organist in the cathedral. He had been unable to secure a post in Copenhagen due to the rejection of his work by the musical establishment. His then-unconventional musical compositions were at odds with that of his contemporaries and were not commonly recognized until after his death.

== Gallery ==
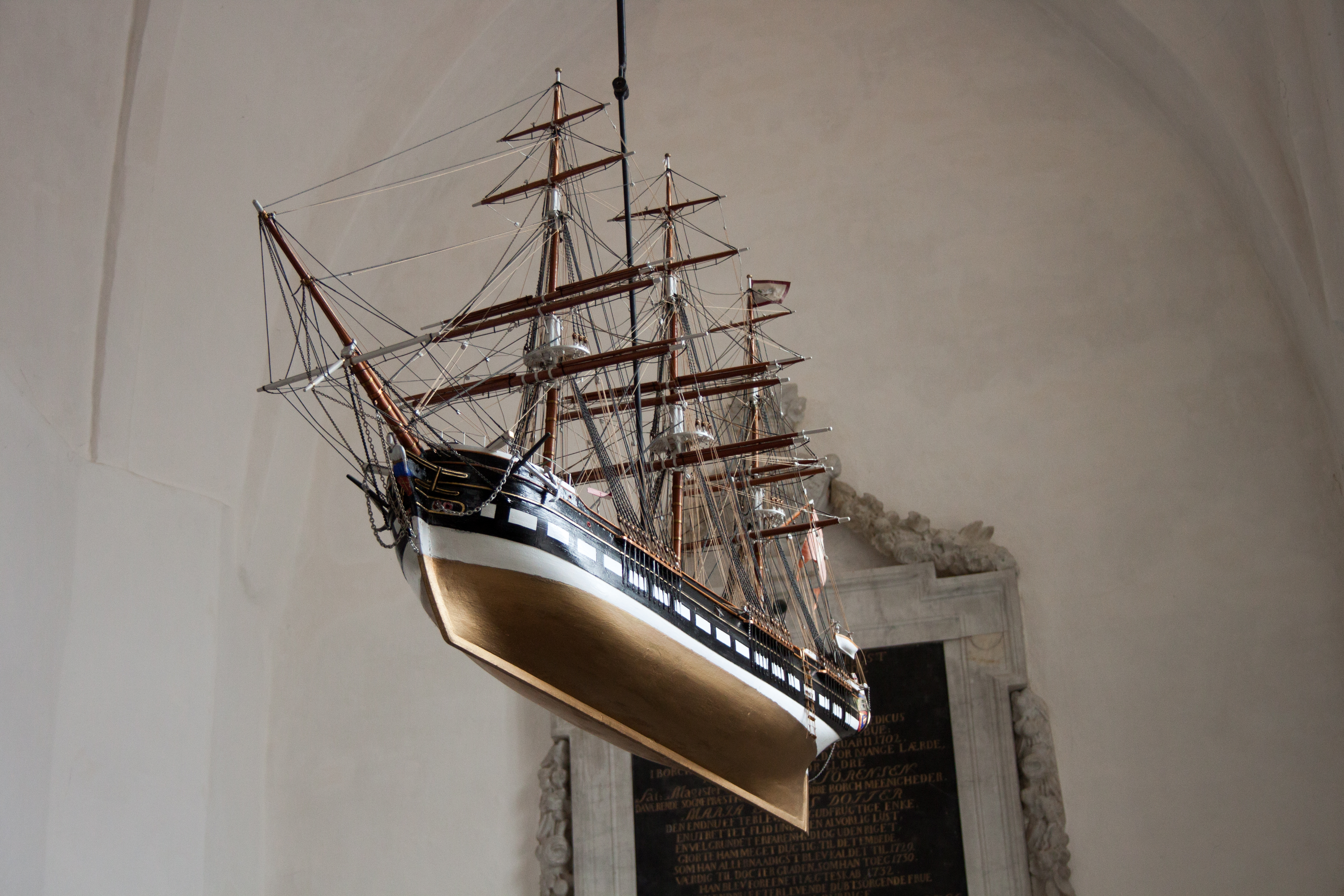
Ship model by Captain B. Cl. Jensen

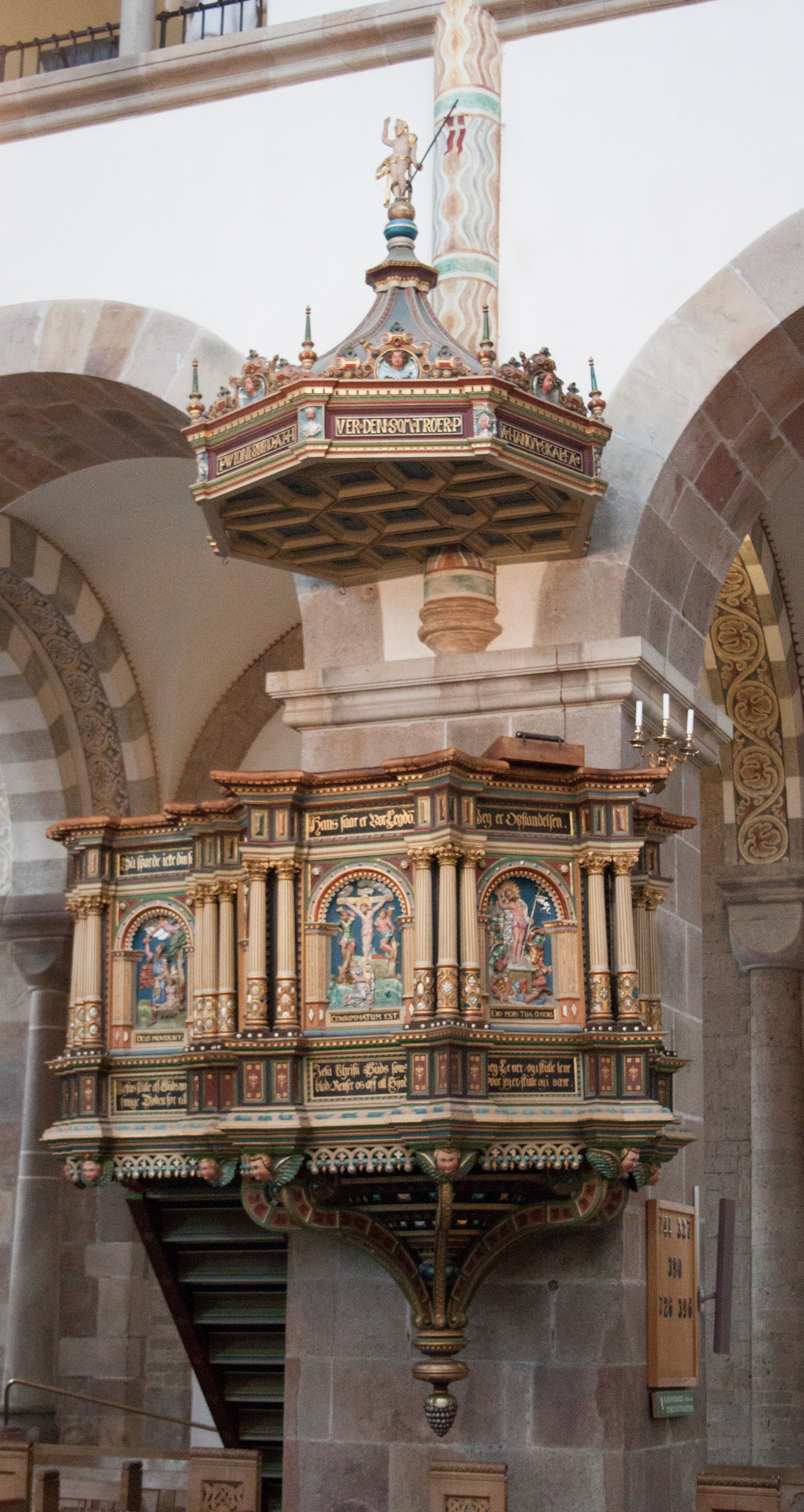
Pulpit by Jens Asmussen

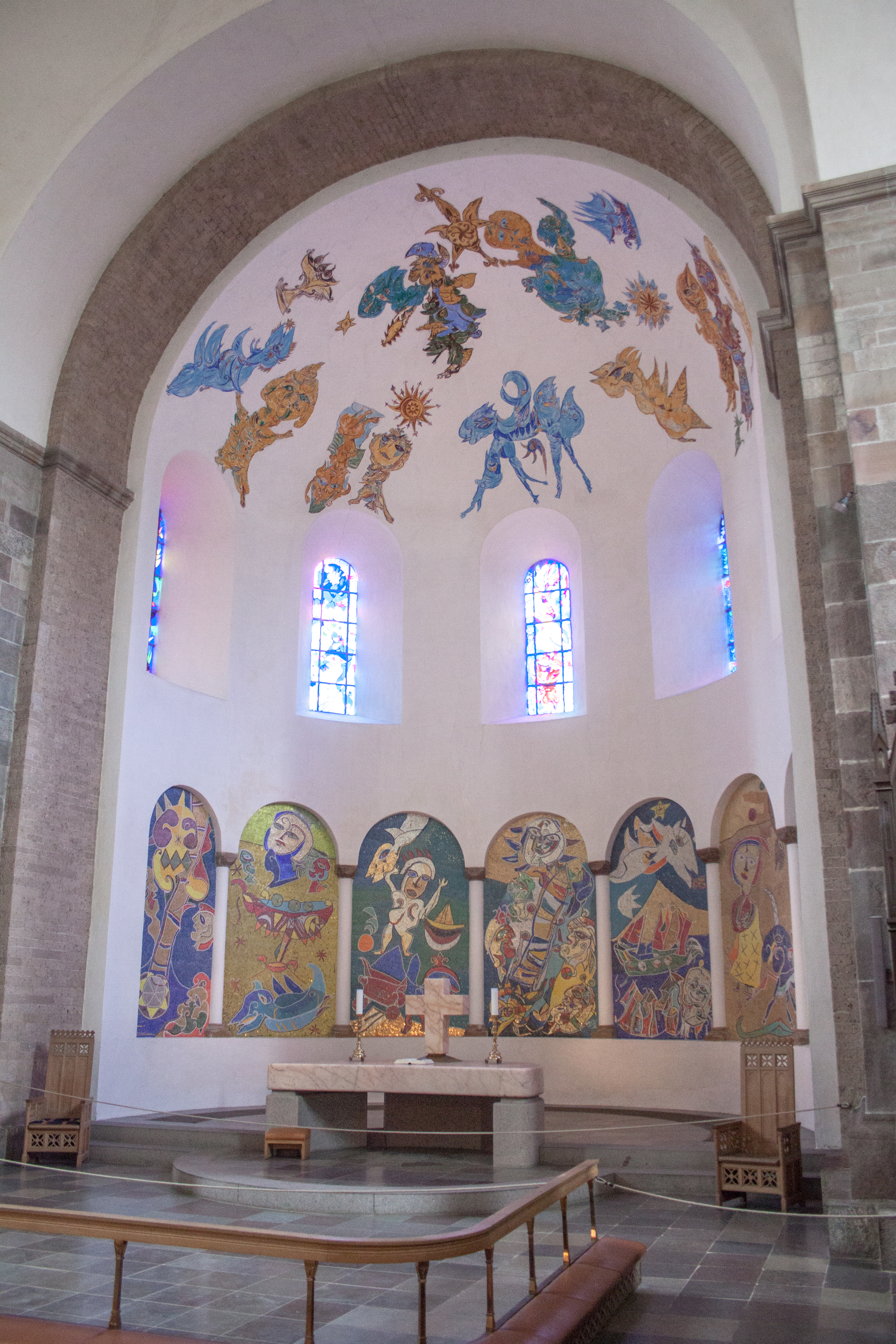
Apse by Carl Henning Pedersen

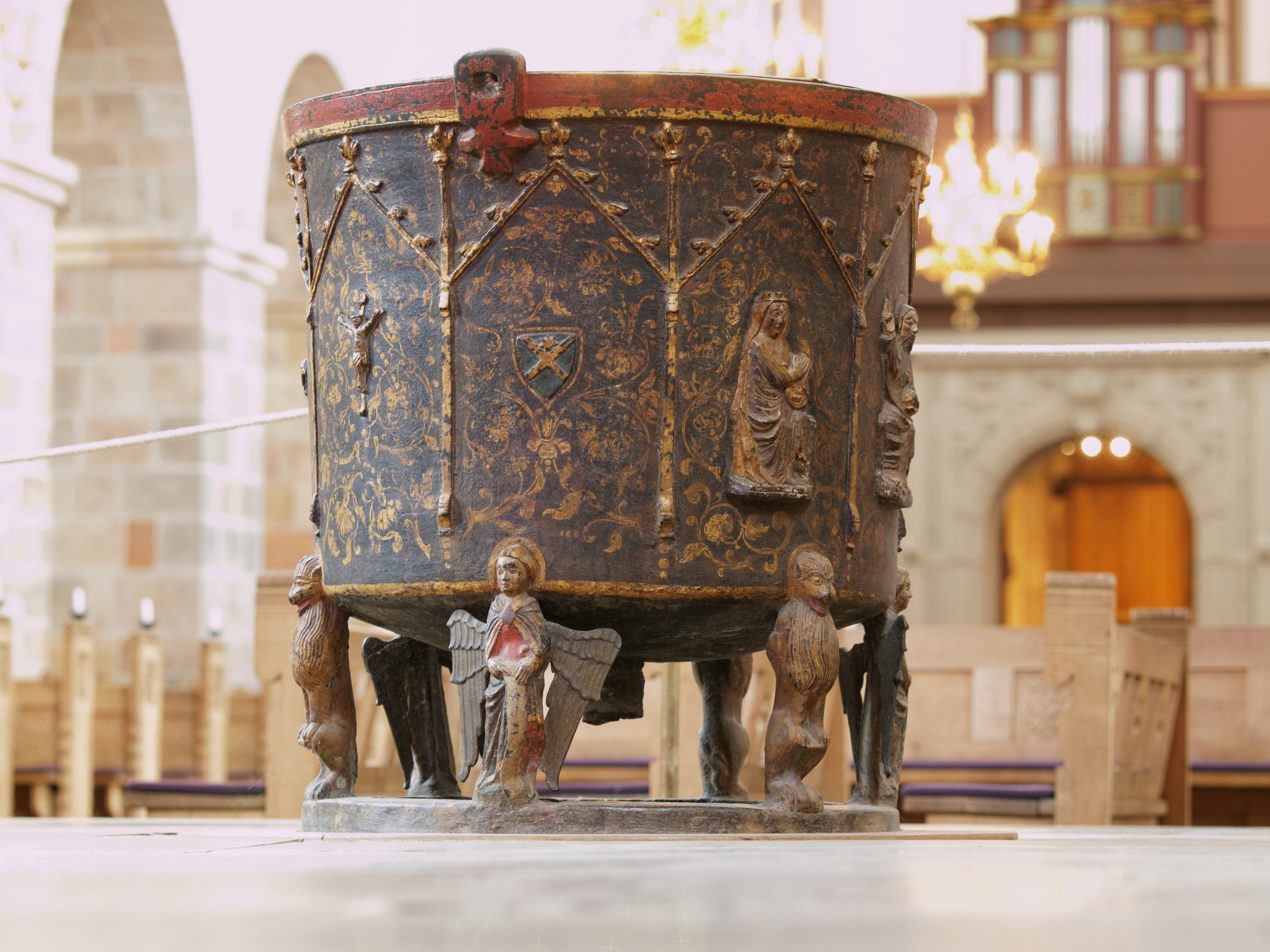
Bronze fountain from 1375

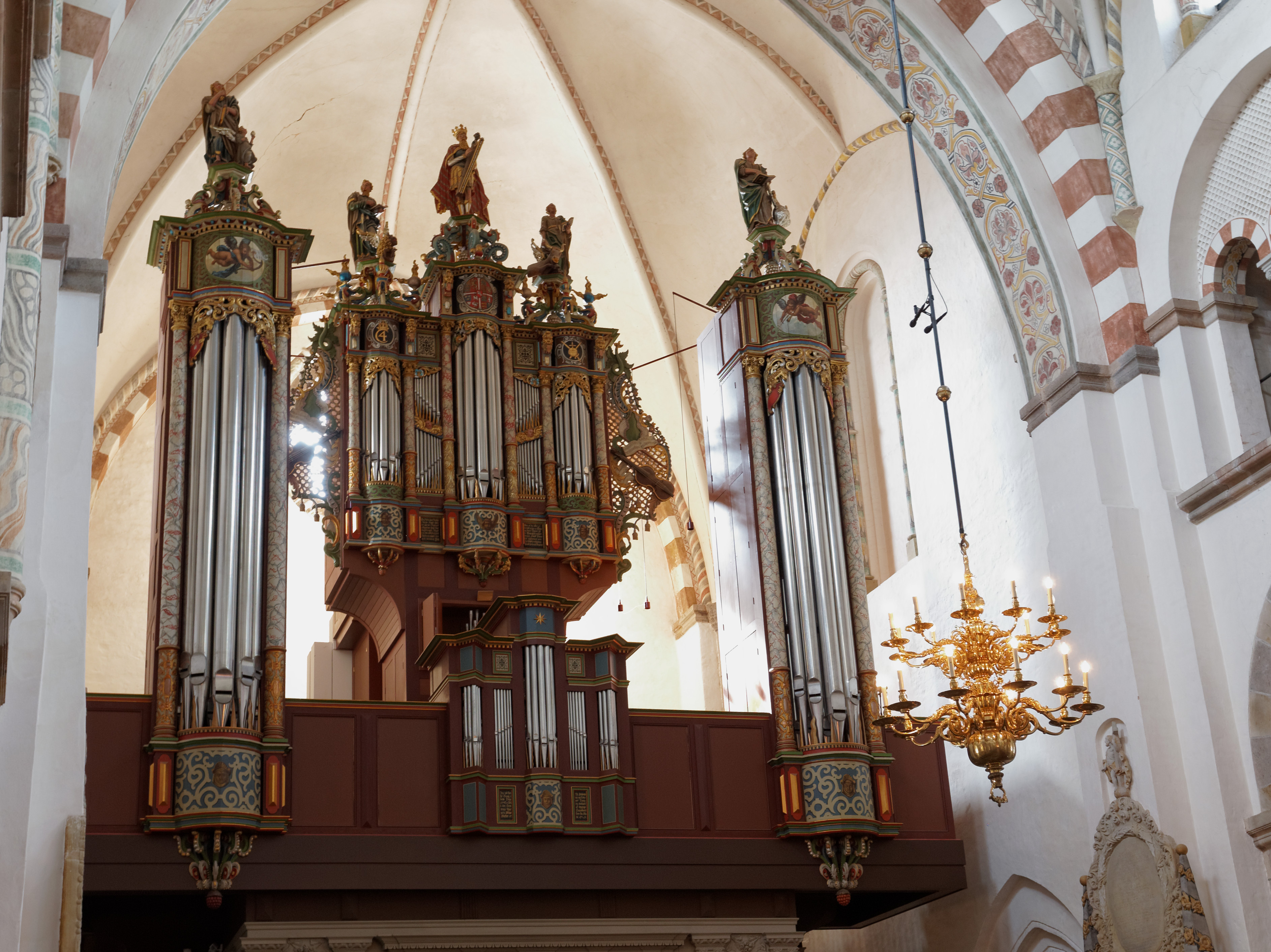
Cathedral Organ

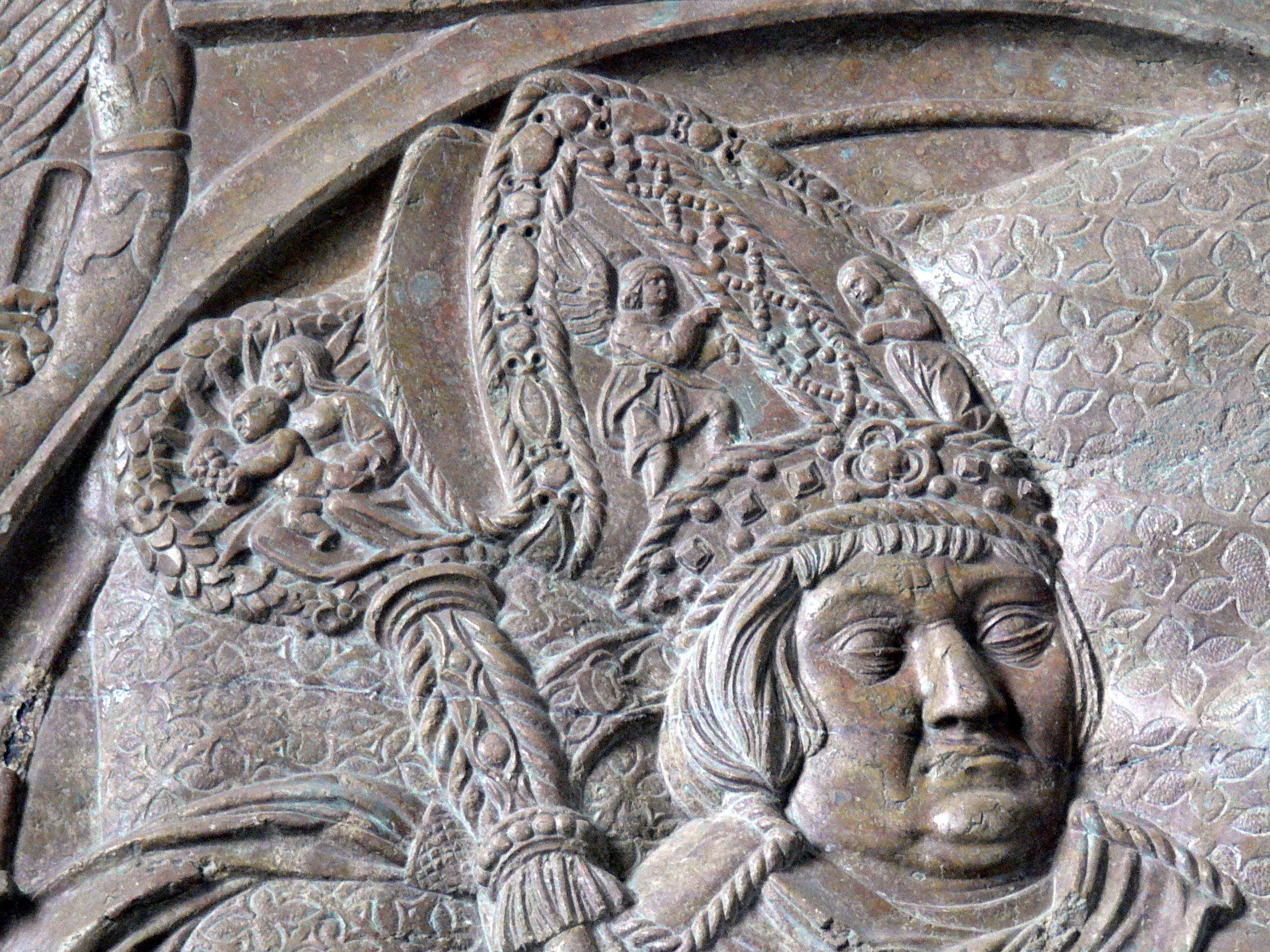
Epitaph of Bishop Ivar Munk

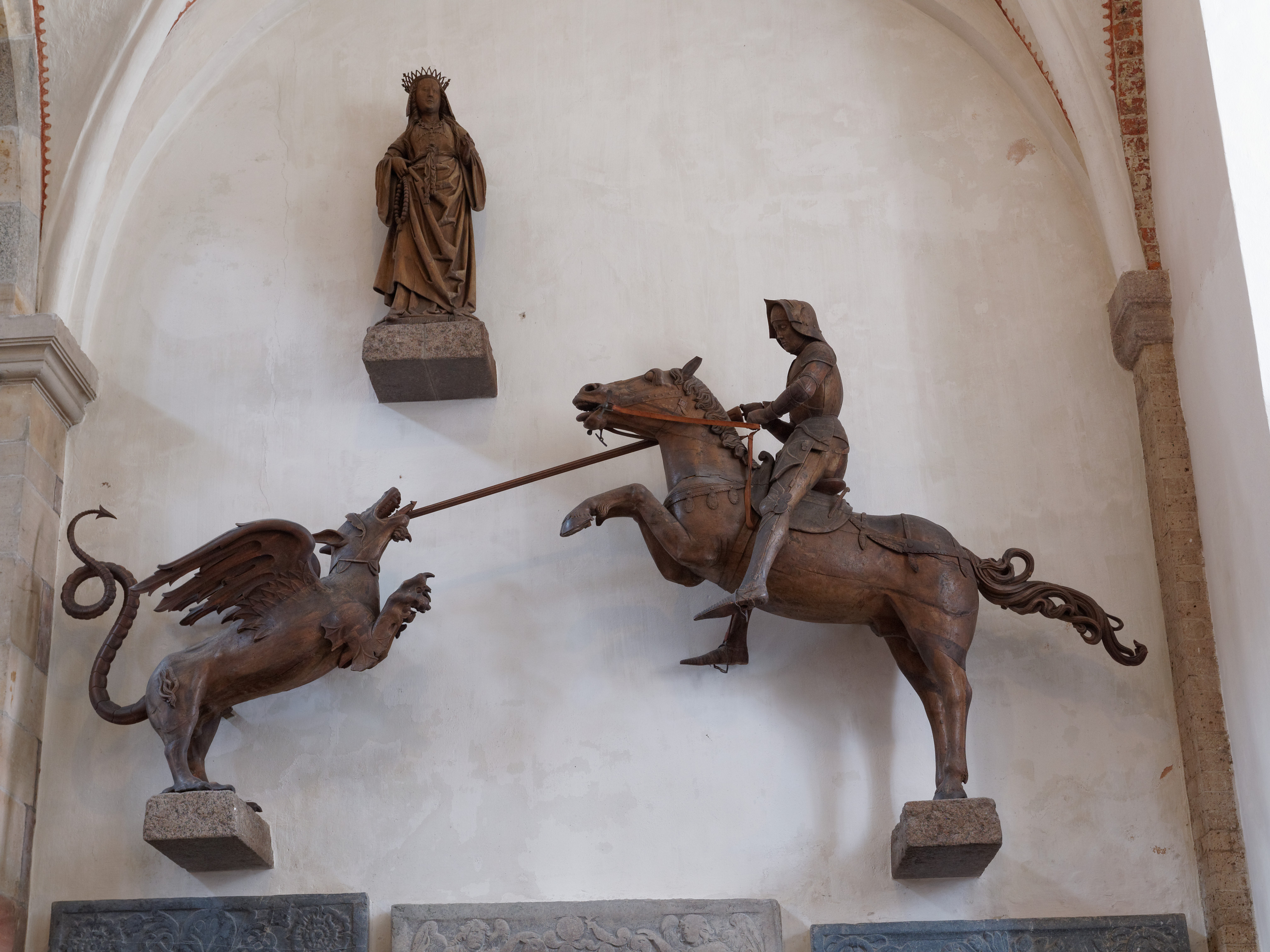
St. George and the Dragon

== Other Sources ==
- Danhostel Ribe: Ribe Cathedral. Well-sourced info.
- Kevin Knight: Ancient See of Ribe, New Advent
- Ribe Domkirke, Kirkeweb (English: Churchdesk). Official homepage for Ribe Cathedral. (in Danish)
- Danmarkshistorien.dk: Erik Emune ca. 1090-1137, Aarhus University (in Danish)
- Hans Nyholm (1996): Kirkeklokker i Danmark, Hikuin (Moesgård) (in Danish)
