= Elisabeth Dons Christensen =

Danish Lutheran theologian

Elisabeth Dons Christensen (born 14 May 1944) is a Danish Lutheran theologian who served as bishop for the Diocese of Ribe from 2003 until her retirement in 2014 at the age of 70.

== Biography ==
Dons Christensen was one of several brothers and sisters, born and raised in the country village of Vester Ørum near Vejle in the east of Jutland. She studied history and religious studies at Aarhus University, graduating in 1973. She received a doctorate in theology in 1993. From 1973, she was a high school and theological college teacher in Esbjerg and Ribe. During the same period, she served as an assistant pastor in Ribe Cathedral. In 1997, she was appointed as pastor in the parish of Søllerød just north of Copenhagen until she became the bishop for the Diocese of Ribe in 2003.

Her work as a bishop has included a special interest in baptismal training, serving as chair of the episcopal baptism committee. Her publications include Det sårbare samliv (Vulnerable Cohabitation, 2005), addressing the importance of a Christian relationship as a marriage matures.

In 1967, she married the director of Ribe County, Carl Henrik Dons Christensen, with whom she has four grown children. His uncle, Henrik Dons Christensen, who was bishop of Ribe encouraged her to enter the church. After becoming widowed in 1995, she married the lawyer Thomas Bonnor in 1999.

In January 2013, Elisabeth Dons Christensen was honoured as a Commander of the Order of the Dannebrog.
