= Ancient Diocese of Ribe =

Catholic diocese in Denmark

Diocese of Ribe Dioecesis Ripensis Ribe Stift
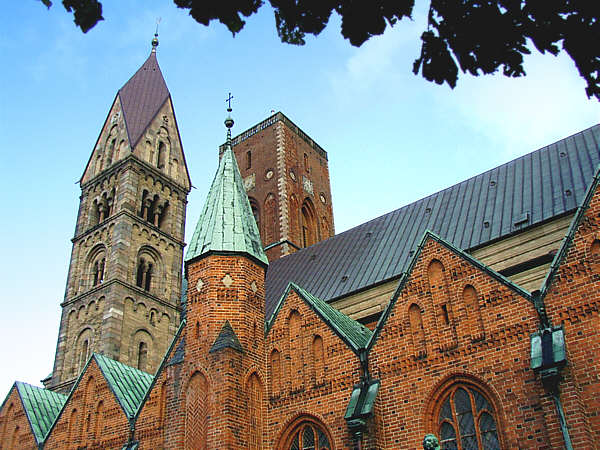
- Ribe Cathedral, seat of the bishop of Ribe.

Location
- Country: Denmark
- Ecclesiastical province: Lund
- Metropolitan: Archdiocese of Lund

Information
- Denomination: Roman Catholic
- Sui iuris church: Latin Church
- Rite: Roman Rite
- Established: 948
- Dissolved: 1536
- Cathedral: Ribe Cathedral 55.3281°N 8.7613°E

The former Diocese of Ribe (Danish: Ribe Stift) was a Roman Catholic diocese in Southern Jutland, Denmark. The diocese was established in 948, and dissolved in 1536 during the Protestant Reformation. Within the newly established protestant Church of Denmark, the Diocese of Ribe effectively replaced its Roman Catholic precursor.

The diocese contained 29 deaneries and 278 parishes. Its bishop also oversaw a number of monasteries and friaries, in addition to a hospital.

== History ==
Ribe was established as a diocese for Leofdag in 948 under the supervision of Adaldag, Archbishop of Hamburg, who was authorized by the Roman Curia to proselytize the Danes. Leofdag (Leofdag of Ribe) was consecrated by Adaldag, and attended the Synod of Ingelheim. Adam of Bremen praised Liafdag's pastoral zeal. Leofdag was martyred that same year, when a housecarl skewered him with a spear, as he forded the river at Ribe. He is regarded as a local saint, though he was never canonized. His remains would eventually end up in Ribe Cathedral. The name "Leofdag" indicates he was not Danish. According to Johannes Vastovius, Leofdag was born in Friesland. Until the death of his third known successor Vale (1044–59) the bishops of Ribe, Schleswig, and Aarhus wandered about Jutland on missionary tours.

Ribe Cathedral, which served as the central cathedral of the diocese, contains a shrine dedicated to him. Until the death of his third known successor, Val, the bishops of Ribe, Schleswig, and Aarhus primarily worked to convert locals to their faith and traveled around Jutland on missionary tours.

In 1060, the region north of the Kongeå in Jutland was divided into the four dioceses of Ribe, Aarhus, Viborg and Vestervig. The diocese was a suffragan of the Archdiocese of Hamburg-Bremen until 1104, when the newly formed Archdiocese of Lund became its metropolitan.

Although Ivar Munk was selected to take the position of bishop in 1499, he was not ordained until 1513. During his term, the church was pressured by the Protestant Reformation. He lost authority over some of his diocese in Northern Schleswig following their adoption of protestantism, though he maintained authority over the remainder of the diocese.

Ivar Munk opposed the selection of Christian III of Denmark as king in 1533, yet was forced to act as a privy councillor to the monarch's party for Jutland. As a result, he resigned from his position as bishop. Ivar Munk was succeeded by his nephew, Olaf Munk in 1534. As a result of the reformation, Olaf Munk was imprisoned on 12 August 1536, like all other catholic bishops in Denmark. He was later released on the conditions that he conform to the Church of Denmark and marry.

== Structure ==
The first church built within the diocese was founded by Ansgar ca. 855. It was initially overseen by his successor: Saint Rembert. The church was destroyed following Rembert's death in 888, though it was rebuilt circa 948. Following the completion of Ribe Cathedral in the 12th century, it served as the central cathedral of the diocese. The city of Ribe was also home to St. Nicholas' Priory, a Franciscan friary, St. Catherine's Priory, a hospital of the Holy Ghost, and a commandery of the Knights of St. John of Jerusalem. The diocese also oversaw the Cistercian monasteries of Tvis Abbey, Løgum Abbey, and Seem Abbey, which had been Benedictine until 1171. There were Benedictine convents at Gudum Priory and Stubber Priory, in addition to a Dominican priory in Vejle and a Franciscan friary in Kolding.

The diocese comprised 29 deaneries and a total of 278 parishes. The bishop's cathedral chapter included four prelates, 21 prebendaries, eight minor canons, and approximately 50 chaplains.

== Bishops ==
- 948–9?? Leofdag
- 988–1000 Folkbert/Folcbertus
- 1000–1043 Odinkar the Younger
- 1043–1060 Val
- 1060–1085 Odder
- 1085–1122 Gerold/Jareld
- 1122–1134 Thore/Thure
- 1134–11?? Nothold
- 11??–1142 Asger
- 1142–1162 Elias
- 1162–1170 Radulf
- 1171–1177 Stephan
- 1178–1204 Omer
- 1204–1214 Oluf
- 1214–1230 Tuve
- 1230–1246 Gunner
- 1246–1273 Esger
- 1273–1288 Tyge
- 1288–1313 Christian
- 1313–1327 Jens Hee
- 1327–1345 Jakob Splitaf
- 1345–1364 Peder Thuresen
- 1365–1369 Mogens Jensen
- 1369–1388 Jens Mikkelsen
- 1389–1409 Eskil
- 1409–1418 Peder Lykke
- 1418–1454 Christiern Hemmingsen
- 1454–1465 Henrik Stangenberg
- 1465–1483 Peder Nielsen Lodehat
- 1483–1498 Hartvig Juel
- 1499–1534 Ivar Munk
- 1534–1536 Olaf Munk
