= Johannes Vastovius =

Swedish priest and writer

Johannes Vastovius (active in the early 17th century, but his years of birth or death are unknown) was a Swedish priest and writer in the late reformation period.

Vastovius was a convert to Roman Catholicism and one of the followers of Polish-Swedish king Sigismund III Vasa. He became protonotarius publicus and canon in Warmia in Poland, and served Sigismund as chaplain and librarian. He is best known for his Vitis aquilonia ("The Vine of the North"), a collection of stories or legends of Scandinavian, mostly Swedish, saints from about 850 until the early 16th century, which was printed in Cologne in 1623. A new edition of the Vitis aquilonia was published in Uppsala in 1708 with comments by Erik Benzelius the Younger, who praised the carefulness and clarity of style of Vastovius. A 20th-century Swedish historian and philologist, on the other hand, has characterized the Vitis aquilonia as a "young and unclear" source in relationship to its medieval subject matter.
