= Stubber Priory =

Nunnery in Jutland

Coordinates: 56°26′52″N 8°54′38″E

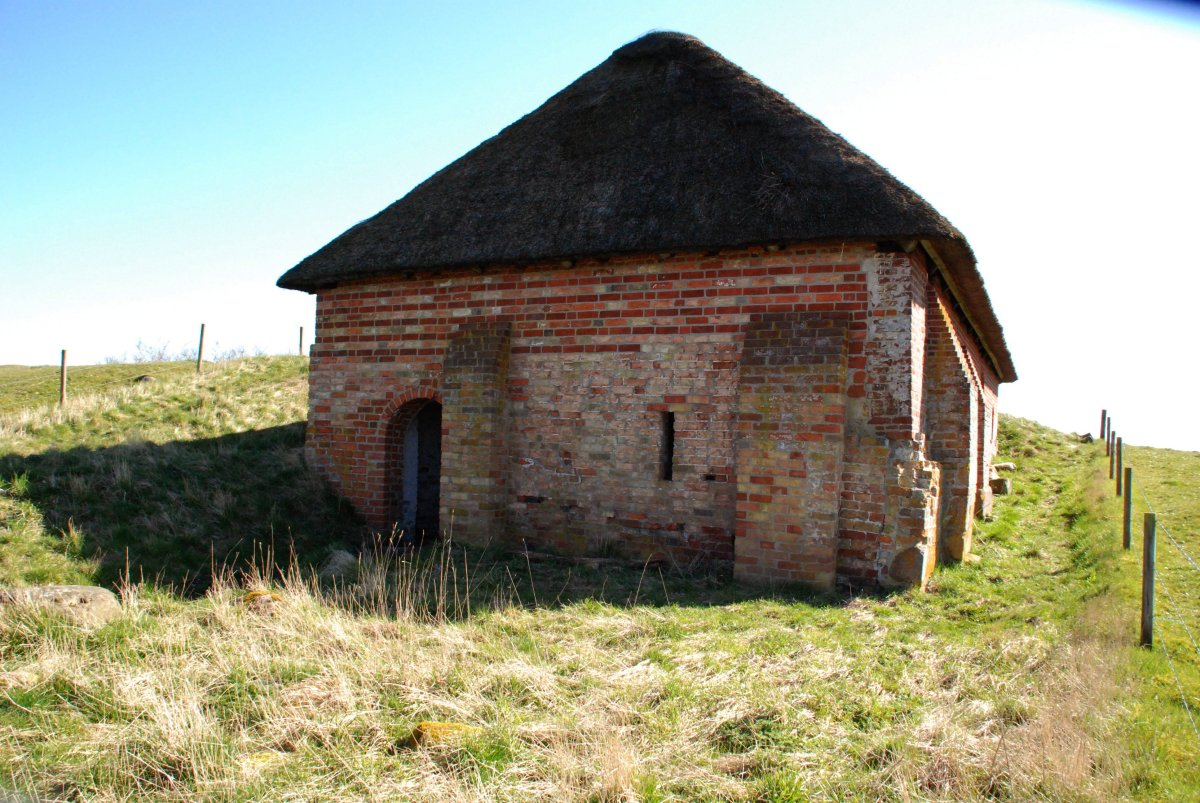
Stubber Abbey

Stubber Abbey was a small Benedictine nunnery in Sevel Parish, Ginding Herred in west central Jutland near Ringkøbing.

== History ==
Stubber Priory was a small Benedictine house isolated in the sand hills of far western Jutland. The priory was built on an island in Stubber Lake (Danish:Stubbersøen) connected to the mainland by an earthen causeway. Today the lake has been partially filled in and the site of the abbey is now part of the mainland. The island was large enough to build the small abbey, church, a farm, outbuildings, barn, and cemetery.

Establishing the date for the establishment of Stubber Priory is very difficult due to a lack of records which were destroyed when the priory was dissolved in 1547. But it is probable that the land for the abbey was donated by one Helm of Stubbethorp (the old name for the area where the abbey was built), not earlier than 1163. Helm is mentioned as a donor to Tvis Abbey. Helm apparently gave his farm at Stubberthorp to the Benedictines sometime between 1190 and 1220. The abbey is first mentioned by name in a letter of 1268 simply giving two marks to the priory from the wealthy widow of Esper Vognsen from Roskilde.

The particular order which operated the priory is never mentioned, but several hints in the few remaining letters make the Benedictine Order the most probable, though Stubber as a Cistercian house cannot be ruled completely out. The evidence comes from the land records for three farms which were created when the priory was sold to local land owners after 1538 which indicate transfer from Benedictine ownership.

The priory's name evolved over time from Stubthorp in 1268, Stubbaer 1438, Stubre in an atlas of 1450, and Stubber in 1500. Stubber Priory was under the control of the Bishop of Ribe and it is unknown which monastic house had responsibility for the priestly functions required by the nuns at Stubber Priory. The priory complex was built in the usual four-sided rectangle with the church as the south range.

The priory was run by the prioress. A prior, often a local noble was responsible for managing the farms and income to provide for the nuns. A few prioresses are mentioned in conjunction with court cases or gifts beginning in 1388 when Prioress Christine was given a cloak. Prioress Christine Palsdatter was in charge in 1457 through 1459 when the priory had legal troubles with a local knight, Niels Eriksen. The last Prioress "old" Else, was the niece of a powerful noble and was allowed to run the priory until it was closed, sometime in 1547.

The priory priests were usually elderly priests or canons from other monastic houses in the purview of the Bishop of Ribe. One of the priors, Jep Thomsen was made so poor by this post that he ran away from the priory. Prior Peter is mentioned in several letters, but who he was or what house he came from is not clear. More information about priors in the 14th and 15th centuries indicates Stubber was one of several small houses that required a priest where vacancies often went unfilled for long periods of time.

By the time of the Reformation, Stubber Priory owned many farms in the region as a result of gifts from individuals or families for services the nuns could render: prayers for the dead, nursing home, schooling, or from wills. Though a small house with perhaps 10-20 nuns, they had to eat, drink, and be clothed. The income from the farms and several churches made it possible for the nuns to live a religious life without doing farm work.

The buildings at the priory consisted of two groups: the farm buildings clustered roughly in a disconnected rectangle. The priory consisted of the thatched-roof church to the northwest, and four other buildings forming the south wall of the compound. A wall enclosed the large garden and cemetery next to the church. The exact location and use for each buildings has not been determined.

The Reformation brought an end to the Priory at Stubber. Since it was so isolated, it lasted longer as a priory than in other parts of Denmark. The priory and its estate became crown property and Stubber was given to local noblemen, Mogens Kaas, and Niels Juel on the condition that the 12 remaining nuns were provided for. In 1546 Iver Juel succeeded in purchasing the priory estate for more than 12,000 daler since the last of the nuns had left the priory. Juel immediately broke up the estate selling it to other, lesser noblemen for a profit. The priory building became Stubber Farm (Danish:Stubbergård). The holdings were passed down several generations, but the buildings became so dilapidated that the family abandoned the site, leaving the buildings uninhabited for more than 100 years. In 1870 the piles of rubble were mined for brick and stone leaving foundations on some parts of the priory more than two feet thick. Today a private residence has been built above the vaulted cellar room from ca. 1400 and parts of foundations are exposed on the privately owned site.

== Sources ==
- Stubber Klosters Historie Christensen, Villads. (in Danish)
- Salmonsens Conversationslexikon. 'Stuuber Koster'. p482
