= Maja Lisa Engelhardt =

Danish painter

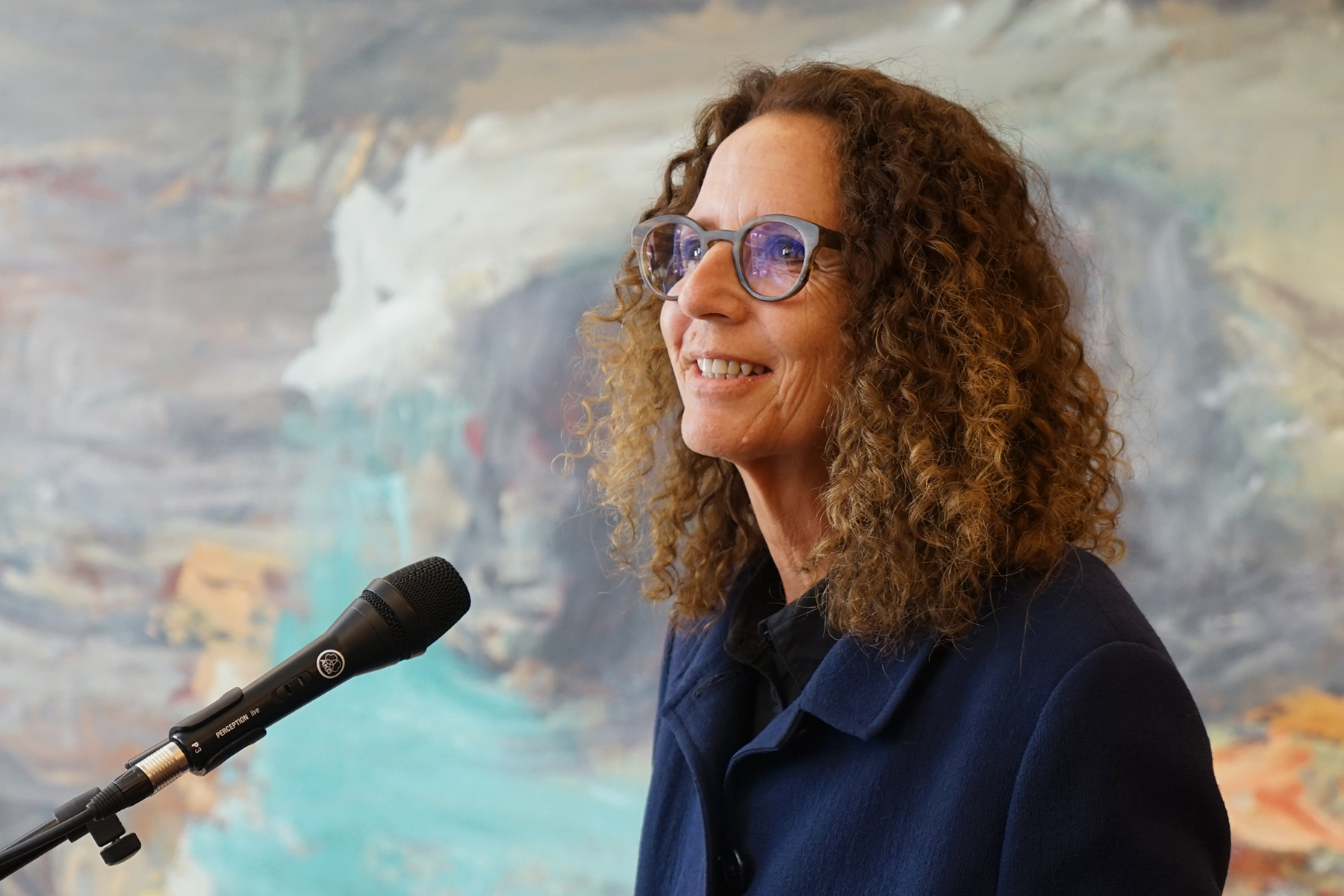
Maja Lisa Engelhardt (2018)

Maja Lisa Engelhardt (born 1956) is a Danish painter whose works are inspired by the landscapes of north-western Zealand where she was brought up. She now lives in Paris with her husband Peter Brandes who is also a painter. She has decorated several central buildings in Copenhagen and, more recently, has designed works for Danish churches.

== Early life and education ==
Engelhardt was born on 2 May 1956 in Frederiksberg, a wealthy part of Copenhagen, as the daughter of Knud Harald Jensen and his wife Elli Rasmussen. She grew up in the Sejerø Bay area on the Odsherred peninsula in west Zealand where she experienced a difficult childhood with an alcoholic mother and a threatening father, increasingly jealous of her artistic talents. Furthermore, she felt she had to protect her two younger sisters from her aggressive parents. Salvation came when she was 16 after she found Søren Kierkegaard's book Kjerlighedens Gerninger (Works of Love) in the library at Kalundborg. It inspired her to take the Christian message seriously, successfully leading her to convince her parents to behave more positively towards each other and towards the children. From that point on, she was able to enjoy a more productive life. A year later, she entered the Funen Art Academy where she graduated in 1980.

== Artistic career ==
Since 1981, she has lived with her husband Peter Brandes in Colombes just outside Paris but her works have continued to be inspired by the nature she experienced on Sejrø Bay during her childhood. She did not begin to exhibit until she was 29 although she had begun to draw and paint from an early age. She received immediate recognition in 1985 when she first exhibited at the Nikolaj Gallery in Copenhagen. This was followed in 1987 by her participation at Copenhagen's Charlottenborg and Paris's Grand Palais. In 1995, she enjoyed considerable success in New York. Her images are essentially abstract but they always contain memories of the Danish landscape with strong connections to nature expressed in bright, rich colours ranging from solidly sketched sections to hazy, almost weightless fragments.

In Denmark, Engelhardt has contributed to the decoration of the then Kjøbenhavns Telefon Aktieselskab headquarters in Copenhagen, Danmarks Radio, Copenhagen University with her tapestries Noli me tangere (2000) and Embla (2002) and the Supreme Court of Denmark with four large paintings in 2004. More recently she has designed works for Danish churches including a huge bronze door for Viborg Cathedral in 2012.
