= Peter Brandes =

Danish artist (1944–2025)

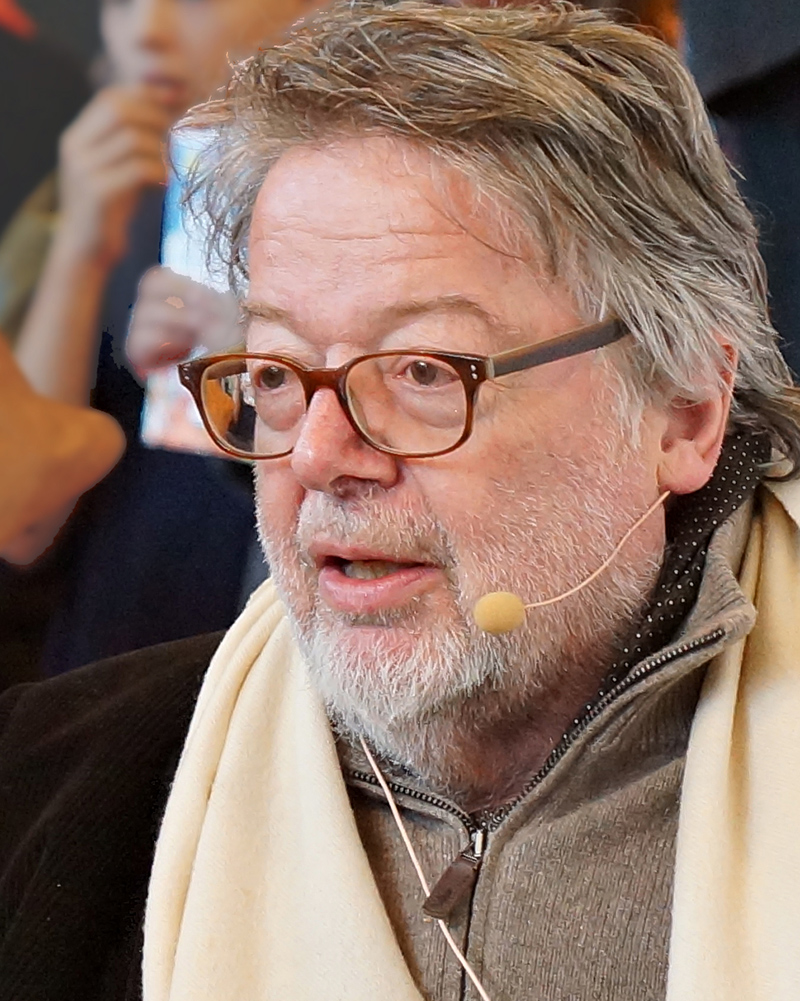
Brandes in 2014

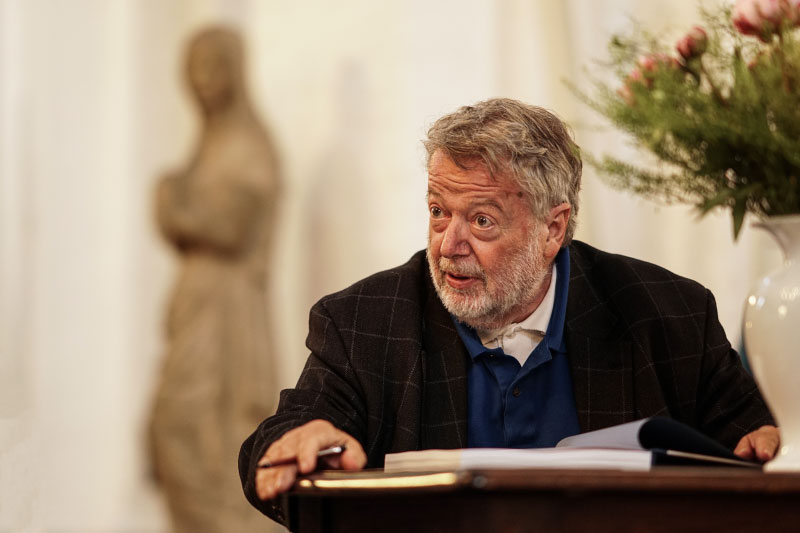
Brandes in 2020

Peter Brandes (5 March 1944 – 4 January 2025) was a Danish painter, sculptor, ceramic artist, and photographer.

== Biography ==
Brandes' art is abstract and often in brown colours. He had his breakthrough as artist in the beginning of the 1980s. He has, inter alia, done artwork on Roskilde Domkirke and mosaic (colored glass) windows in a church at Nordkap and the church Village of Hope, south of Los Angeles. In 1998, he created the enormous Roskilde Jars which stand outside the main Roskilde railway station.

Brandes was self-taught and his art circles around themes from Christianity. Ancient Greek mythology also inspired his art. Brandes has illustrated a number of books, for example Homer's Iliad. A great part of Brandes' ceramic works are inspired by ancient Greek art and mythology.

Brandes died on 4 January 2025, at the age of 80. At the time of his death Brandes lived in Colombes, near Paris, with his wife, Maja Lise Engelhardt, who is also a painter.

== Represented ==
- Statens Museum for Kunst
- ARoS Aarhus Kunstmuseum
- Ny Carlsberg Glyptotek
- Danish Museum of Art & Design
- Vejle Kunstmuseum
- Kunstmuseet Trapholt
- Nordjyllands Kunstmuseum
- Horsens Kunstmuseum
- Randers Kunstmuseum
- Sønderjyllands Kunstmuseum
- Skovgaard museum
- Funen's Art Museum
- Danmarks Keramikmuseum – Grimmerhus
- Cornerstone University Chapel
