= Diocese of Ribe =

Diocese of Ribe Ribe Stift
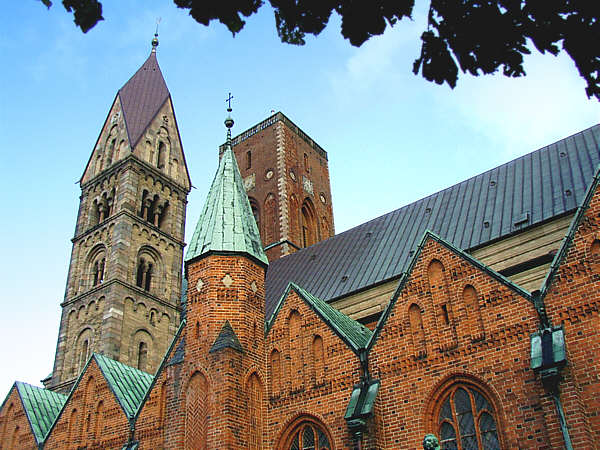
- The Cathedral of the diocese.

- Coat of arms

Location
- Country: Denmark

Statistics
- Population: Total: (as of 2020); 355,839
- Members: 295,860 (83.1%)

Information
- Denomination: Church of Denmark
- Cathedral: Our Lady Cathedral of Ribe

Current leadership
- Bishop: Elof Westergaard

The Diocese of Ribe (Danish: Ribe Stift) is a diocese within the Church of Denmark. Ribe Cathedral serves as the central cathedral within the diocese. Since 2014, the bishop has been Elof Westergaard.

The former Roman Catholic Diocese of Ribe was formed in 948 and oversaw much of southern Jutland. During the Protestant Reformation, the diocese converted to Lutheranism alongside the formation of the Church of Denmark. Thus, the diocese in its current form was established in 1536.

As of 2020, the diocese oversees 219 individual churches in 200 sogns, which are divided among 8 deaneries. The diocese covers a region with a population of 355,839, of which 295,860 are members of the church.

== List of Bishops ==
- Johann Wenth, 1537–1541
- Hans Tausen, 1541–1561
- Poul Madsen, 1562–1569
- Hans Laugesen, 1569–1594
- Peder Jensen Hegelund, 1595–1614
- Iver Iversen, 1614–1629
- Jens Dinesen Jersin, 1629–1634
- Hans Borchardsen, 1635–1643
- Erik Monrad, 1643–1650
- Peder Jensen Kragelund, 1650–1681
- Christen Jensen Lodberg, 1681–1693
- Ancher Anchersen, 1693–1701
- Christian Muus, 1701–1712
- Johannes Ocksen, 1712–1713
- Laurids Thura, 1713–1731
- Matthias Anchersen, 1731–1741
- Hans Adolph Brorson, 1741–1764
- Jørgen Bloch Carstens, 1764–1773
- Eiler Eilersen Hagerup, 1773–1774
- Tønne Bloch, 1774–1786
- Stephan Middelboe, 1786–1811
- Victor Christian Hjort, 1811–1818
- Stephan Tetens, 1819
- Jens Michael Hertz, 1819–1825
- Conrad Daniel Koefoed, 1825–1831
- Nicolai Fogtmann, 1831–1833
- Tage Christian Müller, 1833–1849
- Jacob Brøgger Daugaard, 1850–1867
- Carl Frederik Balslev, 1867–1895
- Carl Viggo Gøtzche, 1895–1901
- Peter Gabriel Koch, 1901–1922
- Oluf Peter Kirstein Vogn Olesen, 1923–1930
- Søren Westergaard Mejsen, 1930–1939
- Carl Immanuel Scharling, 1939–1949
- Morten Christian Lindegaard, 1949–1956
- Henrik Dons Christensen, 1956–1980
- Helge Skov, 1980–1991
- Niels Holm, 1991–2003
- Elisabeth Dons Christensen, 2003–2014
- Elof Westergaard, 2014–present

== List of diocesan governors ==
- (1658-1674) Hans Schack
- (1674-1683) Otto Didrik Schack
- (1683-1697) Frans Eberhard von Speckhan
- (1697-1711) Hans Schack
- (1711-1726) Henrik Ernst von Kalnein
- (1726-1748) Christian Carl Gabel
- (1748-1750) Holger Skeel (1699-1764)
- (1750-1754) Frederik Oertz
- (1750-1760) Georg Frederik von Holstein
- (1760-1768) Hans Schack
- (1768-1781) Theodosius von Levetzau
- (1781-1790) Christian Urne
- (1791-1796) Carl Frederik Hellfried
- (1796-1810) Werner Jasper Andreas Moltke
- (1811-1822) Hans Koefoed (suspended 1821)
- )1822-1828) Johan Carl Thuerecht Castenschiold
- (1828-1852= Marius Sabinus Wilhelm Sponneck
- (1852-1855) Hans Helmuth Lüttichau
- (1855-1884) Henrik Christian Nielsen
- (1884-1892) Hannes Finsen
- (1892-1899) Johan Henrik Ahnfeldt
- (1899-1921) Gustav Stemann
- (1921-1937) Peter Herschend
- (1937-1959) Ulrik Christian Friis
- (1959-1977) Ebbe Morten Edelberg
