= Ancient Diocese of Børglum =

Roman Catholic diocese in Denmark (1056–1536)

Coordinates: 57.36901°N 9.79928°E

Diocese of Børglum Dioecesis Burglanensis Børglum Stift
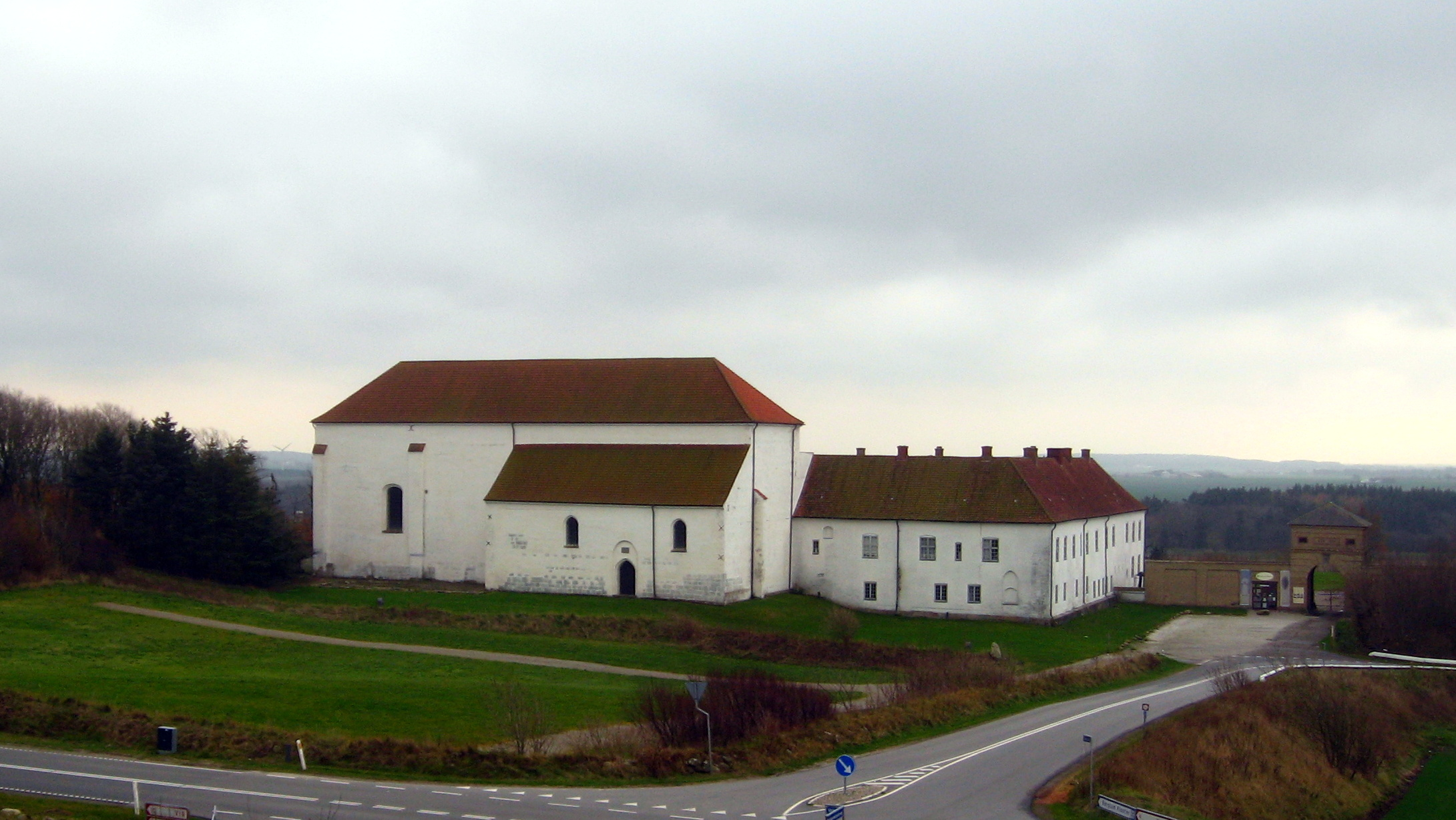
- Børglum Abbey, seat of the bishop of Børglum.

Location
- Country: Denmark
- Metropolitan: Archdiocese of Lund

Information
- Denomination: Roman Catholic
- Rite: Roman Rite
- Established: 1056
- Dissolved: 1536

The former Diocese of Børglum (Danish: Børglum Stift) was a Roman Catholic diocese in Northern Jutland, Denmark. It has also been referred to as the Diocese of Vestervig or the Bishopric of Vendsyssel. The diocese included the historic districts of Vendsyssel, Hanherred, Thy, and Mors.

The diocese was first established in 1056, and was dissolved in 1536 during the Protestant Reformation. It was eventually replaced by the Diocese of Aalborg within the Church of Denmark.

== Domain ==
The diocese was established in 1059, when the region of Jutland north of the Limfjord separated from the Diocese of Viborg. It was originally a suffragan of the archdiocese of Hamburg-Bremen until 1104, when the Diocese of Lund was elevated to an archdiocese and became Børglum's metropolitan see. Initially, the seat of the bishop was located in Vestervig, and the diocese was referred to as Vestervig or Vendelbo Stift.

The diocese had major ecclesiastical centers at Børglum Abbey and Vestervig Abbey, though it had a variety of other monasteries. This included the Benedictine nunneries of Frejlev Abbey (1268–1554), Hundslund Abbey (1268–1536) and Ø Abbey (1160–1542). The diocese also oversaw the Knights of St. John at Dueholm Priory (1351–1539) and the Carmelite priory at Saeby (ca. 1460–1536).

== History ==
Vestervig was the residence of Theodgar, a missionary from Thuringia who had been chaplain to King Olaf II of Norway. After Olaf's death in 1030, Thøger embarked on a missionary trip to Vestervig, where he built a small church. After his death in 1067, he was canonized despite opposition from both King Sweyn II and the current Bishop of the diocese, Albrik. Eventually, Saint Theodgar became the patron saint of the diocese.

The diocese's first Bishop, Magnus, was drowned in the Elbe river around the year 1060, shortly after he had taken up the position. He had been returning home after his consecration had been performed by Adalbert of Hamburg. Magnus was succeeded by Albrik, Dean of Bremen. Albrik's successor, Bishop Henry, was chaplain to King Canute IV, and accompanied him during his stay in Vendsyssel in 1086.

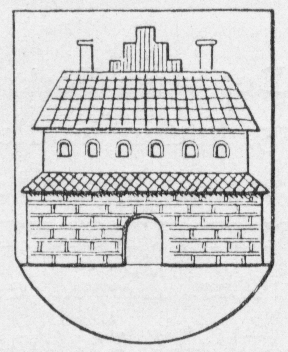
Børglum Abbey, featured on the coat of arms of the former Børglum Herred

During the 1130s, Bishop Sylvester transferred the seat of the diocese to Børglum. At about the same time, a monastic foundation was settled there which later became known as Børglum Abbey, although there is little information about the original organization. Around 1180, the Premonstratensian canons of Steinfeld Abbey in Germany settled nearby. Around 1220, the Bishop of Børglum made the abbey his seat; the abbey church then became the cathedral of the diocese, and its canons formed the diocesan chapter with power to elect the bishop.

Niels Stygge Rosenkranz was Bishop of Børglum from 1486 until 1533. His nephew, Stygge Krumpen, had served as his coadjutor bishop and succeeded him. During this period, the catholic church's authority in Denmark was threatened by the Reformation. Bishop Stygge Krumpen made attempts to slow the adoption of Protestantism, but was ultimately imprisoned in 1536 when the Reformation was formally introduced into Denmark. He was released in 1542 and then oversaw the Asmild Abbey convent near Viborg. He died there in 1551.

A relatively unknown fairy tale by Hans Christian Andersen, written in 1861, is titled The Bishop of Børglum and his Men (Danish: Bispen paa Børglum og hans Frænde). The story follows the murder of Bishop Oluf Glob and several of his followers at Hvidebjerg Church in 1260. Andersen based his story on an account of the incident which had been recorded by a noble family around the year 1600, though the historical accuracy of this account is subject to debate.

== Bishops ==
- Magnus, ca. 1060
- Albrik, ca. 1060–1065
- Keld 11??–1134
- Sylvester 1134–1136
- Tyge, ca. 11??–1177
- Omer 1178–1183
- Rudolf, 12??–1252
- Oluf Glob, 1252–1260
- Johannes de Hethe, 12??–1280
- Tyge Klerk, ca. 1328–13?
- Anders, ca. 1345–1354
- Mogens Jensen Grubbe, ca. 1369
- Jens Mikkelsen, 1365–1369
- Svend, 1370–1396
- Peder Friis, 1396–1425
- Paul Gobelinus Bolant, 1431–1432
- Gerhard Peder Gyldenstierne, 1433–1452
- Jacob Friis Loddehat (Jep Friis), 1453–1486
- Niels Stygge Rosenkrantz, 1487–1533
- Stygge Krumpen, 1533–1551
