= Vrejlev Priory =

Coordinates: 57.3615°N 10.0027°E

Vrejlev Priory (Vrejlev Kloster) is a former Danish priory which dates back to the 13th century. The priory located at Vrejlev, near Vrå, Region Nordjylland, Denmark. Between 1165 and the Protestant Reformation, it was operated as a Premonstratensian nunnery.

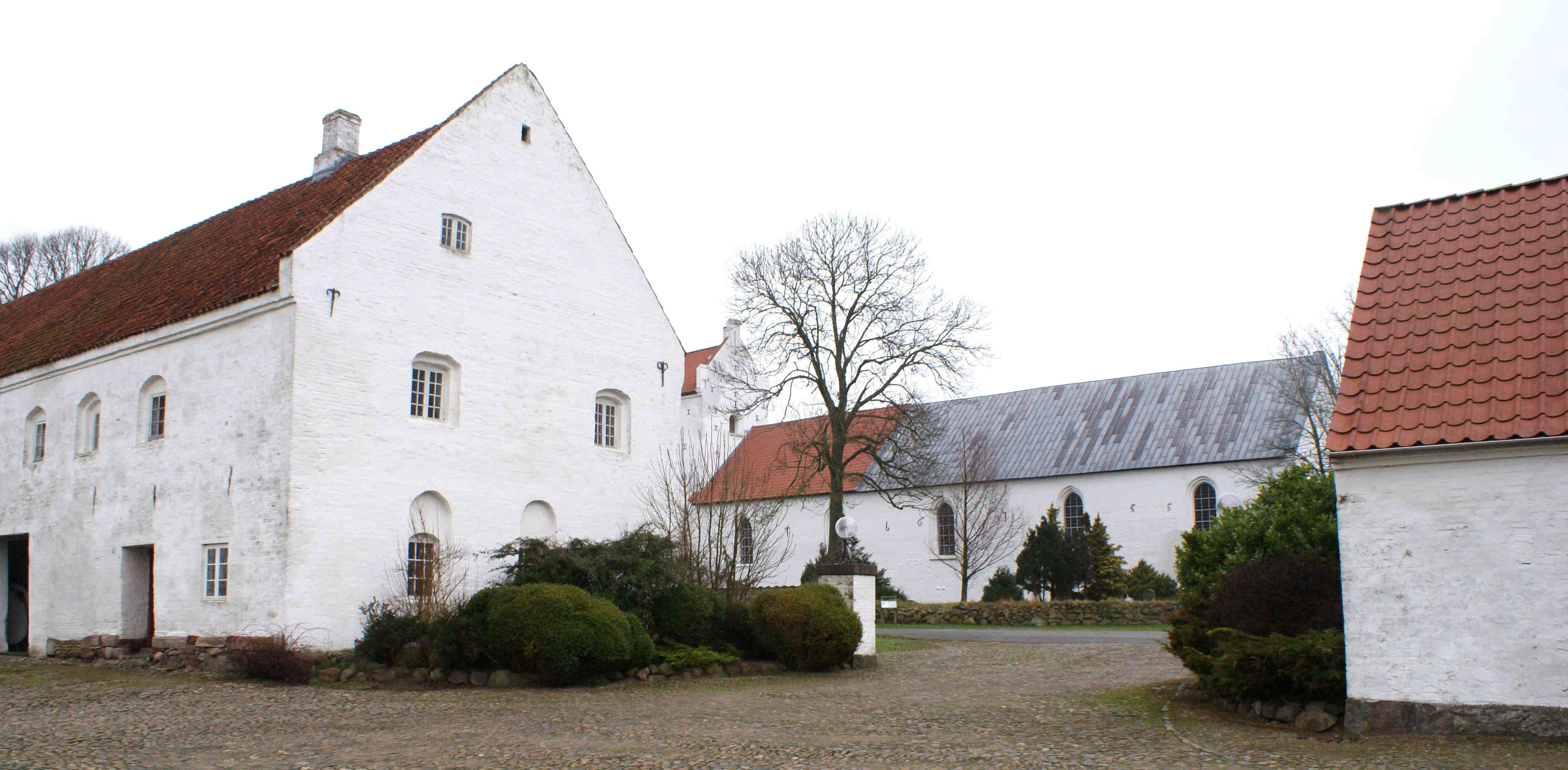
Vrejlev Priory

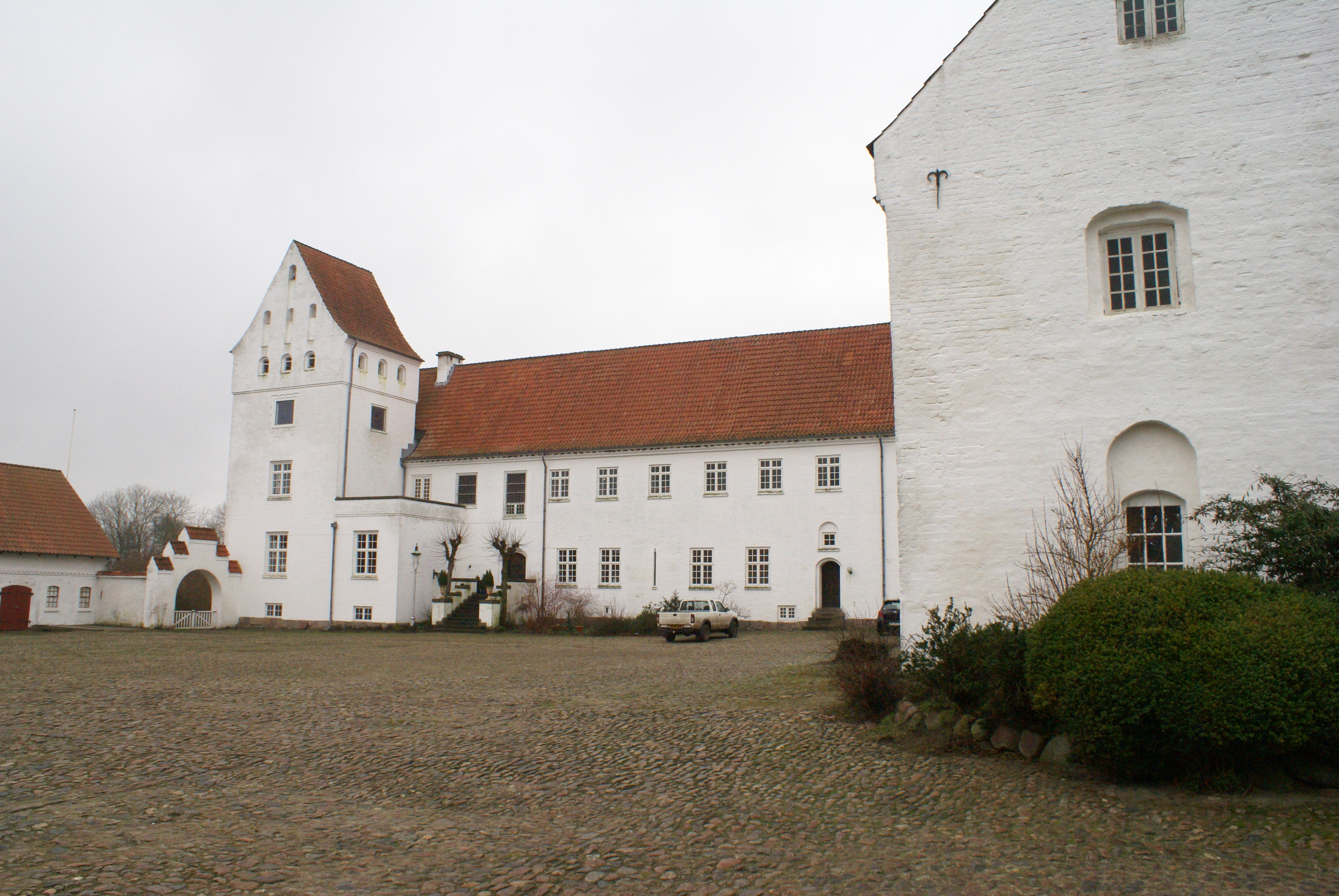
Vrejlev Priory

== History ==
Vrejlev Priory was founded as a daughter house by canons from Børglum Abbey about 1165. It was small and built out of granite blocks. After a catastrophic fire in 1200 which destroyed the entire premises, it was decided to rebuild. 12 residential cells were built into the new north range for the Premonstratensian nuns who were to live in the rebuilt priory. Another range contained the refectory and cellars, and a third range housed lay sisters, usually unmarried young women or widows whose families paid for the privilege of living alongside the nuns. A cloister completed the four-sided complex.

After the fire in 1200, the church was expanded into a three aisled Romanesque structure built of less expensive brick. It was remodelled in 1400 to form a church with two aisles in the Gothic style by removing the outside nave, leaving the church asymmetrical in form. The existing tower was added and the bell hung, which was cast by P.H.P in 1400 and is still rung in the tower today. The priory and nuns were led by the prioress, while the provost, or prior, who was often a layman and local nobleman, acted for them in secular matters. Some priors lived at Børglum Abbey and were monks, but served the same purpose. Over time the priory came into possession of several farms and other income properties, though it was by no means wealthy. The rents helped sustain the priory and its works.

== Dissolution ==
Vrejlev Priory fared badly in the 1520s and 1530s during the Danish Reformation. It had been necessary for Vrejlev to be taken under the protection of Bishop Stygge Krumpen in the reign of King Frederick I because it could not sustain itself. The priory was occupied by rebels under Skipper Clement in his short-lived rebellion of 1534 and given to Claus Iversen Dyre (1500 -1547). When King Christian III's army crushed the revolt later that year, the priory fell to the crown, which appointed a bailiff to secularize it. The priory church became the parish church of Vrejlev. The nuns were permitted to remain for a time, but the cost of maintaining them there was prohibitive, and the former nuns eventually moved or married.

In 1575, the estate was given to the nobleman Jens Clausen Bille til Billesholm (1531-1575). After 1609 it passed to a succession of noble families who remodelled the conventual buildings for use as a manor house and estate buildings. . Since 1932, the former abbey has been owned by members of the family of Svend Malthe Holst (1906-2002). The existing Vrejlev Kloster estate incorporates two of the conventual ranges which have survived to modern times, the rest having been demolished.

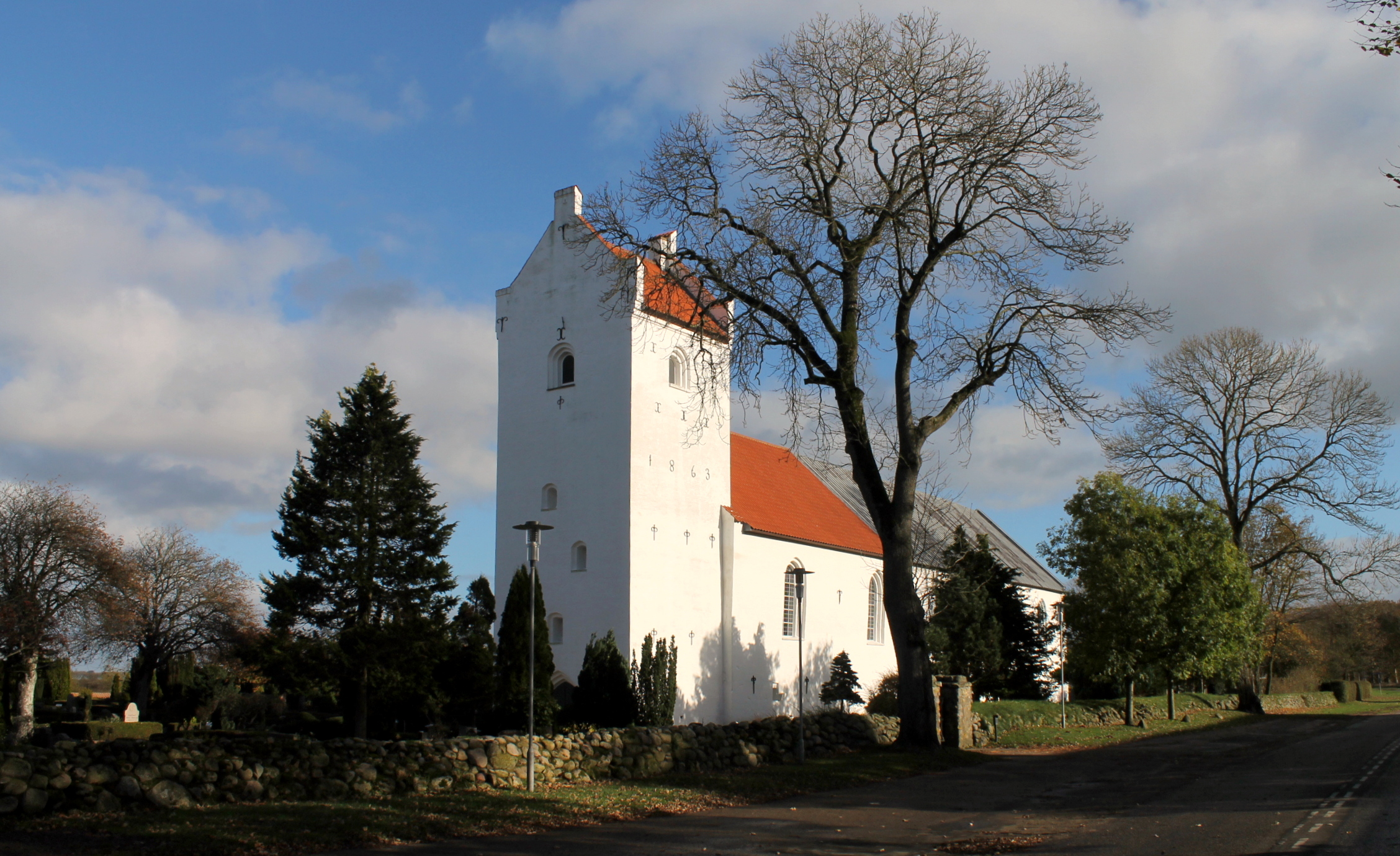
Vrejlev Church

== Vrejlev Church ==
Vrejlev Church (Vrejlevs kyrka) was originally a convent church to Vrejlev Priory. The original Romanesque church from the 13th century was rebuilt in late Gothic style around 1400 and the flat roof was replaced by arched arches. After the Reformation, the church served as the local parish church but was also the family church for the local resident nobles, and so was continuously repaired, embellished, and stocked with fine church furniture. The church remained largely unchanged from the Middle Ages. There was a raised enclosure to separate the nobles and their guests from the rest of the congregation that was only removed in 1864, when the church became a parish church for Vrejlev-Hæstrup parish in the Diocese of Aalborg.

== Other sources ==
- Pia Katrine Lindholt (2017) Vrejlev Kloster : et nordjysk præmonstratensernonnekloster (Højbjerg : Middelalder-arkæologisk Nyhedsbrev) ISBN 9788789382593
