= Vestergade 1 =

Vestergade 1 may refer to:_

- Vestergade 1, Copenhagen, a heritage listed building in Copenhagen
- Vestergade 1, Hjørring, a heritage listed building in Hjørring
