= Listed buildings in Hjørring Municipality =

This is a list of listed buildings in Hjørring Municipality, Denmark.

== The list ==
=== 9480 Løkken ===
Listing name	Image	Location	Coordinates	Description
Lækken		Nørregade 12, 9480 Løkken		0
Løkken Båke		Sømærkevej 0, 9480 Løkken		0

=== 9760 Vrå ===
Listing name	Image	Location	Coordinates	Description
Børglum Abbey		Børglum Klostervej 255A, 9760 Vrå		0
Vrejlev Priory		Vrejlev Kloster 1, 9760 Vrå		
Vrejlev Priory		Vrejlev Kloster 3A, 9760 Vrå		

=== 9800 Hjørring ===
Listing name	Image	Location	Coordinates	Description
Amtmandsboligen		Amtmandstoften 1, 9800 Hjørring		Half timbered rectory from 1724, located next to the graveyard Farum Church
Bøgsted		Bøgstedvej 170, 9800 Hjørring		
Hjørring Latin School		Skolegade 8, 9800 Hjørring		0
Fuglsang		Fuglsigvej 161, 9800 Hjørring		0
Hhørring Art Museum		Brinck Seidelins G 10, 9800 Hjørring		0
Hhørring Town Hall		Torvet 6, 9800 Hjørring		0
Høgholt		Hørmestedvej 130, 9870 Sindal		0
Høgholt		Hørmestedvej 132A, 9870 Sindal		0
Høgholt		Hørmestedvej 132C, 9870 Sindal		0
Nørregade 35		Nørregade 35, 9800 Hjørring		0
Nørretorv 10-15		Nørre Torv 10, 9800 Hjørring		0
Odden Manor		Oddenvej 31A, 9800 Hjø		0
Provstegården		Vestergade 1, 9800 Hjørring		
Provstegården		Vestergade 1, 9800 Hjørring		0
Provstegården		Vestergade 1, 9800 Hjørring		0
Søndergade 9		Søndergade 9A, 9800 Hjørring		0
Vestergade 8		Vestergade 8, 9800 Hjørring		

=== 9850 Hirtshalsl ===
Listing name	Image	Location	Coordinates	Description
Hirtshals Kro		Havnegade 2, 9850 Hirtshals		

=== 9870 Sindal ===
Listing name	Image	Location	Coordinates	Description
Baggesvogn		Baggesvognsvej 499A, 9870 Sindal		
Pakhustorvet 1-3		Pakhustorvet 1, 9870 Sindal		
Sindal Post Office		Jernbanegade 6, 9870 Sindal		

=== 9850 Hirtshalsl ===
Listing name	Image	Location	Coordinates	Description
Stensbæk		Stensbæk 2, 9881 Bindslev		
