= Thomas Reinholdt Rasmussen =

Danish theologian

The Right Reverend Thomas Reinholdt Rasmussen
- Bishop of Aalborg
- Church: Church of Denmark
- Diocese: Aalborg
- Elected: 27 October 2021
- In office: 2021-present
- Predecessor: Henning Toft Bro

Orders
- Ordination: 1999
- Consecration: 12 December 2022 by Peter Skov-Jakobsen

Personal details
- Born: 29 February 1972 (age 54) Frederikshavn, Denmark
- Denomination: Lutheran
- Spouse: Anne
- Children: 3
- Education: University of Copenhagen

Thomas Reinholdt Rasmussen (born 29 February 1972 in Frederikshavn) is a Danish theologian and current Bishop of Aalborg.

== Biography ==
Rasmussen was born in Frederikshavn on 29 February 1972. Apart from the time he spent studying in Copenhagen, he has always lived in the North Jutland Region. He was educated at the Frederikshavn High School, graduating in 1991. He then studied theology at the University of Copenhagen, graduating in 1999.

He was ordained priest in 1999 and served as parish priest of Elling between 1999 and 2007. He then became parish priest and church registrar in Tversted rectory in the Hjørring Municipality from 2007 until 2012. Later ne transferred to St Catharine's Church in Hjørring and retained the post until his consecration as bishop in 2021. Simultaneously, between 2015 and 2021, he was Dean of Hjørring Søndre in the Diocese of Aalborg.

He was a co-founder of the Islam-Critical Network in 2006.

Rasmussen was elected Bishop of Aalborg on 27 October 2021 on the second ballot, commenced his role of leading the diocese on 1 December 2021, and was consecrated on 12 December 2021 in Budolfi Church. He got 52% of the votes in the episcopal election.
