= Vestervig =

Village in Denmark

- Village
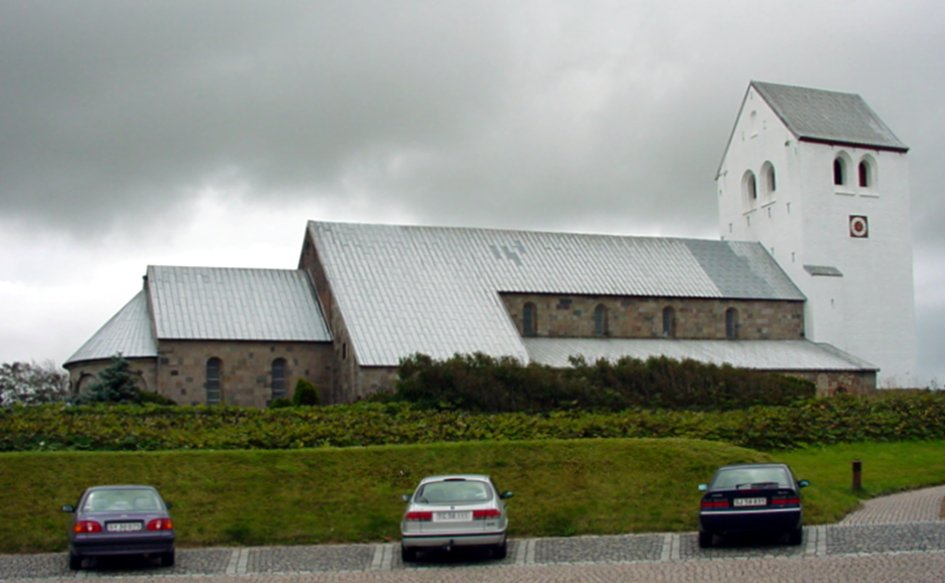
- Vestervig Church

- Location in North Jutland Region Vestervig (Denmark)
- Coordinates: 56°45′45″N 8°19′06″E
- Country: Denmark
- Region: North Jutland Region
- Municipality: Thisted

Population (2026)
  - Total: 555
- Time zone: UTC+1 (CET)
  - Summer (DST): UTC+2 (CEST)

Vestervig is a village in Vestervig Parish in Denmark, located in Thisted municipality in North Denmark Region (until December 31, 2006; Sydthy municipality, Viborg County). Vestervig has a population of 555 (1 January 2026). It has a disproportionately large church, Vestervig Abbey, which served as a cathedral until 1130 when the see was transferred to Børglum.

== Climate ==
Climate data for Vestervig (1981–2010)
Month	Jan	Feb	Mar	Apr	May	Jun	Jul	Aug	Sep	Oct	Nov	Dec	Year
Record high °C (°F)	10.6 (51.1)	9.9 (49.8)	17.0 (62.6)	25.5 (77.9)	29.5 (85.1)	30.1 (86.2)	35.3 (95.5)	31.4 (88.5)	27.9 (82.2)	20.3 (68.5)	15.3 (59.5)	11.9 (53.4)	35.3 (95.5)
Mean daily maximum °C (°F)	3.6 (38.5)	3.6 (38.5)	5.8 (42.4)	10.3 (50.5)	14.9 (58.8)	17.5 (63.5)	20.1 (68.2)	20.1 (68.2)	16.5 (61.7)	12.2 (54.0)	7.6 (45.7)	4.7 (40.5)	11.4 (52.5)
Daily mean °C (°F)	1.7 (35.1)	1.5 (34.7)	3.1 (37.6)	6.7 (44.1)	10.9 (51.6)	13.7 (56.7)	16.1 (61.0)	16.3 (61.3)	13.2 (55.8)	9.5 (49.1)	5.5 (41.9)	2.8 (37.0)	8.4 (47.1)
Mean daily minimum °C (°F)	−0.7 (30.7)	−1 (30)	0.6 (33.1)	3.4 (38.1)	7.3 (45.1)	10.4 (50.7)	12.8 (55.0)	13.0 (55.4)	10.3 (50.5)	6.7 (44.1)	3.1 (37.6)	0.3 (32.5)	5.5 (41.9)
Record low °C (°F)	−25.0 (−13.0)	−16.4 (2.5)	−14.9 (5.2)	−4.6 (23.7)	−0.6 (30.9)	2.5 (36.5)	4.4 (39.9)	4.4 (39.9)	−0.3 (31.5)	−4.9 (23.2)	−10.0 (14.0)	−17.6 (0.3)	−25.0 (−13.0)
Average precipitation mm (inches)	72.6 (2.86)	52.9 (2.08)	55.9 (2.20)	38.4 (1.51)	45.9 (1.81)	52.6 (2.07)	51.4 (2.02)	80.2 (3.16)	85.3 (3.36)	102.6 (4.04)	84.2 (3.31)	80.9 (3.19)	802.8 (31.61)
Source: Danish Meteorological Institute

== Notable people ==
- Theodgar of Vestervig (died in or about 1065) a missionary from Thuringia who worked mostly in Jutland where he died and is venerated as a saint
- Joachim Irgens von Vestervig (1611-1675), Baron of Vestervig, Dano-Norwegian official and estate owner, one of the most important financial magnates and entrepreneurs
- Peter von Scholten (1784 in Vestervig – 1854), Governor-General of the Danish West Indies
- Per Pedersen (born 1964 in Vestervig) a retired road bicycle racer from 1986 to 1993
