= Henning Toft Bro =

Danish prelate

The Right Reverend Henning Toft Bro
- Bishop of Aalborg
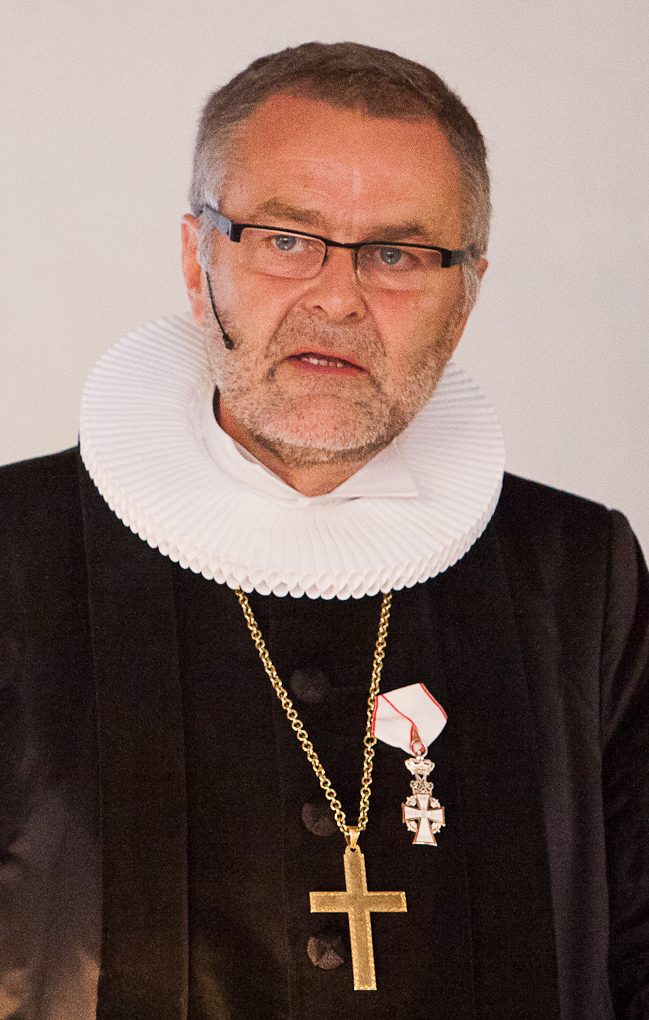
- Church: Church of Denmark
- Diocese: Aalborg
- Elected: 2010
- In office: 2010-2021
- Predecessor: Søren Lodberg Hvas
- Successor: Thomas Reinholdt Rasmussen

Orders
- Ordination: 1985
- Consecration: 9 May 2010

Personal details
- Born: 23 October 1956 (age 69) Thyborøn, Denmark
- Denomination: Lutheran
- Spouse: Ragna Bro
- Children: 3
- Education: Aarhus University

Henning Toft Bro is a Danish prelate who served as the Bishop of Aalborg, Denmark from 2010 until 2021.

== Education ==
After graduation, Toft Bro went to the sea where he worked as a fisherman. Afterwards he was a port worker at the harbor in Thyborøn. A year and a half later he went to Nørre Nissum to study at the Nørre Nissum Seminarium and HF. After he went to Aarhus University to study theology. Here he became a graduate of cand.theol in the spring of 1985.

== Priesthood ==
His first position as parish priest started on 1 September 1985 when he was assigned to Hjerm Sogn parish in Struer. Twenty years later, Toft was appointed as a priest in Nykøbing Mors Sogn in 1997. He remained in this post until spring 2010. In 2004 he became Knight of Dannebrog.

During the 2010 election for a new Bishop of Aalborg, Toft Bro went through a two-stage election where his last rival was Marianne Christiansen. Toft Bro received 970 votes out of the 1,796 votes counted. On 9 May 2010 Toft Bro was given the position as the 58th Bishop of Aalborg in Aalborg Cathedral.

== Music ==
Henning Toft Bro was a member of the band Tørfisk from 1983 to 1995 and has participated in many of the band's musical albums. Bent Bro is one of the founders of Tørfisk in 1981 . It was Henning Toft who wrote the group's big hit " VLTJ ". He has also published solo projects with hymns and shows, just as he has written teaching and service material.
