= Johanne Andersdatter Sappi =

15th Century Danish noblewoman

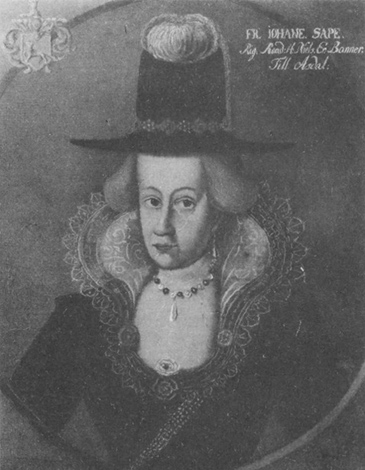
Johanne Andersdatter, Posthumous portrait, 16th or 17th century

Johanne Andersdatter Sappi (died 1479), was a Danish noble and landholder, known as "Fru Johanne af Asdal" (Lady Johanne of Asdal). She became a well-known figure in the folklore of her country and the subject of folk songs and legend. According to traditional legend, she was a part of the council of state.

Johanne Andersdatter Sappi was the daughter of Anders Nielsen til Asdal and Ide Lydersdatter and the heir of one of the most powerful noble clans of Denmark. She first married the son of the chamberlain Bonde Due til Torp, who according to legend had her abducted. Widowed in 1430, she remarried Niels Eriksen til Vinstrup (d. 1447), by which she became the ancestral mother of the noble house Banner. She had four children during her first marriage, and fourteen during her second.

By her wealth and her lands, as well as her personal qualities, she occupied a central place in the Danish nobility. The traditional legend that she was even given a place in the council of state, the riksråd, because of it is, however, not considered likely. However, in a document from 1462, she was given rank before the Bishop of Børglum, and mentioned as the bearer of the office Høvedsmand of Vendsyssel.

She was a benefactor of Dueholm Abbey, where she died in 1479 and was buried.
