= Vestervig Abbey =

Church building in Thisted Municipality, Denmark

Coordinates: 56.7732°N 8.3172°E

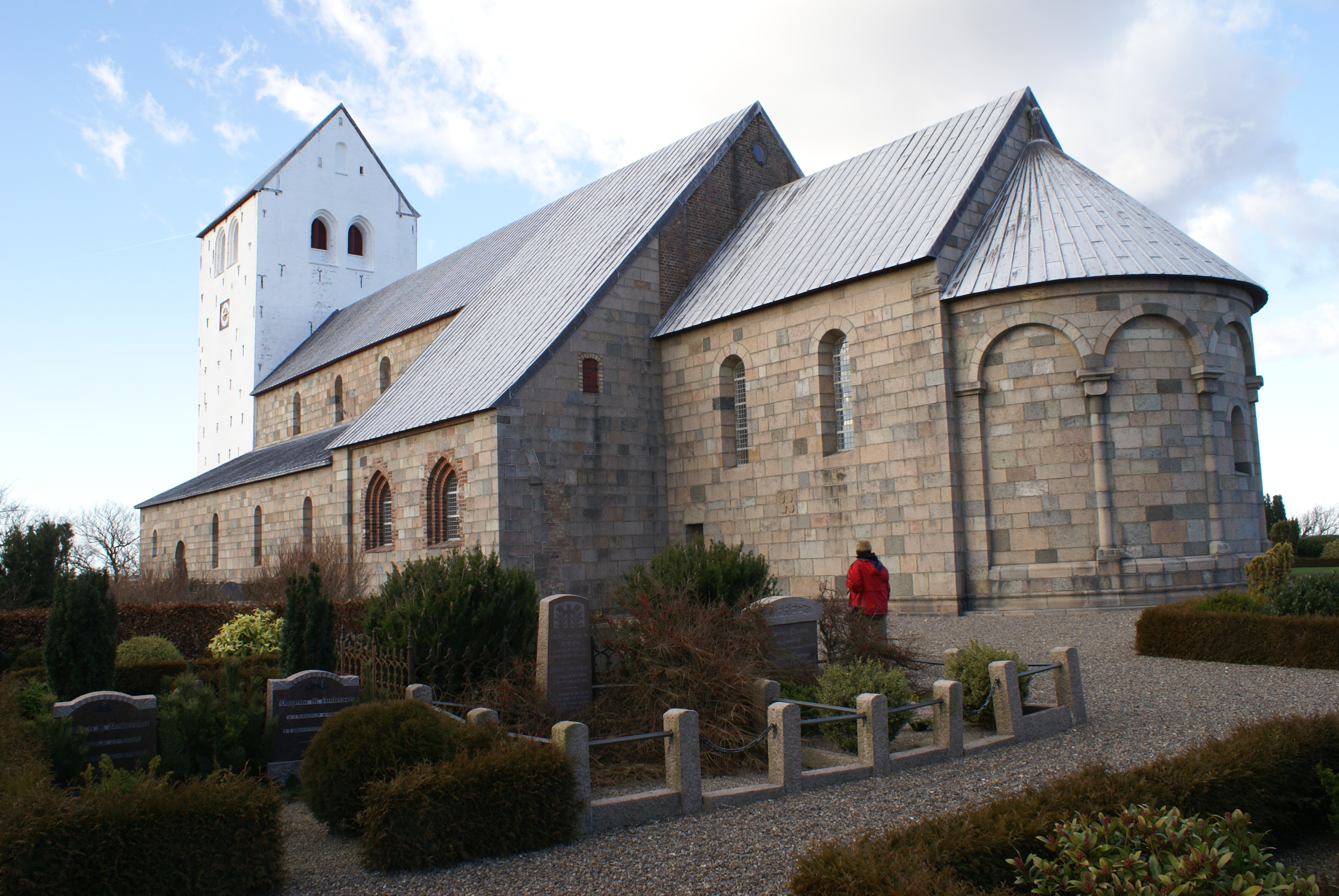
Vestervig Abbey

Vestervig Abbey, also known as Vestervig Church, was established in about 1059 making it one of Denmark's most ancient religious houses. The abbey is located at Vestervig, Thisted on Vendsyssel-Thy.

== History ==
Vestervig is located inside the Limfjord near the west coast where the Limfjord meets the North Sea. There are many bays (Danish:vig) which branch off the main channel of the Limfjord. Vestervig was an important trading location in Viking times.

About 1030 Saint Thøger settled at Vestervig and built the first wattle and clay church in Thy (now Thisted County). Thøger (or Theodgar) was a Thuringian missionary who had been living in England when Olaf II went there on a Viking expedition. Thøger's wonderful sermons brought an invitation to return to Norway with Olav as his personal chaplain. He had, even as a young man, a reputation for being able to heal the sick. He became a personal advisor to Olaf II. When Olaf was driven from Norway in 1028, Thøger went with the king eastward into Sweden and as far as Kiev. Olaf returned to Norway in 1030, raised an army and tried to take the throne again. He was killed at the Battle of Stiklestad 29 July 1030. Olaf was locally canonized as Saint Olaf. Thøger fled Norway and settled at Vestervig. He began to teach the local people about Christianity without much success.

One night he slept on the ground at the Vestervig marketplace. In the morning where his head had been, a spring began to run. The Danes counted this as miraculous and soon Thøger had his congregation. A church was built near the spring and even in the 19th century people drank water from the spring hoping to cure ailments. One did not have to visit the spring in person, if health prevented it, just to drink the water was enough.

One day Thøger visited a nearby farm called Randrupgård where he met a man standing at his doorway complaining about his bad luck with livestock. Thøger replied, "Put up the cross of Christ where here none has stood before, so will your luck improve!" Immediately a spring burst out of the ground on the spot and people flocked to it for its restorative properties. A cross was raised at the site everafter.

After his death, 24 June 1067, a delegation from Vestervig went to Bishop Albrik in Viborg to have Thøger beatified. At first the bishop was sceptical, but later was convinced and endorsed the process whereby Thøger was declared a local saint. (This was before saints were approved by the curia in Rome.) King Svend Estridsen objected since Thøger had been a close advisor to his old enemy Olav II. On 30 October 1117 Thøger's remains were moved inside the church for the veneration of the faithful. But the story doesn't end there. Thøger made one final appearance. He appeared to the priest of the church the night of his translation into the church dragging one of his legs. He explained that one of his bones had not been included in the reliquary; it was still buried in Thøger's old grave. The next morning the grave was opened and just as Thøger had said one of his leg bones had been overlooked. It was dusted off and placed inside the reliquary and Thøger didn't bother the priest again.

The abbey church and Vestervig church with the sacred spring were both dedicated to Saint Thøger and were locally important as pilgrimage sites. Thøger's fame as a healer spread far beyond Thy.

Vestervig became the seat of the Bishop of Vestervig (later Børglum) in 1059 when Vendsyssel (Jutland above the Limfjord) was created as its own diocese after the death of Bishop Val. Thøger was named the patron saint of the diocese.

The Augustinian Canons who established themselves at Vestervig no later than 1140, were instrumental in the establishment of the Børglum Abbey which later supplanted Vestervig as the seat of the diocese. They were probably immigrants from England. The western end of the Limfjord had filled in making it impossible for ships to sail through the fjord from the North Sea. International trade virtually stopped. One reason for the transfer of the see to Børglum may have been to access the coast easier.

Augustinians were not ordinary monks. They were priests who had accepted the vows of poverty, chastity, and obedience. They lived simply and their work was teaching, helping the poor and sick, preaching the word of God as well as attending services for prayer and song. Their habit was simple white with a black apron or scapular.

The Augustinians built a new church in the 13th century out of large red brick, the most common building material of the time.

Legend has it that one of the canons from Vestervig Abbey kidnapped the wife of a local farmer. The wife escaped and ran back home to tell her husband about the abduction. The farmer grabbed an axe and headed for the abbey. He found the canon at his prayers in the church and struck him a blow so hard that blood spattered across the floor of the church. Ever after the bloodstains remained on the church floor and even when the flooring was torn up and replaced the stains appeared in times of trouble for the region.

There was a nunnery at Kappel near Vestervig Abbey, and rumor had it that the monks built a tunnel that ran from the abbey to the nunnery, so that the canons could move back and forth without being seen. Local histories cite claims of brick work found under fields between the abbey and Kappel as evidence for the tunnel, but no serious excavations have been undertaken to prove or disprove the old story.

== Reformation in Denmark ==
The abbey was dissolved in 1536 when Denmark became officially Lutheran. The monks either put off their habits and became local residents or left the country, perhaps south into Germany. The abbey became crown property and the properties which over the years had become part of the abbey estate were sold or given away. Several land owners purchased or inherited the property from that time.

Most of the abbey was destroyed by a fire in 1703. The story goes that a ship stranded on the coast Christmas Eve and Peder de Moldrup/Mollerup, the miserly owner of the buildings of the abbey, received most of the salvage from the wreck. As valuables were forcibly taken from the captain, he blurted out "if our Christmas Eve is so terrible, then your New Year's Eve shall be worse." A store of paper found on the beach was hung out in the loft to dry. Moldrup's wife went to check on it on New Year's Eve, and the flame from the candle set the paper alight and the old abbey buildings, except the church, went up in flames. The sea captain's prophecy fulfilled.

After the destruction of St. Thøger's Church in 1752, the abbey church became the parish church for the town of Vestervig. The church tower has two bells still in use from the abbey days: one cast in 1513 by Sven Andersen and the other cast by an unknown bell maker from the 15th century.

== Sources ==
- Ancient See of Børglum
- Vestervig Kirke (in Danish)
- Vestervig Folkesagn Søgård, Knud (in Danish)
