= Islam-Critical Network =

The Islam-Critical Network (Danish: Islamkritisk Netværk) was a network of priests and theologians in the Church of Denmark which stated that Muslims and Christians do not believe in the same God, and rejected interfaith collaboration with imams and mosques. The network consisted of around 120 priests and theologians, including Niels Højlund, Sørine Gotfredsen, Edith Thingstrup and Morten Kvist, as well as the two former bishops Herluf Eriksen and Johannes Johansen. It was founded amid the Jyllands-Posten Muhammad cartoons controversy in May 2006, and was initiated by Katrine Winkel Holm and Thomas Reinholdt Rasmussen, who presented the network in an article in Kristeligt Dagblad. At its first public meeting in September 2006, the network agreed to be structured as loosely as possible. The network hosted a website collecting articles published by its members, which was last posted to in 2012.
