= Dueholm Priory =

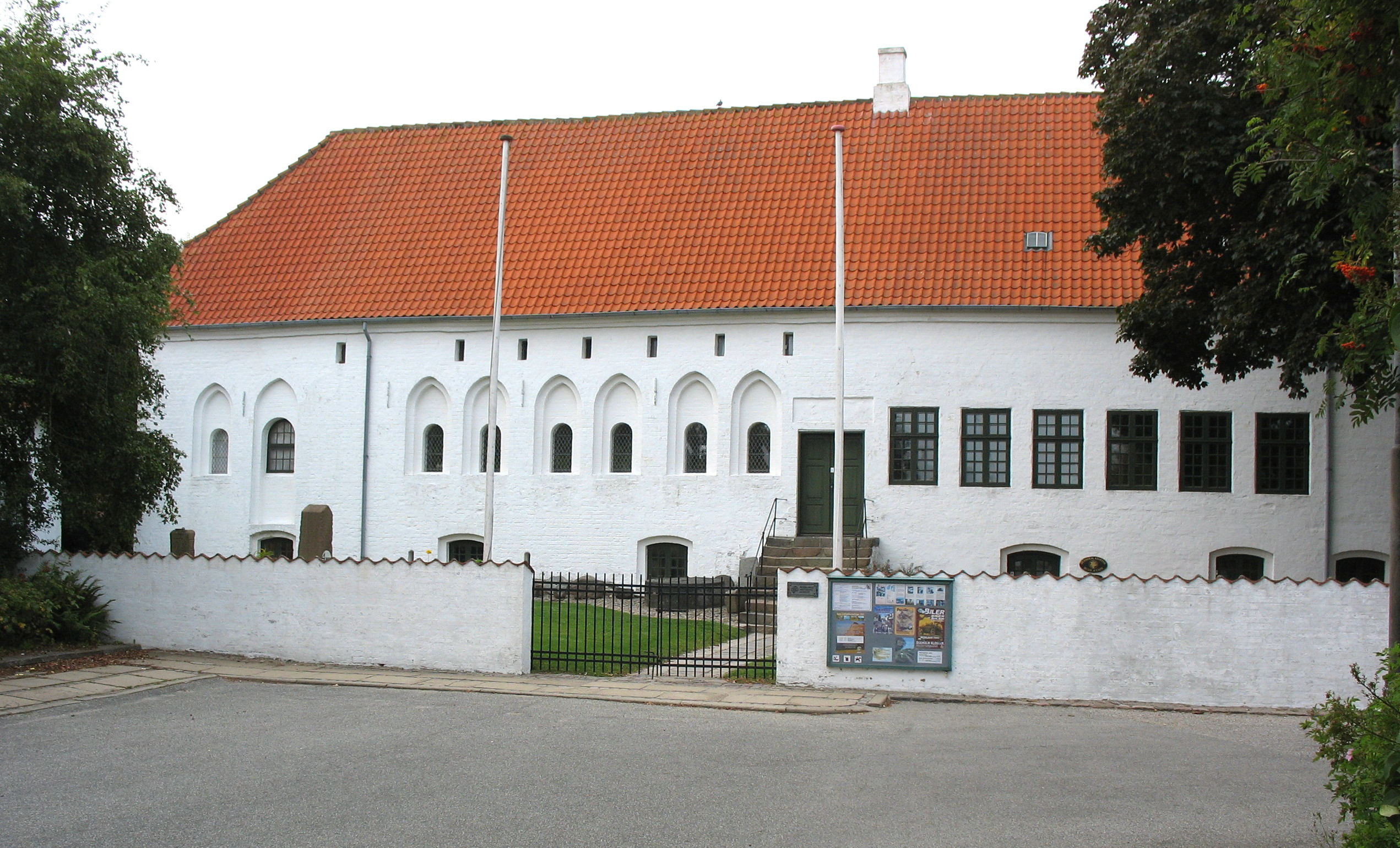
- The former Dueholm monastery, now part of the Morsland Historical Museum

- Location within Denmark Location within North Jutland Region
- Interactive map of Dueholm Priory

Monastery information
- Established: 1370
- Disestablished: 1556
- Diocese: Børglum

People
- Founder: Bishop Sven

Site
- Location: Nykøbing, Mors
- Country: Denmark
- Coordinates: 56.7947°N 8.8532°E
- Visible remains: West range, remnant walls and foundations
- Public access: yes

Dueholm Priory was a monastery of the Knights of Malta, also known as the Knights Hospitaller, located at Nykøbing on the island of Mors in northern Denmark.

== History ==
Dueholm Priory was founded in 1370 by Bishop Sven of Børglum, the diocese of northernmost Jutland at the time. It lay just outside the town of Nykøbing. The priory was dedicated to St John the Baptist and Mary Magdalene. The property on which it was later built had been given to the diocese by Lady Mette Pedersdatter before 1370. In 1380 the Hospitallers were given the rights to St Clement's Church in Nykøbing.

At its height in the early 16th century the priory consisted of twelve brother priests led by a prior, who was often a secular nobleman who served as advocate in worldly matters. The hospital was operated by brothers of the order who were not monks, but living a religious life in conjunction with their service at the hospital. One detail that becomes evident from Dueholm's archive letters is that the population of the priory was quite transitory. Noble families often placed younger sons at Dueholm for a time. Upon their majority they either left the monastery to marry or go to war, join the lay brothers in the hospital, or apply to become knight-monks and enter the priesthood. Dueholm had a school that stood between the mill and the town that was the second school, the first had been built during the reign of Christian II.

Dueholm also oversaw St Jørgen's Leper House outside Nykøbing, though it was a separate institution with its own staff of lay brothers who specialized in the treatment of the lepers. The knight-priests of St John took turns saying mass each day there.

Dueholm Priory had a long struggle with the town over Holy Ghost Hospital, which was established by the citizens of the town for the care of the poor and sick, and manned by lay brothers of the Order of the Holy Ghost who lived a religious life of service at the hospital. The argument with the Hospitallers came when in 1445 Christopher of Bavaria, King of Denmark, recognized the town's rights to the hospital property which they had built. The priory had obtained a papal bull which granted them permission to finish Holy Ghost Chapel at Holy Ghost Hospital in St Clements parish. The arguments came down to control of income for the hospital and who actually had rights to it. Bishop Gert stood solidly in Dueholm's corner forbidding laymen or helpers from receiving benefit of donations to the hospital. The dispute grew so hot that Christian I stepped in to order that the parish priest at St Clemens was not to be prohibited from saying mass in the hospital chapel, thereby giving St Hans Priory, who chose the priest for the parish church, spiritual control over the hospital. St Hans Priory triumphantly took over Holy Ghost Hospital from the town. In time the priory came to own many properties in the town and in the surrounding area.

Unlike many contemporary monastic houses, parts of Dueholm's archives have been preserved in two 'letter books'. The older collection was copied before 1527 with letters covering the period from 1371 to 1539. The copies were made of letters in deteriorating condition for future reference. The 1370 foundation grant from Bishop Sven is included, one of few such documents. Often the founding grants documents were confiscated when monasteries were closed in the 1520s and 1530s. The 'younger' letter book was copied in 1527. It contains among other letters, the list of arrivals to the priory and the places from which they came. A 1591 inventory of the archive lists a host of documents still in existence after the closure of the priory. There is also an inventory of Trinity Chapel's Archive. The two books fell into the possession of 'the honorable and well-born lady Elle Krastrup, the widow of Thygge Sandberg of Kvelstrup and were preserved by her and then after 1587 passed on to the local magistrate. The letter books were recopied in the 18th century and passed on to government officials for their value in determining land ownership. Unfortunately, the entire archive from Dueholm was moved to Dueholm Castle where it went up in flames in the sack of the castle in 1627. The two surviving Dueholm letters provide glimpses into the everyday life of medieval monks and the surrounding community.

In 1527 St Jørgens House was closed and torn down including its chapel. Its mill became known afterwards as St Hans Mill for the 'Johanitter', the nickname for the Hospitallers. In 1528 the old argument about Holy Ghost Hospital surfaced again when the town wrote to Frederick I, a reform-minded monarch about the pope's unlawful gift of the hospital to the priory accusing the order of not helping the poor and sick at the hospital as they should.

The Reformation in Denmark brought an end to all religious houses, though changes in belief and practice came later to the north of Jutland. But in 1536 Dueholm Priory and its income properties reverted to the crown. Since the main work of the brothers was to run the town hospitals, citizens had an interest in the continuance of medical services. The priory was simply secularized and the work of the hospitals continued. At the death of the last secular prior, Jakob Jensen in 1556, the priory was disbanded though the work of the hospitals continued.

When Thisted county was organized, the priory buildings were converted into a manor house for the local magistrate. Over time the manor estate was broken into smaller holdings. By 1901 only the west range of the former priory was preserved with some of its Gothic arched windows intact.

Dueholm's Priory's west range was restored and today houses the Morslande Historiske Museum. There are several other remnants of walls and foundations which have been incorporated into other buildings.

== See also ==
- Johanne Andersdatter Sappi (died 1479), benefactor of the Priory

== Sources ==
- 'Dueholm Kloster'. Salmonsens Konversationalexikon. p486 (in Danish)
- 'Dueholms Diplomatarium Samling 1347-1539'. (in Danish)
