= Børglum Abbey =

Premonstratensian abbey of medieval Denmark

Coordinates: 57°22′08″N 9°47′57″E

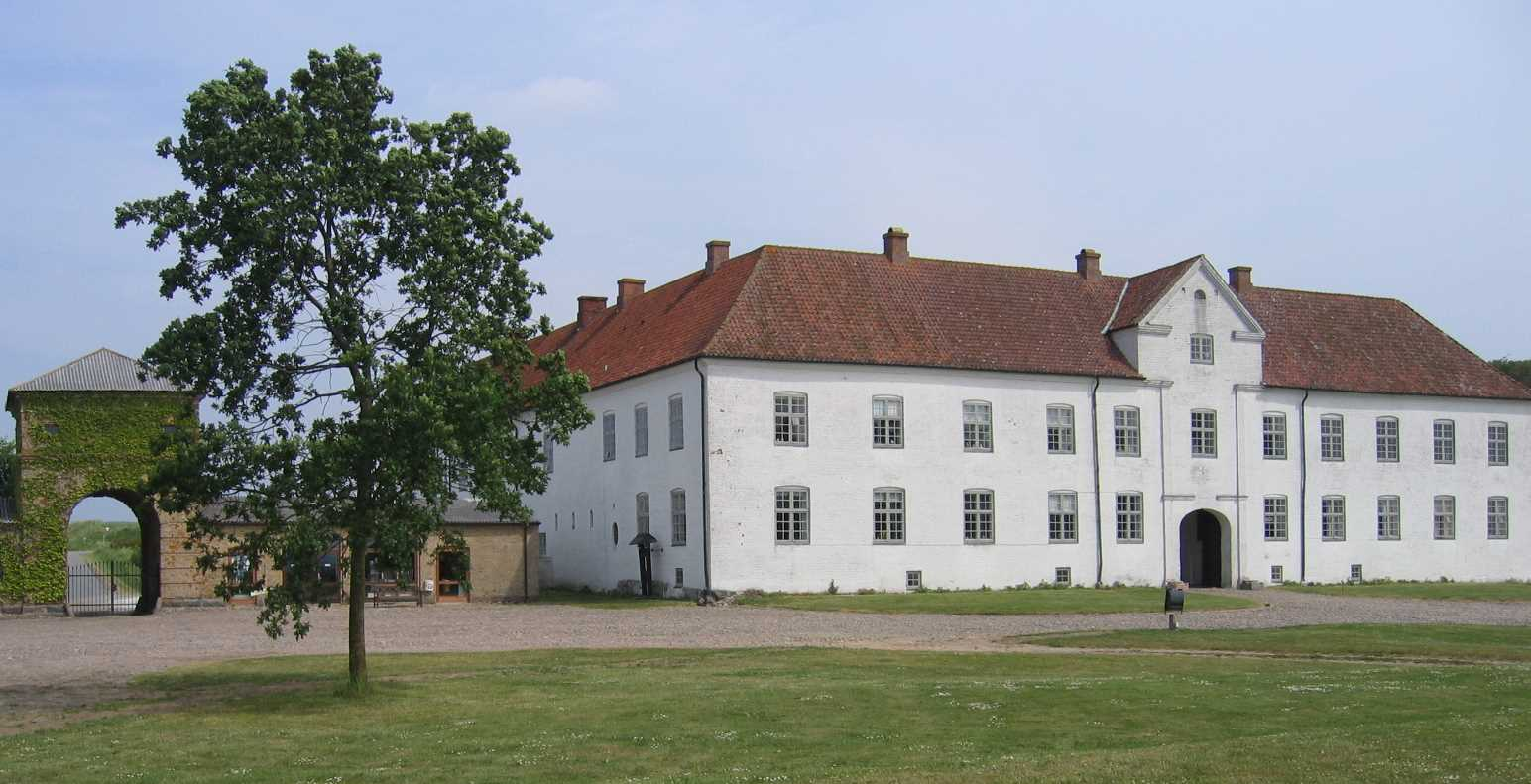
Børglum Abbey

Børglum Abbey was an important Premonstratensian abbey of medieval Denmark, located in Børglum parish, in the commune of Hjørring, approximately five kilometers east of Løkken in north central Jutland (Region Nordjylland) from the 12th century until reformation.

== History ==
=== Origin ===
Børglum Abbey was originally a royal farm (Danish: gård) which dated back as far as 1000, if not earlier. In 1086 King Canute IV fled from his residence at Børglum when the peasants revolted against him. The royal residence was burned to the ground but rebuilt sometime later.

At some point between 1134 and 1139, the royal estate at Børglum was granted to the church to become the new seat of the bishopric of northern Jutland, also known as the bishopric of Vendsyssel, previously established at Vestervig. Bishop Self (or Sylvester) of Vestervig became the first bishop of Børglum (Vendsyssel) in 1139, and Børglum remained the seat of the diocese until the Reformation.

It is unclear exactly who first established a monastery there, but it seems possible that the Augustinians previously settled at Vestervig had moved to Børglum by 1134.

=== Premonstratensians ===
In the 1180s the Premonstratensians, or White Canons, were established here, as a daughter house of Steinfeld Abbey near Cologne in Germany. Børglum then in its turn became the mother house for all Premonstratensian monasteries in Scandinavia. The abbey quickly became prominent, perhaps with the help of royal patronage, and set up a seminary, where many noble families sent at least one of their sons to study. The Premonstratensians expanded the abbey and its church during the time of Bishop Troel.

=== Bishopric ===
Some time before 1220 the bishop of Vendsyssel made the abbey his episcopal seat. The abbey church became the cathedral of the bishopric of Vendsyssel, or Børglum, and the canons took on the additional role of the cathedral chapter. Besides being the biggest landowner in North Jutland, the bishop was ex officio part of the State Council which advised the King of Denmark on domestic and international policy. This further enhanced the reputation of Børglum Abbey, making it one of the most influential religious houses in Denmark.

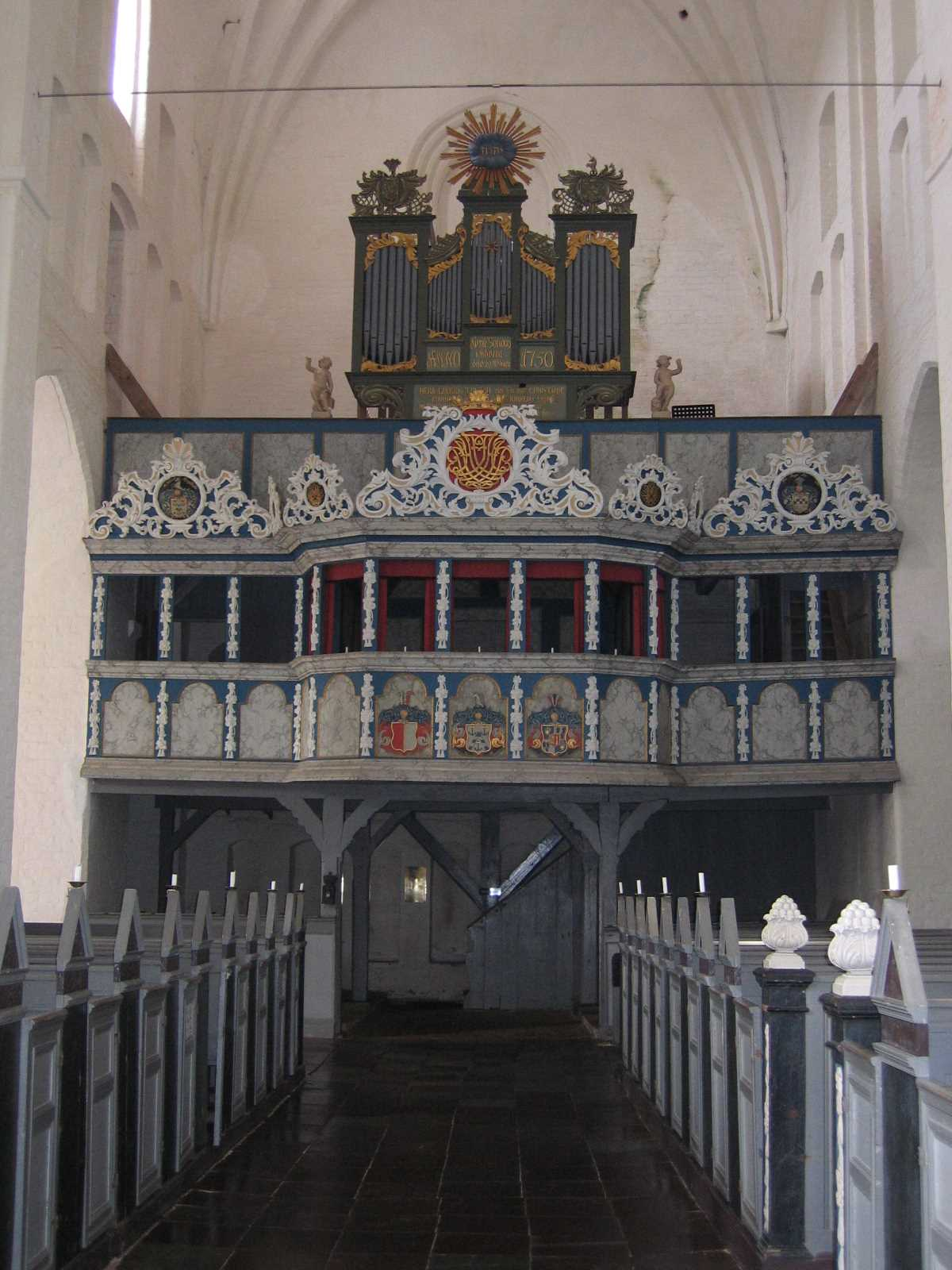
Abbey church, interior: organ

The abbey church, later also cathedral, was built as a typical Romanesque basilica and formed the eastern range of the monastery. It is believed that the builders modelled its construction and decoration on Viborg Cathedral. It was built of granite, obtained locally. A flat timber ceiling and the absence of windows would have made it dark, but the massive walls would have prevented the cold winds and storms off the North Sea, just a few miles to the west, from penetrating the building.

Hans Christian Andersen wrote a version of the old folk legend 'The Bishop of Borglum and his Men' which recounts the murder of Bishop of Borglum, Oluf Glob, and several companions by his nephew, Jens Glob, in front of the altar at Hvidebjerg Church on Thy Island in 1206.

There are several exchanges of letters between the bishop of Vendsyssel and several popes regarding the white woollen habit that was the required dress for Premonstratensian canons. In May 1403, Pope Boniface IX gave dispensation to the canons at Børglum to alter their white habits to black, brown or any other dark color, due to the abbey's "being a place near the sea with frequent floods and the resulting mud." In 1422 the canons were permitted to wear undergarments for warmth and to add a cowl to their attire.

One of the annual events for which Børglum was famous was the market on or near St. Bodil's day, June 17. Bodil's sacred spring which was a religious site back in Viking times was believed to have healing power. In 1500 a fire destroyed much of the old abbey church and a new church was begun, but in the later Gothic style with high arched ceilings. Work was slow, but by 1520 the choir and nave had been rebuilt and work had begun on the transepts to join the two together. The Reformation in the 1520s and 1530s brought the reconstruction to a halt.

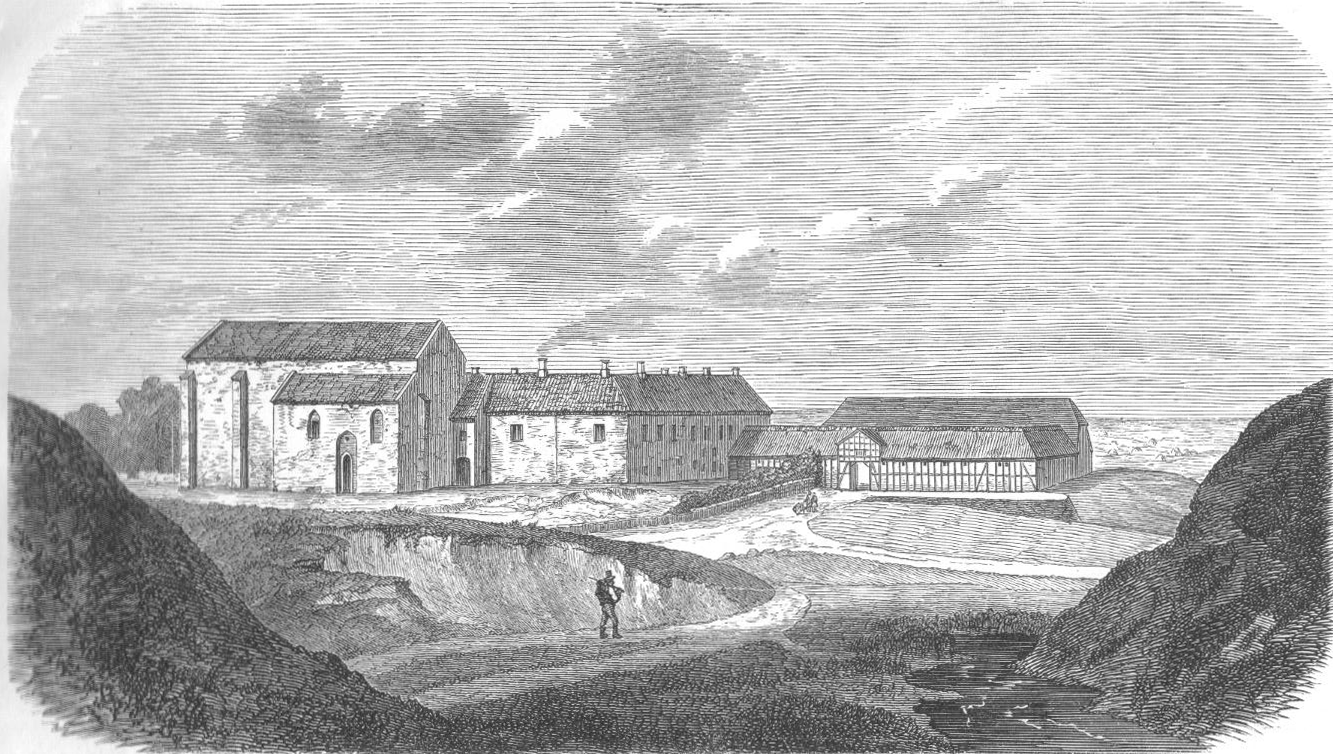
Abbey, 1897

The last bishop of Vendsyssel (and abbot of Børglum) was Stygge Krumpen, who was unable to halt the advance of the Lutheran reforms. In 1536 he was arrested and imprisoned but after several years in confinement was eventually released when he accepted Lutheranism and agreed to marry. He was given the former nunnery of Asmild Abbey, near Viborg, as an estate, on the condition that he make provision for the care of the nuns who after its dissolution in 1536 had no other place to go.

=== After dissolution ===
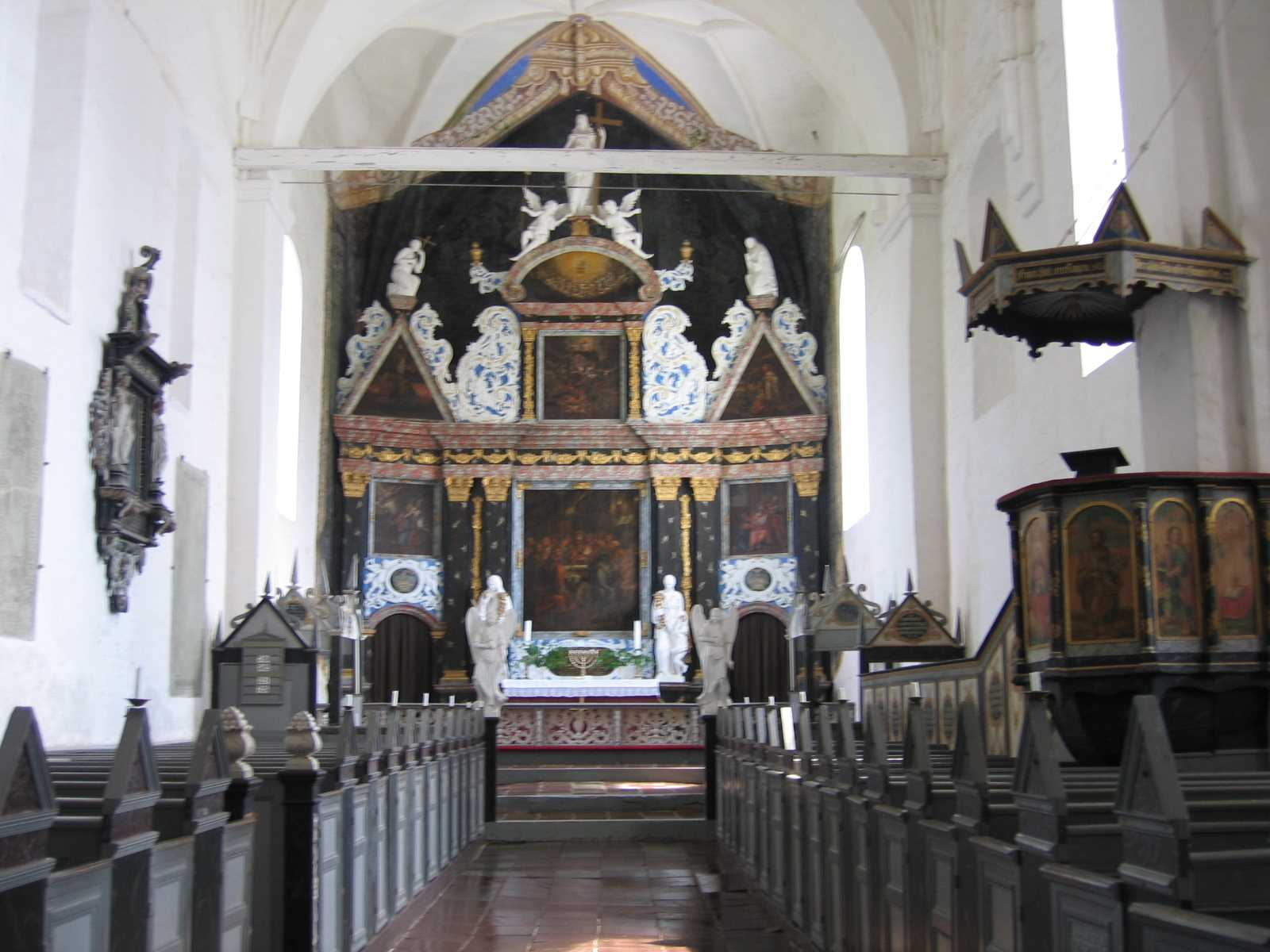
Abbey church interior

Børglum Abbey was dissolved when Denmark became officially Lutheran on 30 October 1536. Its assets reverted to the crown and it became a royal property once again. The abbey church continued in use as the cathedral church for northern Jutland until 1554, when the Lutheran bishop moved the episcopal seat to the Budolfi Church in Aalborg. The vast Børglum Abbey estate was broken up and sold off or given to noble families. The abbey's main building became a large manor house and the outbuildings were either demolished or converted to farm use.

In 1764, a Colonel Poulsen residing at Børglum Abbey was the recipient of what might be the first known mail bomb in history. The affair is mentioned in the 18th-century diary of Danish official and historian Bolle Willum Luxdorph. The entry for January 19, 1764, notes that a box was sent by mail, containing gunpowder and a firelock which set fire to it, severely injuring the colonel. He survived but on February 15 got a letter in German, saying that "soon the dose will be increased." The perpetrator was never found.

Without constant attention the buildings began to deteriorate; the church especially fell into total disrepair. A local nobleman, Godslev Budde, received permission from Frederik II to demolish the incomplete transepts and enclose the church in the original basilica form.

== Present day ==
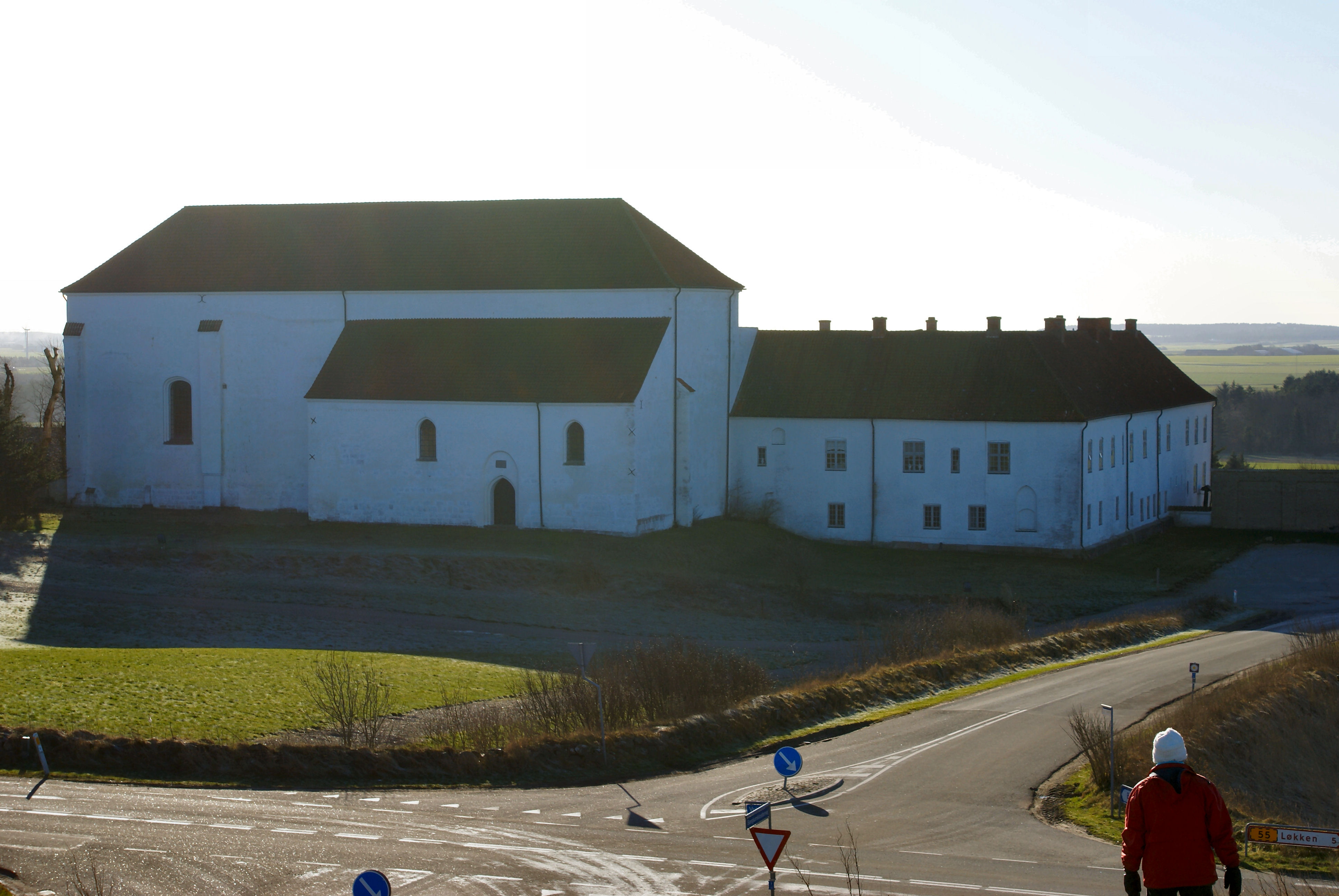
Børglum Abbey

As a manor house, the former abbey buildings at Børglum have survived to modern times. In 1958 the structures were given national historic status and protection. The remains of the abbey buildings now accommodate a museum showing the history of the site.

The church continues to serve as the local parish church. Børglum displays a modern copy of the Bayeux Tapestry.

The Børglum River in North Greenland was named after the abbey by Arctic explorer Lauge Koch in 1938.

== Sources ==
- Børglum Abbey website (in English)
- Diplomatarium Danicum (in Danish)
