= Diocese of Aalborg =

Coordinates: 57°2′17.5″N 9°53′11.3″E

Diocese of Aalborg Aalborg Stift
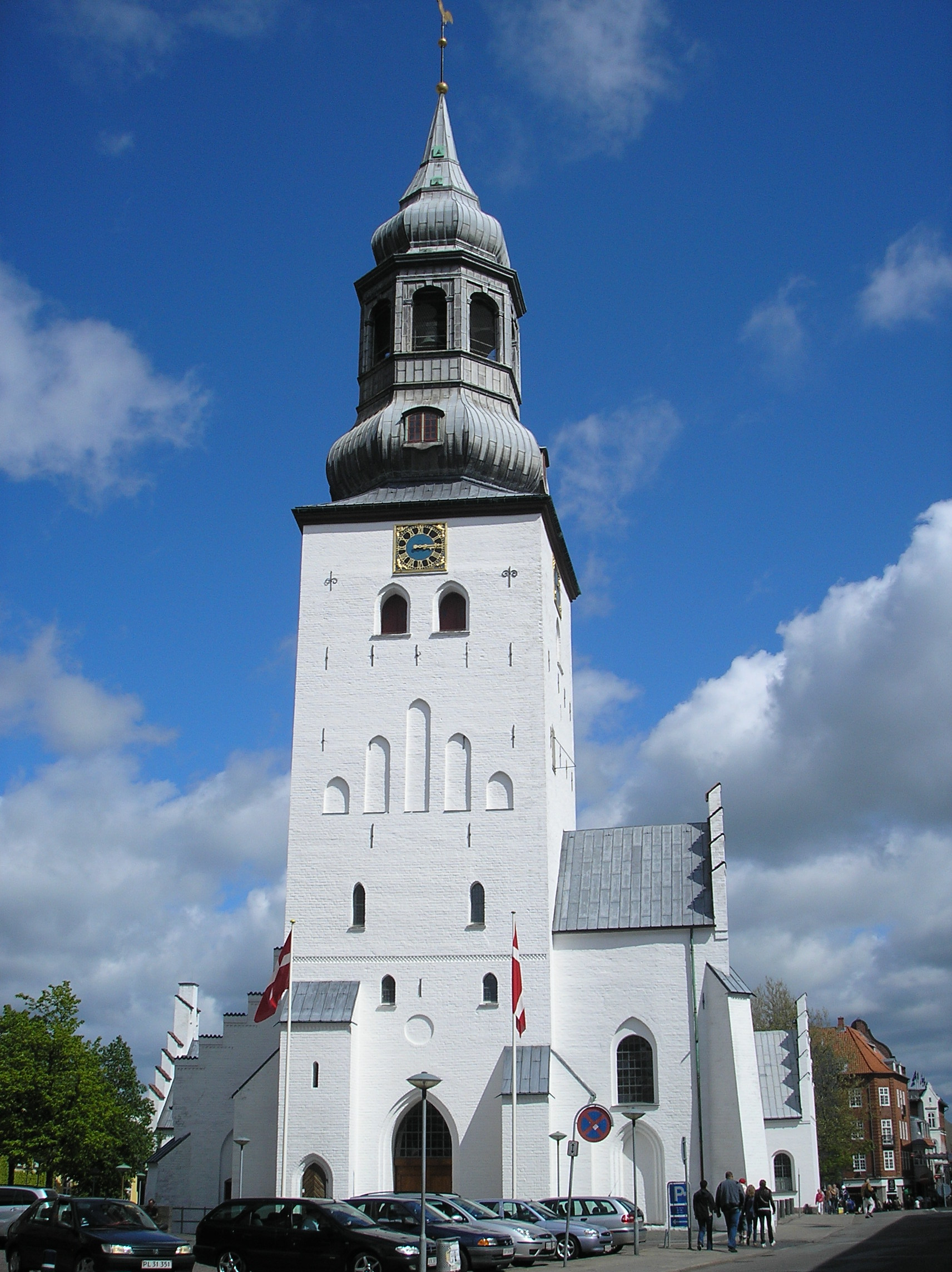
- The Cathedral of the diocese.

Location
- Country: Denmark
- Deaneries: 14

Statistics
- Population: Total: (as of 2020); 529,469
- Parishes: 296
- Churches: 330
- Members: 437,982 (82.7%)

Information
- Denomination: Church of Denmark
- Sui iuris church: Latin Church
- Established: 1554
- Cathedral: Budolfi Cathedral of Aalborg

Current leadership
- Bishop: Thomas Reinholdt Rasmussen

Website
- http://aalborgstift.dk/

The Diocese of Aalborg (Danish: Aalborg Stift) is a diocese of the Church of Denmark. It was established in 1554, during the reformation. Its episcopal see is at Budolfi Cathedral and Thomas Reinholdt Rasmussen has been the diocese's bishop since 2021.

== History ==
The diocese was founded during the Reformation and effectively replaced the former catholic Diocese of Børglum. From Børglum, the episcopal see was initially moved to Nykøbing Mors, then to Thisted and Hjørring before finally relocating to Aalborg in 1554. Budolfi Cathedral then became the seat of the diocese.

== Structure ==
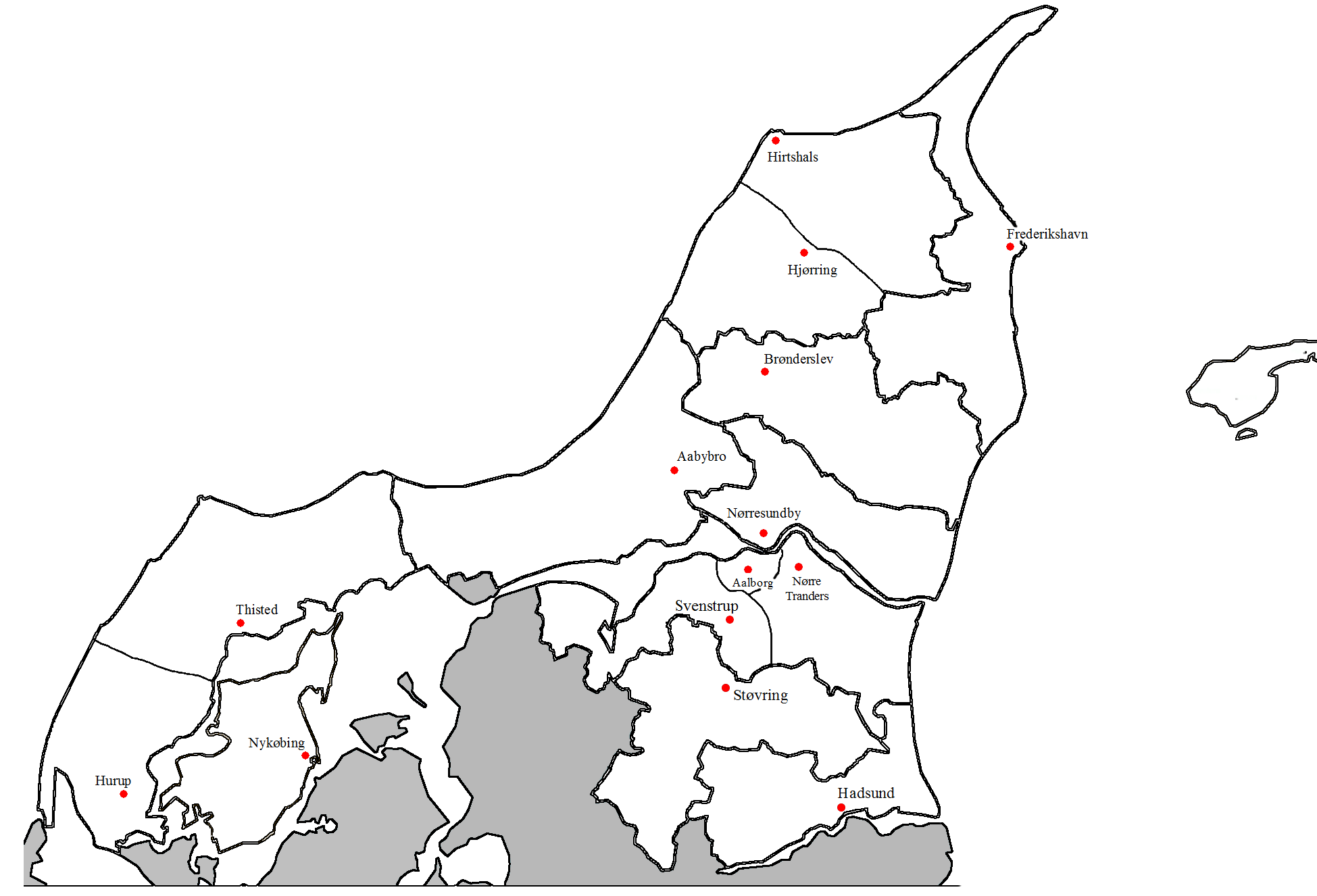
Map showing the deaneries within the Diocese of Aarhus.

The diocese comprises 14 deaneries, 296 parishes, and 330 churches.

Deaneries:

- Budolfi
- Aalborg Nordre
- Aalborg Vestre
- Aalborg Østre
- Brønderslev
- Frederikshavn
- Hadsund
- Hjørring Nordre
- Hjørring Søndre
- Jammerbugt
- Rebuild
- Sydthy
- Thisted
- Morsø

== List of Bishops ==
- Laurids Nielsen, 1554–1557
- Jørgen Mortensen Bornholm, 1557–1587
- Jacob Holm, 1587–1609
- Christen Hansen Riber, 1609–1642
- Anders Andersen Ringkjøbing, 1642–1668
- Morits Kønning, 1668–1672
- Mathias Foss, 1672–1683
- Henrik Bornemann, 1683–1693
- Jens Bircherod, 1693–1708
- Frands Thestrup, 1708–1735
- Christoffer Mumme, 1735–1737
- Broder Brorson, 1737–1778
- Christian Beverlin Studsgaard, 1778–1806
- Rasmus Jansen, 1806–1827
  - Vacant (1827–1833)
- Nikolai Fogtmann, 1833–1851
- Severin Claudius Wilken Bindesbøll, 1851–1856
- Peter Kierkegaard, 1856–1876
- Peter Engel Lind, 1875–1888
- Vilhelm Carl Schousboe, 1888–1900
- Fredrik Nielsen, 1900–1905
- Christian Møller, 1905–1915
- Christian Ludwigs, 1915–1930
- Paul Oldenbourg, 1930–1940
- D. von Huth Smith, 1940–1950
- Erik Jensen, 1950–1970
- Henrik Christiansen, 1975–1991
- Søren Lodberg Hvas, 1991–2010
- Henning Toft Bro, 2010–2021
- Thomas Reinholdt Rasmussen, 2021–present
