= Stygge Krumpen =

Stygge Krumpen (c. 1485 – 21 January 1551) was a Danish clergyman and bureaucrat, who was the secretary of king Christian II of Denmark and the last Catholic bishop of the Diocese of Børglum from 1533 to 1536, having been coadjutor bishop since 1519. He was the brother of Danish Marshal Otte Krumpen. With them, the Krumpen family died out.

== Biography ==
Stygge Krumpen was born the son of Jørgen Krumpen of Skjøtterup and Anne Styggesdatter Rosenkrantz. He was the brother of later marshal Otte Krumpen. In 1505, he started attending the University of Rostock, and took his Master's degree before 1513. In 1514, he was associated with Tranebjerg church. In 1515 he was named secretary of king Christian II of Denmark, and in 1518 he was promised the first priesthood available in Jutland.

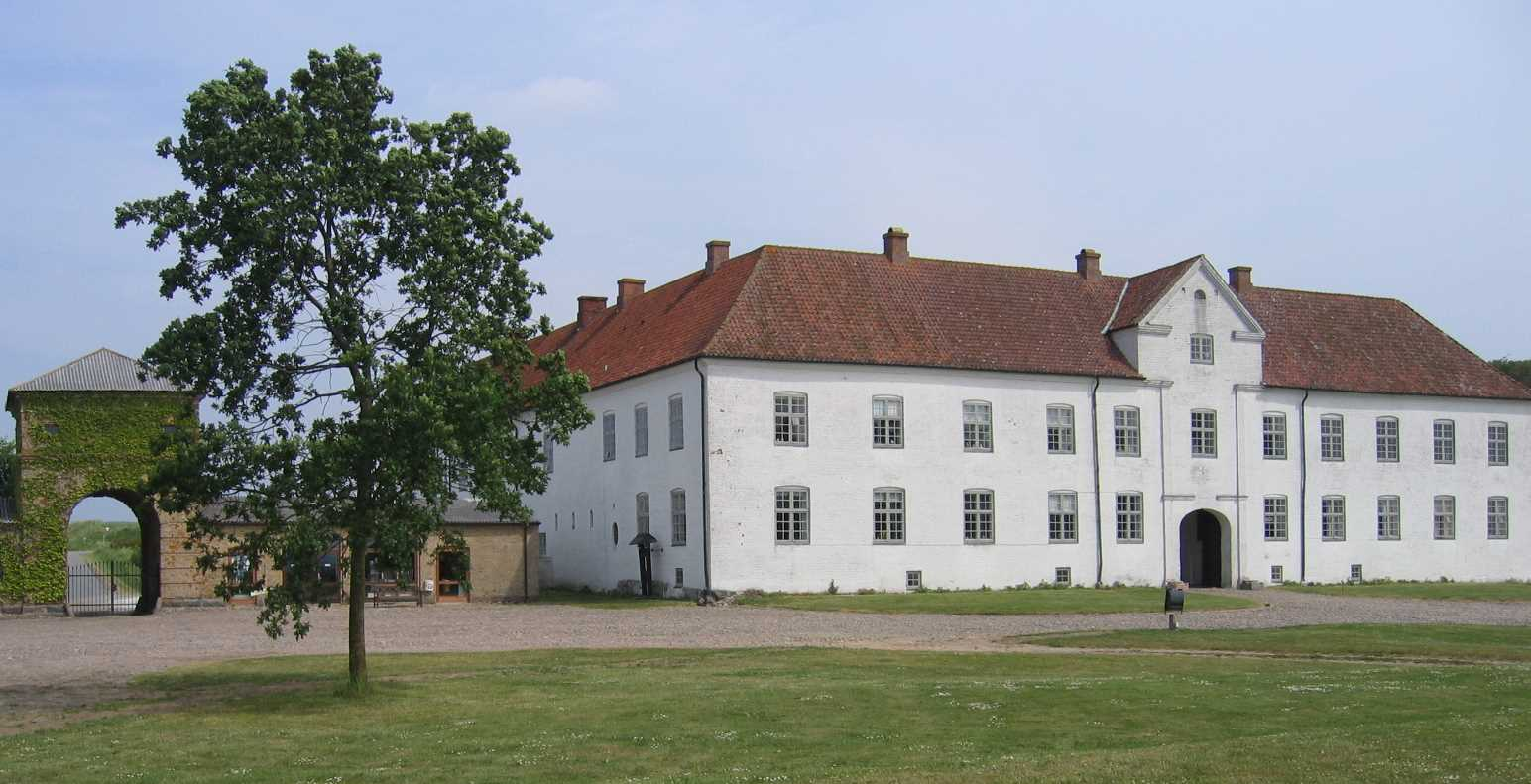
Børglum Abbey

He was named coadjutor bishop of the Diocese of Børglum in 1519 alongside his uncle, bishop Niels Stygge, and was the effective rule of the abbey. He had the provost of Børglum Abbey expelled and his rights transferred to Niels Stygge, against the will of the Holy See. Krumpen incurred the wrath of Christian II's administrator of Aalborghus Castle, opposed Christian II's right to goods from salvaged shipwrecks, and quarrelled with the Diocese of Viborg over the prerogative over Læsø. He was active in the uprising against Christian II in 1522-23.

Under new king Frederick I of Denmark, Krumpen was credited for Sæby attaining market town rights in 1524, and was named Niels Stygge's successor as provost in 1525, succeeding him in 1533. Krumpen actively opposed the Reformation in Denmark, and urged Johann Eck to preach in Denmark. While at Børglum, he sought to enhance his own land holdings in numerous ways, some of them unscrupulous. Krumpen caused public scandal as he was living in sin with his relative Elsebeth Gyldenstjerne, despite the protestations of her husband Bonde Due Munk of Voergaard Castle in Vendsyssel.

He accompanied Prince Christian on a trip to Norway in 1529, but was otherwise not a close advisor to the crown. He opposed the ascension of Prince Christian as king in 1533, and though he formally accepted him at the Election of Christian III in 1534, Krumpen remained critical of Christian III. During the subsequent Count's Feud civil war between the Protestant Christian III and the Catholic Christian II, Krumpen could not defend his holdings against the peasant uprising of Skipper Clement.

After Christian III won the Count's Feud in 1536, all Catholic bishops were dispossessed and jailed. Krumpen was imprisoned at Sønderborg Castle during the same time as Christian II. He spent his last years facing a number of legal trials regarding his conduct as a bishop. He was released in 1542 with support from his brother, after swearing allegiance to Christian III. He was granted Asmild Abbey for life in January 1543, but wielded no further political influence. He died on 21 January 1551 and was buried in the family plot at Mariager Abbey.

== Literature ==
- "Stygge Krumpen", 1936 fictional novel by Thit Jensen
- "Stygge Krumpen - biskop og adelsmand", 2008 historical biography by Gert Jensen
