= Theodgar of Vestervig =

Theodgar of Vestervig (German: Dieter von Vestervig; Danish: Thøger; also Dietger, Dioter, Theodgardus) (d. 24 June, in or about 1065) was a missionary from Thuringia who worked mostly in Jutland in Denmark, where he died and is venerated as a saint.

Theodgar studied theology in England, after which he travelled as a missionary to Norway, where King Olav II Haraldsson attached him to his court. After the king's death Theodgar left Norway and worked as a missionary on the Jutland peninsula in Denmark, where he died on 24 June in or around 1065. His remains were translated on 30 October 1117 to the church of the Augustinian Vestervig Abbey.

== Sources ==
- Nyberg, Tore, nd: Thøger (Theodgardus) in: Lexikon für Theologie und Kirche. 3rd edition, vol. 9, p. 1503 (in German)
- "Theodgar of Vestervig". Biographisch-Bibliographisches Kirchenlexikon (BBKL) (in German).
