= Asmild Abbey =

Coordinates: 56°26′49″N 9°25′30″E

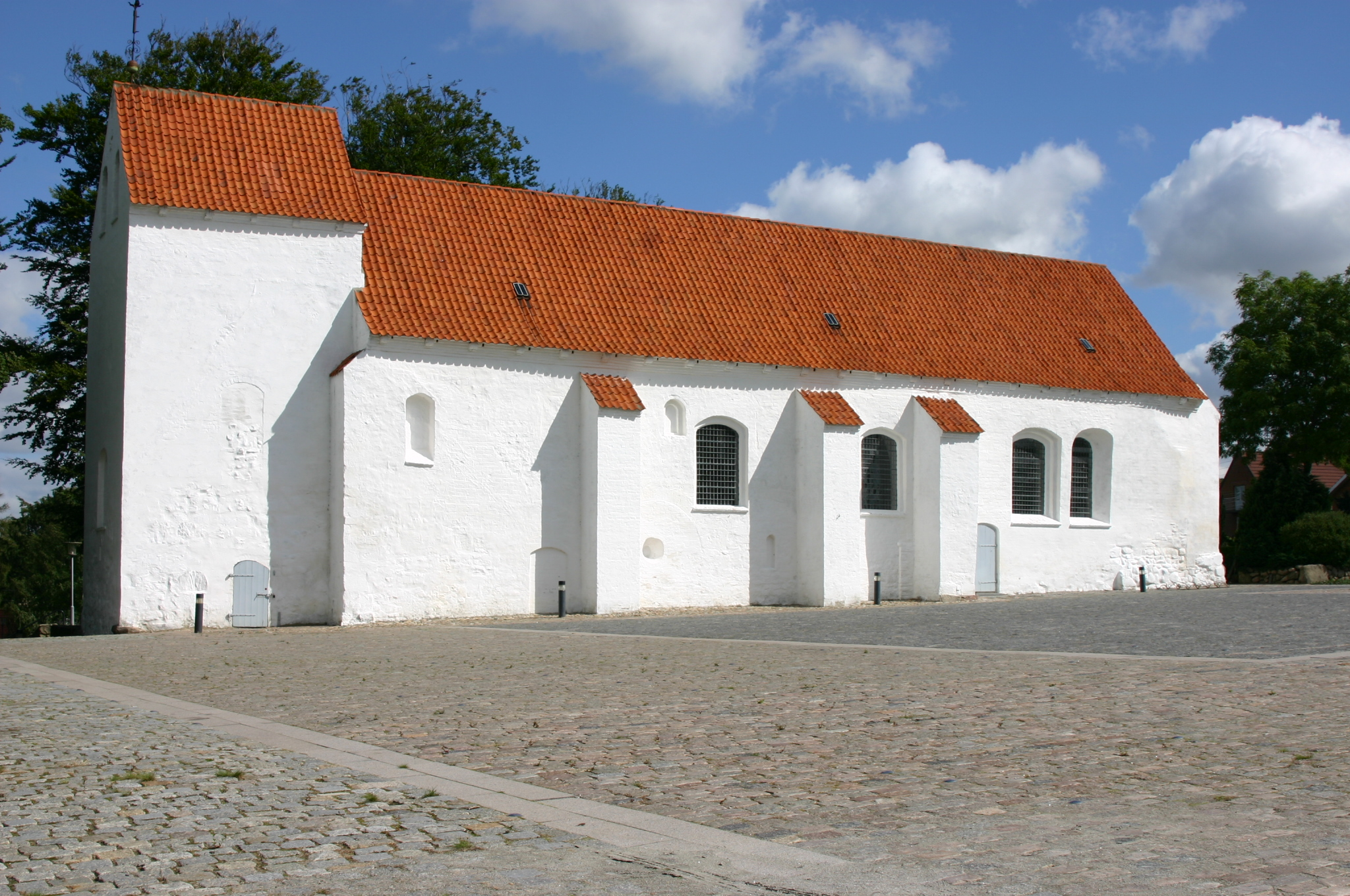
Asmild Church, originally constructed as part of the Abbey.

Asmild Abbey was a house of Augustinian canonesses with a close connection to the Augustinian canons at Viborg Cathedral in north central Jutland, Denmark from 1165 until reformation.

== History ==
The relatively large church, which predated the nunnery, had its beginnings about 1090 as a parish church dedicated to Saint Margaret of Antioch during the reign of King Olaf I of Denmark, sometimes called Olaf Hunger. It functioned as the cathedral of Viborg until the new cathedral at Viborg was finished in 1133. It was constructed of granite and limestone in the Romanesque style with rounded arches and few windows. The church was of an irregular shape with a nave, one side-aisle with an apse, and a square choir also with an apse.

The most significant event in the history of the church was the murder of Bishop Eskild of Viborg in front of the main altar of the Asmild church in 1133. The murder according to the Roskilde Chronicle was to be laid directly at the feet of King Eric II of Denmark nicknamed Erik Emune of Denmark. Bishop Eskild was a supporter of King Niels of Denmark, who was defeated and killed in the Battle of Fodevig by Erik Emune in 1134.

Construction began on Asmild Abbey in 1165 just to the south of Asmild church, which was put at the disposal of the Augustinian nuns. The abbey consisted of three ranges and the church functioned as a disconnected north range, in a quadrilateral layout. The abbey was west of the bishop's residence (Danish:bispegård) as evidenced by the excavations done in the 1950s.

The work of the canonesses under the abbess of the abbey was in daily prayers and meditation and education of young women of noble birth. They were assisted in the day-to-day life by lay men and women who did much of the house and farm work required to keep the abbey going. It may be assumed that there was a small school on the premises, much like a religious boarding school. It is unclear whether the nuns at Asmild were regular or secular canonesses.

Expansion of the abbey in the 13th century changed the architectural style of parts of the building to Gothic with pointed windows and arches. Apparently, there was a fire which destroyed the 'old' cathedral and abbey in the mid-14th century. The church was replaced on a smaller scale. The abbey was rebuilt though on a smaller scale, perhaps because of the strictness of the rule, and the lack of income producing properties. Most abbeys maintained an archive of letters of gift (Danish: gavebrev) but Asmild's has been lost. There remains only a single 1346 letter offering a gift for continued prayers for a deceased relative. The abbey is last mentioned in a letter of 1461, and then nothing until the 1536 dissolution of the abbey.

The lack of information on the last decades of the abbey may be perhaps in part attributed to the local rumors about the immoral behavior of some of the nuns and Augustinian canons at the cathedral. Local tradition has it that a brick tunnel or walkway connected the abbey with the monastery near the cathedral, though no empirical evidence has been located that such a connection existed. If people lost confidence in the abbey's ability to keep a strict rule, no noble family would entrust a daughter or sister to the nuns at Asmild.

=== Dissolution ===
The Reformation brought about the end of Asmild Abbey when Denmark became a Lutheran state in October 1536. The nuns were permitted to live at the abbey until their death, though without income. The abbey estate came under crown control and Asmild was given to the former Bishop of Børglum, Stygge Krumpen (Rosencrantz) as an income property once he was released from prison. The buildings were turned into an estate farm called Asmild Kloster Farm which passed into private ownership in 1673. The abbey burned down in 1713, but was rebuilt. The buildings called Asmild Kloster became the property of Viborg County in 1906. In 1907 the buildings burned down except for one wing which survived but was eventually torn down in 1958. The only remnants of the abbey today are the stone-lined well, Asmild Church, and one of its bells, cast by an anonymous artist in the 15th century which still rings from the low bell tower.

== Sources ==
- Asmild Kloster (in Danish)
