= Børglum =

Danish village from the late 12th century in Denmark

Coordinates: 57°22′N 9°50′E

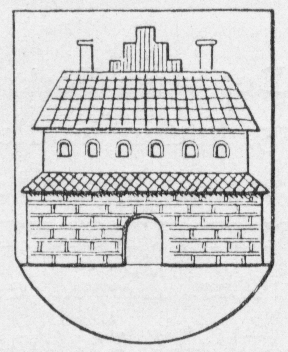
Børglum Abbey, featured on the coat of arms of the former Børglum Herred

Børglum is a Danish village with a population below 200 (1 January 2011) in Hjørring municipality, Region Nordjylland (until December 31, 2006; Løkken-Vrå municipality, North Jutland County).

== History ==
Børglum was the site of a royal gård from at least 1000. This was later converted for use as a monastery, Børglum Abbey, which was developed from c. 1180 by the Premonstratensians. Some of the buildings still exist as a manor house. The abbey was also the seat, from about 1220 until 1536, of the Roman Catholic Bishopric of Børglum.

Jens Møller Haugaard Børglum (1839–1909), father of Sculptor Gutzon Borglum (1867–1941) came from the village of Børglum. Gutzon Borglum is best known for his sculptured portraits of American presidents carved in the stone of Mount Rushmore in the Black Hills region of South Dakota.

A relatively unknown tale by Hans Christian Andersen is titled "The Bishop of Børglum and His Kinsmen".
