= List of craters on Callisto =

This is a list of named craters on Callisto, one of the many moons of Jupiter, the most heavily cratered natural satellite in the Solar System (for other features, see list of geological features on Callisto).

As of 2020, the Working Group for Planetary System Nomenclature has officially named a total of 142 craters on Callisto, more than on any other non-planetary object such as Ganymede (131), Rhea (128), Vesta (90), Ceres (90), Dione (73), Iapetus (58), Enceladus (53), Tethys (50) and Europa (41). (Note: The total number of features also includes names that have been dropped or not yet unapproved by IAU's Working Group for Planetary System Nomenclature (WGPSN)) Although some Callistoan craters refer to the nymph Callisto from Greek mythology, they are officially named after characters from myths and folktales of cultures of the Far North.

== List of Craters ==
Crater	Coordinates	Diameter (km)	Approval Year	Eponym	Ref
Adal	75.5°N 79.7°W	41.7	1979	Adal (Norse)	WGPSN
Aegir	45.8°S 103.8°W	53.9	1997	Aegir (Norse)	WGPSN
Agloolik	47.7°S 82.4°W	61.6	1997	Agloolik (Inuit)	WGPSN
Ägröi	43.2°N 10.9°W	67.4	1979	Äkräs (Uralic)	WGPSN
Ahti	41.4°N 102.4°W	54.8	1988	Ahti (Finnish)	WGPSN
Ajleke	22.7°N 101.4°W	70	1988	Ajleke (Sami)	WGPSN
Akycha	72.6°N 41.3°E	81	1979	Akycha (Inuit of Alaska)	WGPSN
Alfr	9.9°S 137.3°E	96	1979	Alfr (Norse)	WGPSN
Áli	59°N 55.9°W	32.9	1979	Áli (Norse)	WGPSN
Ánarr	44°N 0.5°W	41.7	1979	Ánarr (Norse)	WGPSN
Arcas	85.6°S 67.5°W	60.9	1997	Arcas (Greek)	WGPSN
Askr	51.8°N 35.9°E	68.8	1979	Askr (Norse)	WGPSN
Audr	30.9°S 80.6°W	80.8	1997	Audr (Norse)	WGPSN
Austri	80.9°S 64.5°W	15	1997	Austri (Norse)	WGPSN
Aziren	35.4°N 178.2°W	55.6	1988	Aziren (Estonian)	WGPSN
Balkr	28.9°N 11.7°W	68	1979	Balkr (Norse)	WGPSN
Barri	31.5°S 70.5°W	69	1997	Barri (Norse)	WGPSN
Bavörr	49.1°N 20°W	85.3	1979	Bavörr (Norse)	WGPSN
Beli	62.6°N 80.2°W	55.6	1979	Belenus (Celtic)	WGPSN
Biflindi	53.6°S 74.1°W	58	1997	Biflindi (Norse)	WGPSN
Bragi	75.5°N 60.7°W	61.8	1979	Bragi (Norse)	WGPSN
Brami	28.8°N 19°W	75.7	1979	Brami (Norse)	WGPSN
Bran	24.2°S 154.4°E	78	1979	Bran the Blessed (Celtic)	WGPSN
Buga	22.3°N 36.1°E	59	1979	Buga (god) (Evenk)	WGPSN
Buri	37.5°S 45.5°W	86	1979	Búri (Norse)	WGPSN
Burr	42.7°N 134.5°W	75.4	1979	Burr (Norse)	WGPSN
Dag	58.5°N 73.3°W	46.6	1979	Dag (Norse)	WGPSN
Danr	62.5°N 76.9°W	45.2	1979	Danr (Norse)	WGPSN
Debegey	10.2°N 166.2°W	125	2006	Debegey (Yukaghir)	WGPSN
Dia	73°N 50.5°W	34.4	1979	Dia (Greek)	WGPSN
Doh	30.6°N 141.4°W	59.5	1997	Doh (Ketian)	WGPSN
Dryops	80°N 34.8°W	31.5	1979	Dryops (Greek; son of Apollo)	WGPSN
Durinn	67°N 89.1°W	51.6	1979	Durin (Norse)	WGPSN
Egdir	33.9°N 35.9°W	60.6	1979	Eggthér (Norse)	WGPSN
Egres	42.5°N 176.6°W	45.5	1988	Äkräs (Karelian)	WGPSN
Erlik	66.8°N 1.3°W	26.6	1979	Erlik (Turkic)	WGPSN
Fadir	56.6°N 12.6°W	78.6	1979	Fadir (Norse)	WGPSN
Fili	64.2°N 10.3°E	31.7	1979	Fili (Norse)	WGPSN
Finnr	15.5°N 4.3°W	80	1979	Finnr (Norse)	WGPSN
Freki	79.8°N 8.3°E	55	1979	Freki (Norse)	WGPSN
Frodi	68.4°N 139.9°W	45.9	1979	Frodi (Norse)	WGPSN
Fulla	74°N 108.1°W	58.9	1979	Fulla (Norse)	WGPSN
Fulnir	60.1°N 35.3°W	43.1	1979	Fulnir (Norse)	WGPSN
Gandalfr	80.5°S 63.6°W	17	1997	Gandalfr (Norse)	WGPSN
Geri	66.7°N 6.2°E	38.9	1979	Geri (Norse)	WGPSN
Ginandi	85.3°S 52.1°W	44.4	1997	Ginandi (Norse)	WGPSN
Gisl	57.2°N 34.6°W	37	1979	Gisl (Norse)	WGPSN
Gloi	49°N 115°E	115.3	1979	Gloi (Norse)	WGPSN
Göll	57.3°N 40.3°E	55.4	1979	Göll (Norse)	WGPSN
Göndul	60°N 114.1°W	45.5	1979	Göndul (Norse)	WGPSN
Grimr	41.5°N 145.4°E	103.2	1979	Grimr (Norse)	WGPSN
Gunnr	64.6°N 104.7°W	61.1	1979	Gunnr (Norse)	WGPSN
Gymir	63.7°N 48.8°W	40.6	1979	Gymir (Norse)	WGPSN
Hábrok	76.2°N 131.9°W	37.2	1979	Hábrók (Norse)	WGPSN
Haki	25°N 44.9°E	72.2	1979	Haki (Norse)	WGPSN
Hár	3.5°S 2°E	52.2	1979	Hár (Norse)	WGPSN
Heimdall	63.5°S 3°E	210	2000	Heimdall (Norse)	WGPSN
Hepti	64.5°N 23.4°W	48.6	1979	Hepti (Norse)	WGPSN
Hijsi	63.1°N 171.5°W	54.1	1988	Hiisi (Karelian)	WGPSN
Hödr	69.1°N 89.2°W	76.5	1979	Hödr (Norse)	WGPSN
Hoenir	33.7°S 99.1°E	81.1	1979	Hoenir (Norse)	WGPSN
Högni	11.8°S 4.8°W	76	1979	Högni (Norse)	WGPSN
Höldr	43.9°N 108.2°W	68.1	1988	Höldr (Norse)	WGPSN
Igaluk	5.6°N 44°E	111.7	1979	Igaluk (Alaskan Inuit)	WGPSN
Ilma	29.9°S 167.2°W	102	1988	Ilma (not specified)	WGPSN
Ivarr	5.8°S 38.6°E	73.1	1979	Ivarr (Norse)	WGPSN
Jalkr	38.6°S 82.7°W	93.5	1997	Jalkr (Norse)	WGPSN
Jumal	58.9°N 118°W	58.5	1988	Jumal (Estonian)	WGPSN
Jumo	65.7°N 11.8°W	43.6	1979	Jumo (Uralic)	WGPSN
Kári	48.2°N 116.3°W	34.5	1979	Kári (Norse)	WGPSN
Karl	56.4°N 29.4°E	34	1979	Karl (Norse)	WGPSN
Keelut	76.8°S 90.9°W	64	1997	Keelut (Inuit)	WGPSN
Kul'	62.9°N 121.9°W	40.5	1988	Kul' (Komi)	WGPSN
Lempo	25.2°S 40.1°E	41.3	1988	Lempo (Uralic)	WGPSN
Ljekio	49.1°N 162.3°W	23.8	1988	Liekkiö (Finnish)	WGPSN
Lodurr	50.8°S 89.9°E	72	1979	Lóðurr (Norse)	WGPSN
Lofn	56.5°S 22.3°W	200	1997	Lofn (Norse)	WGPSN
Loni	3.6°S 145.7°E	85	1979	Loni (Norse)	WGPSN
Losy	65.3°N 36.7°E	62.1	1979	Losy (Mongol)	WGPSN
Lycaon	45.4°S 5.9°W	59	1997	Lycaon (Greek)	WGPSN
Maderatcha	30.7°N 95.3°W	66.2	1988	Máttaráhkká (Sami)	WGPSN
Mera	64.1°N 75.2°W	39.5	1979	Mera (Greek)	WGPSN
Mimir	32.6°N 53.2°W	47.7	1979	Mimir (Norse)	WGPSN
Mitsina	57.5°N 103.7°W	40.4	1979	Mitsina (Alaskan Inuit)	WGPSN
Modi	66.4°N 119.3°W	37.8	1979	Modi (Norse)	WGPSN
Nakki	56.4°S 69.7°W	59.8	1997	Näkki (Finnish)	WGPSN
Nama	57°N 29°E	30.1	1979	Nama (? folklore)	WGPSN
Nár	1.5°S 46°W	56.9	1979	Nár (Norse)	WGPSN
Nerrivik	16.9°S 56.4°W	44.3	1979	Nerrivik (Alaskan Inuit)	WGPSN
Nidi	66.4°N 94.9°W	49.3	1979	Niði (Norse)	WGPSN
Nirkes	31.4°N 164.3°W	58.5	1988	Nyyrikki (Karelian)	WGPSN
Njord	16.7°N 132.6°W	44.6	1988	Njord (Norse)	WGPSN
Nori	45.2°N 16.4°E	114	1979	Nori (Norse)	WGPSN
Norov-Ava	54.6°N 112.8°W	41.4	1988	Norov-Ava (Mordvinian)	WGPSN
Nuada	62.3°N 87.5°E	66	1979	Nuada (Celtic)	WGPSN
Numi-Torum	50.1°S 92.9°W	75.6	1997	Numi-Torum (Mansi people of Russia)	WGPSN
Nyctimus	62.8°S 3.9°W	34	1997	Nyctimus (Greek)	WGPSN
Oluksak	47.8°S 63.5°W	86.7	1997	Oluksak (Celtic)	WGPSN
Omolʼ	42.3°N 116.9°W	60.4	1988	Omolʼ (Komi)	WGPSN
Orestheus	46.7°S 47.7°W	22.5	1997	Orestheus (Greek)	WGPSN
Oski	57.5°N 91°E	48.1	1979	Oski (Norse)	WGPSN
Ottar	61.5°N 103.9°W	59.8	1979	Ottar (Norse)	WGPSN
Pekko	18.3°N 5.4°W	62	1979	Pekko (Uralic)	WGPSN
Randver	71.9°S 53.9°W	28	1997	Randver (Norse)	WGPSN
Reginleif	66°S 96.5°W	54.8	1997	Regincleif (Norse)	WGPSN
Reginn	39.8°N 90.1°W	57	1979	Reginn (Norse)	WGPSN
Reifnir	50.8°S 54.3°W	36.8	1997	Reifnir (Norse)	WGPSN
Rigr	70.8°N 115.4°E	72.5	1979	Rigr (Norse)	WGPSN
Rongoteus	53.6°N 106.1°W	35.5	1988	Rongoteus (Karelian)	WGPSN
Rota	27.2°N 108.4°W	45	1988	Róta (Norse)	WGPSN
Saga	0.6°N 34.1°E	11.1	1979	Saga (Norse)	WGPSN
Sarakka	3.3°S 53.5°W	47.7	1979	Sarakka (Uralic)	WGPSN
Seqinek	55.5°N 25.4°W	80.7	1979	Seqinek (Inuit)	WGPSN
Sholmo	53.7°N 16.2°W	57	1979	Sholmo (Uralic)	WGPSN
Sigyn	35.9°N 29°W	49.8	1979	Sigyn (Norse)	WGPSN
Skeggold	49.7°S 31.9°W	43	1997	Skeggöld (Norse)	WGPSN
Sköll	55.6°N 44.4°E	59.6	1979	Sköll (Norse)	WGPSN
Skuld	10°N 37.9°W	91.8	1979	Skuld (Norse)	WGPSN
Sudri	55.9°N 135.6°W	69.5	1979	Sudri (Norse)	WGPSN
Sumbur	67.1°N 34.8°E	37.9	1979	Sumbur (Buryat)	WGPSN
Tapio	30.1°N 108.6°W	52.2	1988	Tapio (Finnish)	WGPSN
Thekkr	80.3°S 62°W	13	1997	Thekkr (Norse)	WGPSN
Thorir	31.9°S 66.7°W	62.7	1997	Thorir (Norse)	WGPSN
Tindr	2.3°S 4.5°E	75.8	1979	Tindr (Norse)	WGPSN
Tontu	27.6°N 100.3°W	40.2	1988	Tonttu (Finnish)	WGPSN
Tornarsuk	28.8°N 127.6°W	99	1979	Tornarsuk (Greenland Inuit)	WGPSN
Tyll	44.8°N 166.5°W	68.7	1988	Suur Tõll (Estonian)	WGPSN
Tyn	71.1°N 127.5°E	63	1979	Tyn (Germanic)	WGPSN
Uksakka	49.5°S 42.2°W	22.5	1997	Uksakka (Finnish)	WGPSN
Valfödr	1.3°S 113°E	101.5	1979	Valfödr (Norse)	WGPSN
Vali	9.7°N 34.7°E	54.3	1979	Vali (Norse)	WGPSN
Vanapagan	39.5°N 158.5°W	62.7	1988	Vanapagan (Estonian)	WGPSN
Veralden	33.3°N 95.5°W	75.2	1988	Veralden (Sami religion)	WGPSN
Vestri	45.3°N 52.5°W	77.3	1979	Vestri (Norse)	WGPSN
Vidarr	12.1°N 166.6°E	78	1988	Vidarr (Norse)	WGPSN
Vili	32.6°N 215.9°W	42	2019	Vili (Norse)	WGPSN
Vitr	22.1°S 10.6°E	72.8	1979	Vitr (Norse)	WGPSN
Vu-Murt	21.5°N 170.3°W	34.5	1988	Vu-Murt (Estonian)	WGPSN
Vutash	31.6°N 102.3°W	46.2	1988	Vutash (Estonian)	WGPSN
Ymir	51.5°N 99.7°W	79	1979	Ymir (Norse)	WGPSN
Yuryung	54.7°S 85.7°W	75.1	1997	Yuryung (Sakha)	WGPSN

back to top

== See also ==
- List of craters on the Moon
- List of craters on Mars
- List of craters on Mercury
- List of craters on Venus
