= List of quadrangles on Callisto =

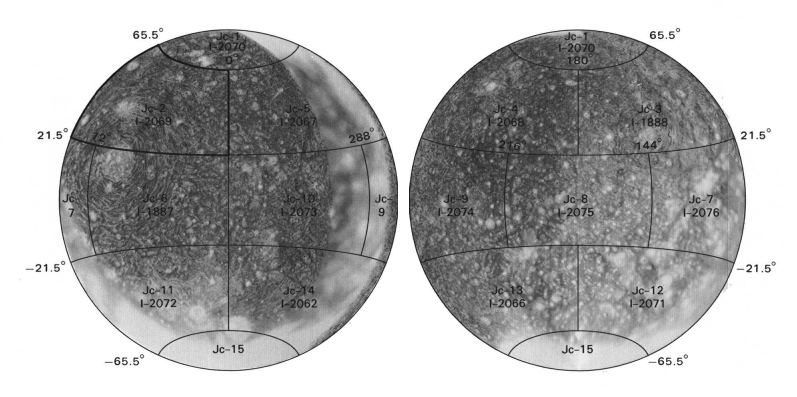
An arrangement of the quadrangles on Callisto

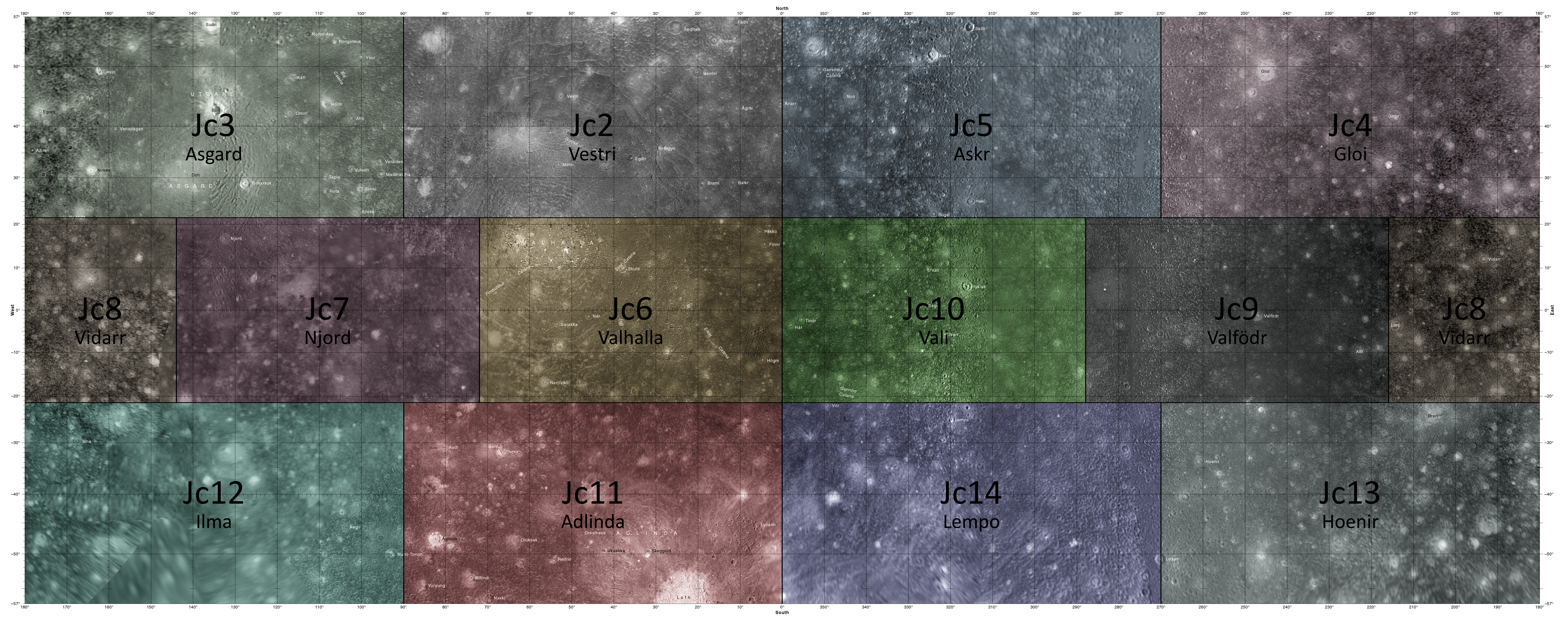
A Mercator projection of the arrangement of the quadrangles on Callisto except at the poles

The surface of Callisto has been divided into 15 quadrangles or sections.

Name	Number	Latitude	Longitude	Ref
Gipul Catena	Jc1	65-90° N	0-360° W	
Vestri	Jc2	21-66° N	0-90° W	
Asgard	Jc3	21-66° N	90-180° W	
Gloi	Jc4	21-66° N	180-270° W	
Askr	Jc5	21-66° N	270-360° W	
Valhalla	Jc6	22° N-22° S	0-72° W	
Njord	Jc7	22° N-22° S	72-144° W	
Vidarr	Jc8	22° N-22° S	144-216° W	
Valfödr	Jc9	22° N-22° S	216-288° W	
Vali	Jc10	22° N-22° S	288-360° W	
Adlinda	Jc11	21-66° S	0-90° W	
Ilma	Jc12	21-66° S	90-180° W	
Hoenir	Jc13	21-66° S	180-270° W	
Lempo	Jc14	21-66° S	270-360° W	
Keelut	Jc15	65-90° S	0-360° W	

== See also ==
- List of geological features on Callisto
- List of craters on Callisto
