= Heimdall (crater) =

Callistoan impact crater

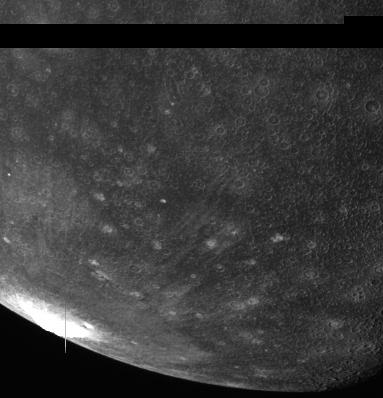
- A mosaic image of Callisto's south pole, showing Heimdall, the massive, bright crater to the lower left, taken by the Galileo space probe on 9 September 1996.
- Location: Callisto
- Coordinates: 63.5°S 3°E
- Diameter: 210 kilometres (130 mi)
- Eponym: Nordic god of light

Heimdall is one of the largest known impact craters on Jupiter's Galilean satellite Callisto, with a diameter of 210 km. It is located near the Callistoan south pole at 63.5°S 3°E. Its existence was first suspected from Voyager images and later confirmed by Galileo.

Cratered plains form the oldest recognizable unit on Callisto, but subtle differences in color and crater frequencies suggest regional differences in its development. The formation of Adlinda, Asgard, Valhalla, Heimdall, and Lofn crater appear to follow in that order.

Heimdall was named after the god of light in Norse mythology; this name was approved by the International Astronomical Union in 2000.

== See also ==
- List of geological features on Callisto
- List of craters on Callisto
- Valhalla
