= Lofn (crater) =

Crater on Callisto

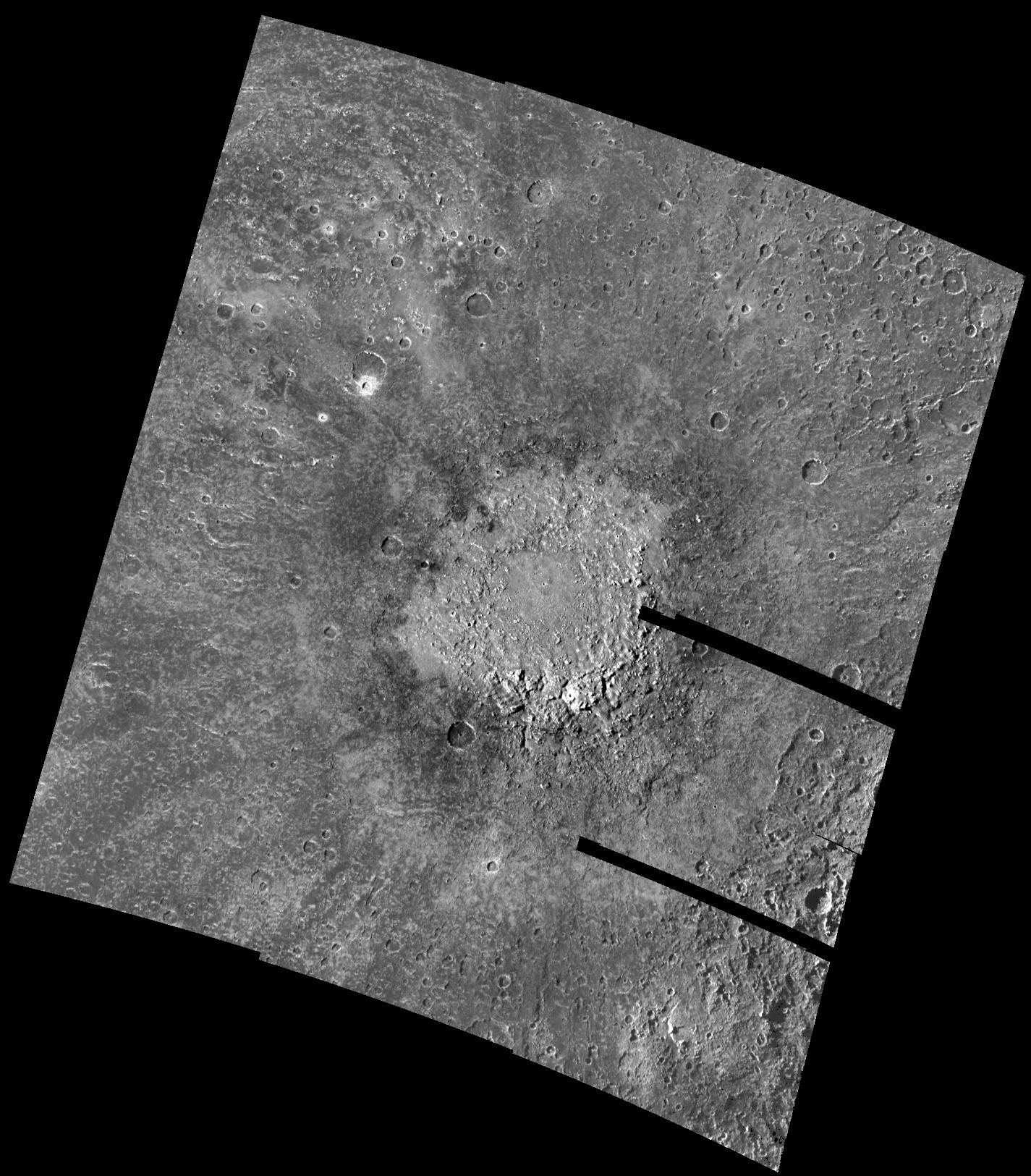
- A photomosaic of Lofn and its surrounding regions, as imaged by the Galileo space probe on November 17 1997.
- Feature type: Impact crater
- Location: Callisto
- Coordinates: 56.50°S 22.30°W
- Diameter: 180 kilometres (110 mi) to 200 kilometres (120 mi)
- Depth: ~0.6 km
- Eponym: Lofn

Lofn is a large and relatively young crater on Jupiter's second-largest satellite Callisto. The crater was identified in 1997. Located near the south pole of this moon, Lofn is classified as a flat floored or anomalous dome impact crater. It is superimposed on the multi-ring structure of another crater called Adlinda, obscuring about 30 percent of it.

== Naming ==
Lofn was named after the goddess of marriage in Norse mythology. The name was chosen by the International Astronomical Union (IAU) in line with the theme that all craters and features on Callisto should be named after deities, characters and places from mythologies of people living in the Far North, of which Norse mythology is one of them.

The IAU approved the name for Lofn in 1997.

== Location and Discovery ==
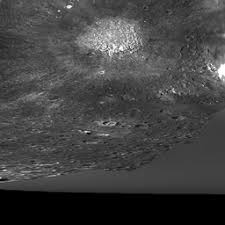
The crater Lofn seen at a low angle. The bright patch to the right is a portion of the crater Heimdall.

Lofn is located in the southern hemisphere of Callisto, about two-thirds of the way from the moon's equator to its south pole. The latitude and longitude of its center are 56°S and 23°W, respectively. The diameter of Lofn is about 180 kilometres (110 mi) to 200 kilometres (120 mi).

Lofn was first observed as a large, circular, high-albedo feature (facula) on low resolution images taken by Voyager probes in 1979–1980. It was initially misidentified as part of Adlinda, another large impact basin nearby, before being recognized as a distinct feature. Later in 1997, the Galileo orbiter took a number of high resolution images of the crater during its G2 and G8, revealing a large, flat-floored crater instead of a multi-ring structure. It was determined that Adlinda is actually located slightly to the northwest of Lofn which partially obscures about a third of Adlinda's structure.

Another multi-ring crater called Heimdall is situated to the southeast of Lofn, along with the smaller crater Nyctimus. To the northeast, another named crater called Lycaon is located. The crater Skeggold, which, like Lofn, is also superimposed on Adlinda, is nearby to the northwest.

== Geology ==
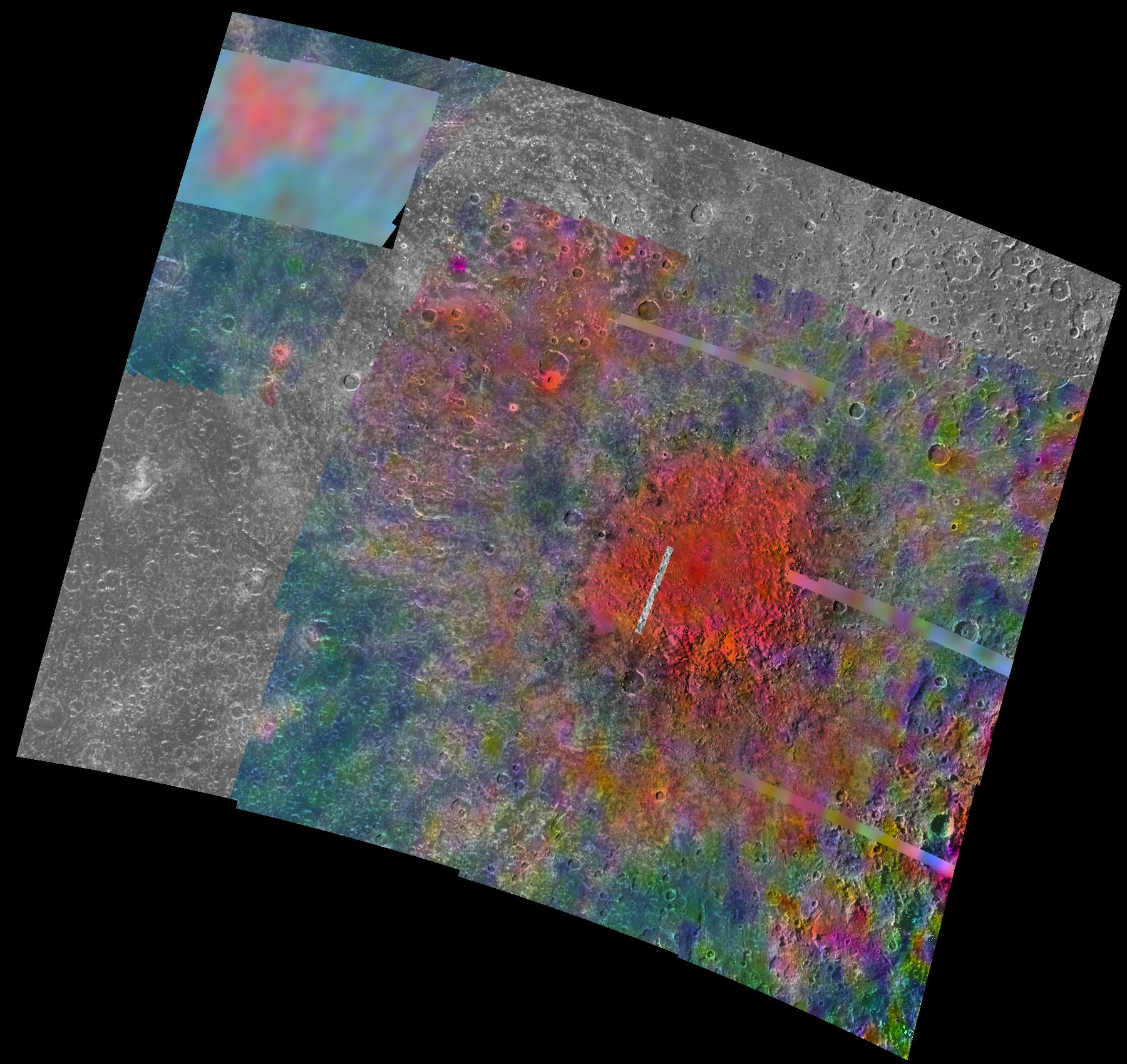
The composite (near infrared—visible) false color image of Lofn. The red corresponds to the more ice rich surface, while the blue to the ice poor.

Lofn is one of the largest impact crater on Callisto. The crater and the area immediately adjacent to it are divided in a number of geological units. They include an approximately circular and relatively bright central zone, an asymmetrical ring of mountainous and hummocky terrain around it, which is thought to correspond to the degraded crater rim.

The central zone of Lofn (100–120 km in diameter) corresponds to the crater floor which lies about 0.6 kilometres (0.37 mi) below the surrounding cratered plains. Its rim and the ring of bright ejecta are water rich as was determined by the infrared spectroscopic observations by Galileo.

The opposite is true for the dark material of the outer impact deposits, which appears to be relatively ice poor, but contains increased amounts of carbon dioxide. Beyond the crater rim there are two concentric outer rings made of bright and dark impact ejecta deposits.

Lofn is a shallow crater as compared to other craters of similar size. This is the main reason why it is called a flat-floored or anomalous dome crater. The relative shallowness of it is explained by either fragmentation of the impactor prior to the contact with the surface or by the post impact relaxation of Callisto's ductile crust. Other examples of such craters are Doh and Bran. The hummocky terrain (rim) surrounding the floor consists of randomly distributed massifs as large as 50 kilometres (31 mi) and has mottled appearance at some places. The width of the rim unit varies from about 18 km on the northwest side to more than 130 kilometres (81 mi) on the southeast side.

The crater rim is encircled by a discontinuous ring of bright ejecta, which is asymmetric much like the rim itself. It is the thickest on the southeast side of Lofn, where it is found at the distance up to 300 kilometres (190 mi) from the center of the crater. The outermost ring of ejecta is made predominantly of dark material. It is especially prominent on the northwest side of Lofn. The patches of ejecta associated with the crater can be found as far as 490 kilometres (300 mi) from its center in the cratered plains.

The impact ejecta from Lofn partially buried the multi-ring structure of nearby Adlinda, which is situated at the distance of about 500 kilometres (310 mi) to the northwest from it.

== Age and formation ==
Lofn is one of the youngest impact craters on Callisto. All its geological units contain much less small impact craters than the surrounding crater plains. The age of Lofn is estimated at 1.39–3.88 billion years depending on the assumed cratering rate in the past.

The significant asymmetry in distribution of the impact ejecta indicates that Lofn was formed by an oblique impact. The impactor probably came from the northwest. The shallowness of the crater may be related to the fragmentation of the impactor prior to the contact with the surface. A cluster of fragments is generally less efficient in excavation of the surface material than a single body. Another reason for the flat floor of Lofn is viscous relaxation of the crust after impact, which implies the existence of a layer of ductile material below the surface at the time of the impact. This soft material may be warm ice or even a subsurface ocean.

The impact initially caused the formation of a transient crater with the diameter of about 150 km and depth of about 50 km, which then relaxed forming the present crater with the final diameter of about 300 km. The impact probably penetrated through the dark water poor ejecta of Adlinda and Heimdell, then entered a water ice rich layer beneath it. This explains the distribution of the Lofn's ejecta. The outer rings of impact deposits around Lofn are made from the dark material, which was excavated first and accelerated to a high speed. After that the light water rich material was excavated from the depth, but with a lower speed forming the bright inner ring of ejecta.

== See also ==
- List of geological features on Callisto
- List of craters on Callisto
- Valhalla
