= Lofn (disambiguation) =

Lofn may refer to

- Lofn, a deity of Norse mythology;
- Lofn (crater), a crater on the Jovian moon Callisto.
