= Heimdall (disambiguation) =

Heimdall or Heimdallr, is a god in Norse mythology.

Heimdall may also refer to:

== Crater ==
- Heimdall (crater), a crater on Callisto

== Fiction ==
- Heimdall (character), a comic book character based on the god
- Heimdall, an Asgard character in Stargate SG-1
- Heimdall (The Hitchhiker's Guide to the Galaxy), a character in And Another Thing... by Eoin Colfer
- Heimdall, a character in the anime and manga The Mythical Detective Loki Ragnarok

== Video games ==
- Heimdall (video game), 1991
  - Heimdall 2, the 1994 sequel
- Heimdall, a fictional aircraft carrier in Carrier
- Heimdallr, a fictional city featured in the Trails series

== Software ==
- Heimdall (software), software used for flashing and debugging Android handsets and tablets made by Samsung

== See also ==
- Heimdal (disambiguation)
