= Tindr =

Tindr may refer to:

- Tindr (crater), a crater on Jupiter's moon Callisto
- Tindr Hallkelsson, an Icelandic poet active around the year 1000

== See also ==
- Tinder (disambiguation)
