= Kol Facula =

Facula on Callisto, Jupiter

- Feature type: Facula
- Location: Callisto, Jupiter
- Coordinates: 4.50°N 282.70°W
- Diameter: 390 km (240 mi)
- Naming: 2006
- Eponym: Kol, a jötnar in Icelandic mythology

Kol Facula is a facula, or bright geological feature, on Callisto, a Galilean moon of Jupiter. The facula was named after Kol, the eponymous jötnar, or frost giant, in Icelandic mythology. The name "Kol Facula" was officially approved by the International Astronomical Union (IAU) in 2006.

== Geology and characteristics ==
Its coordinates are 4.50°N 282.70°W, and it has a diameter of 390 kilometres (240 mi).

== See also ==
- List of geological features on Callisto
- List of jötnar in Norse mythology
