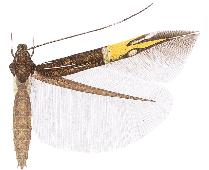

Scientific classification
- Kingdom: Animalia
- Phylum: Arthropoda
- Clade: Pancrustacea
- Class: Insecta
- Order: Lepidoptera
- Family: Cosmopterigidae
- Genus: Cosmopterix
- Species: C. callisto

Binomial name
- Cosmopterix callisto Koster, 2010

= Cosmopterix callisto =

Species of moth

Cosmopterix callisto is a moth of the family Cosmopterigidae. It is known from Peru.

== Description ==
Female. Forewing length 3.9 mm. Head: frons shining ochreous-white, vertex, neck tufts and collar shining dark brown with reddish gloss and some bluish and greenish reflections, lined white laterally; labial palpus first segment very short, ochreous-white, second segment three-quarters of the length of third, dark brown with white longitudinal lines laterally, third segment white, lined dark brown laterally; scape dorsally shining dark brown with a white anterior line, ventrally shining ochreous-white, antenna shining dark brown with a white anterior line from base to beyond one half, distal part interrupted, followed towards apex by one white segment, one dark brown, a white section of approximately eight segments, apical part dark brown and slightly serrate. Thorax and tegulae shining dark brown with reddish gloss and greenish reflection. Legs: shining dark brown, femora shining ochreous, femur of hindleg with golden gloss, tibiae of foreleg and midleg with white medial spots and narrow white apical rings, tarsal segments one to three and five of foreleg and midleg with longitudinal white lines, tibia of hindleg with bluish silver subbasal and medial streaks and a white apical ring, tarsal segments one to four dark brown with golden gloss, segment five entirely ochreous-white, spurs dark greyish brown, apically lighter. Forewing shining dark brown with reddish gloss, three narrow white lines in the basal area, a subcostal from base to one-eighth, bending from costa distally, a medial just above fold from near base to one-third, a short dorsal, starting just before end of the medial, a shining dark yellow transverse fascia beyond the middle with a very long apical protrusion, bordered on the inner edge by a narrow, tubercular, silver metallic fascia with greenish reflection and with a blackish brown subcostal spot on outside, bordered on the outer edge by a longitudinal tubercular silver metallic costal spot with a white costal streak, on dorsum, slightly inward of the costal spot, an oval metallic silver dorsal spot, both spots broadly edged dark brown, a silver metallic apical line from the apical protrusion, changing to shining white in the cilia, cilia dark brown around apex, slightly paler towards dorsum. Hindwing shining dark brown with reddish gloss, cilia dark brown. Underside: forewing shining dark brown, hindwing shining dark brown. Abdomen dorsally dark brown with reddish gloss, ventrally shining greyish brown, segments banded broad yellowish white posteriorly, anal tuft shining dark brown.

== Etymology ==
The species is named after Callisto, a moon of Jupiter. To be treated as a noun in apposition.
