= Heimdal (disambiguation) =

Heimdal is a borough in the city of Trondheim, Trøndelag county, Norway.

Heimdal or Heimdall may refer to:

== Places ==
=== Norway ===
- Heimdal Station, a railway station in Trondheim
- Heimdal Church, a parish church in Trondheim
- Heimdal Upper Secondary School, Sør-Trøndelag county
- Heimdal, Innlandet, a village, Løten municipality, Innlandet county
- Heimdal gas field, in the North Sea

=== Elsewhere ===
- Heimdal (crater), an impact crater on Mars
- Heimdal, North Dakota, a census-designated place and unincorporated community in Wells County, US
- Heimdal Glacier, Greenland

== Other uses ==
- HNoMS Heimdal (1892), a Norwegian warship
- Heimdall, a god in Norse mythology
  - Heimdall (character), a character from Marvel Comics
- Heimdal, an implementation of the Kerberos authentication protocol
- 2015 Heimdal train derailment, near Heimdal, North Dakota, US
- Heimdal (album), a 2023 album by Enslaved

== See also ==
- Heimdall (disambiguation)
