= Arcas (crater) =

Crater on Callisto

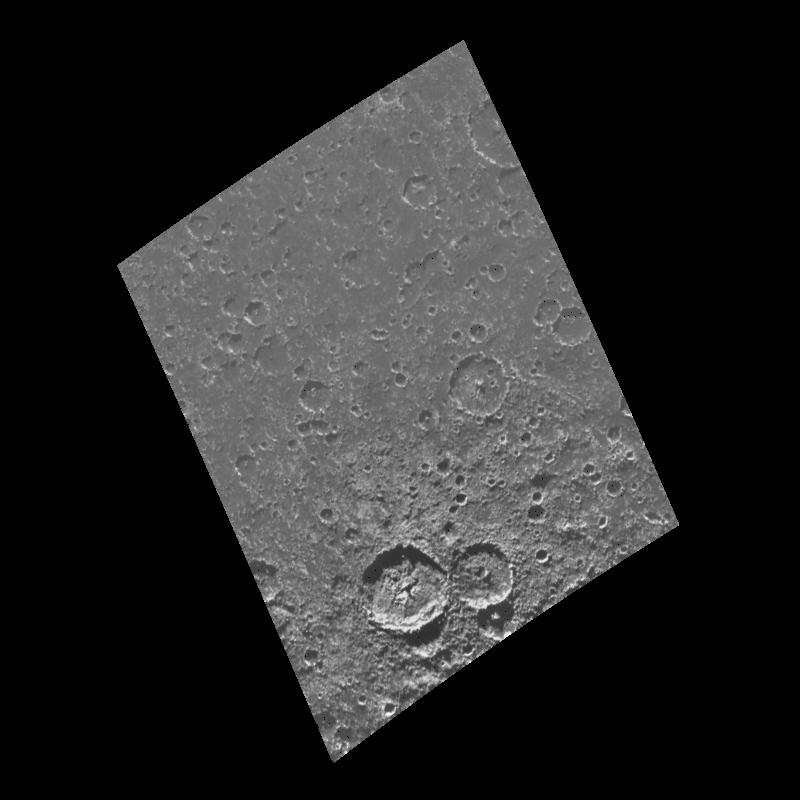
- Galileo image of a region near the south pole of Callisto, taken on 6 May 1997. Arcas and the slightly smaller crater Ginandi are near the bottom.
- Location: Callisto
- Coordinates: 85.6°S 67.5°W
- Diameter: 60 km (37 mi)
- Eponym: Arcas

Arcas is a crater on Jupiter's moon Callisto measuring 60 km (37 mi) across. It is an example of a central pit impact crater. A smaller crater near Arcas is called Ginandi. The crater is named after Arcas, the son of Callisto in Greek mythology.
