= Tinder (disambiguation) =

Tinder is combustible material used to start fires.

Tinder may also refer to:

- Tinder (app), matchmaking software
- Tinder Foundation, a UK-based charity for digital inclusion
- Tinder Press, an imprint of Headline Publishing Group
- John Daniel Tinder (born 1950), U.S. judge

== See also ==
- Tindr (disambiguation)
