= Jalkr =

Crater on Callisto

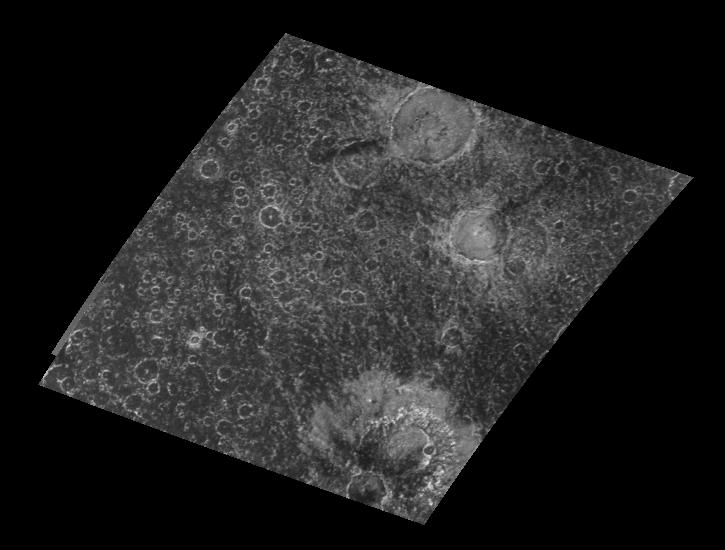
- Galileo image of a region in the south hemisphere of Callisto, taken on 6 May 1997. Jalkr is at the bottom corner.
- Feature type: Impact crater
- Coordinates: 38.60°S 82.70°W
- Diameter: 93.50 km
- Eponym: Alternative name for Odin

Jalkr is a bright crater on Jupiter's moon Callisto measuring 74 km across (in the lower part of the image). This an example of a central dome impact crater. A smaller degraded crater in the upper part of the image is called Audr.
