= Hár (crater) =

Crater on Jupiter's moon Callisto

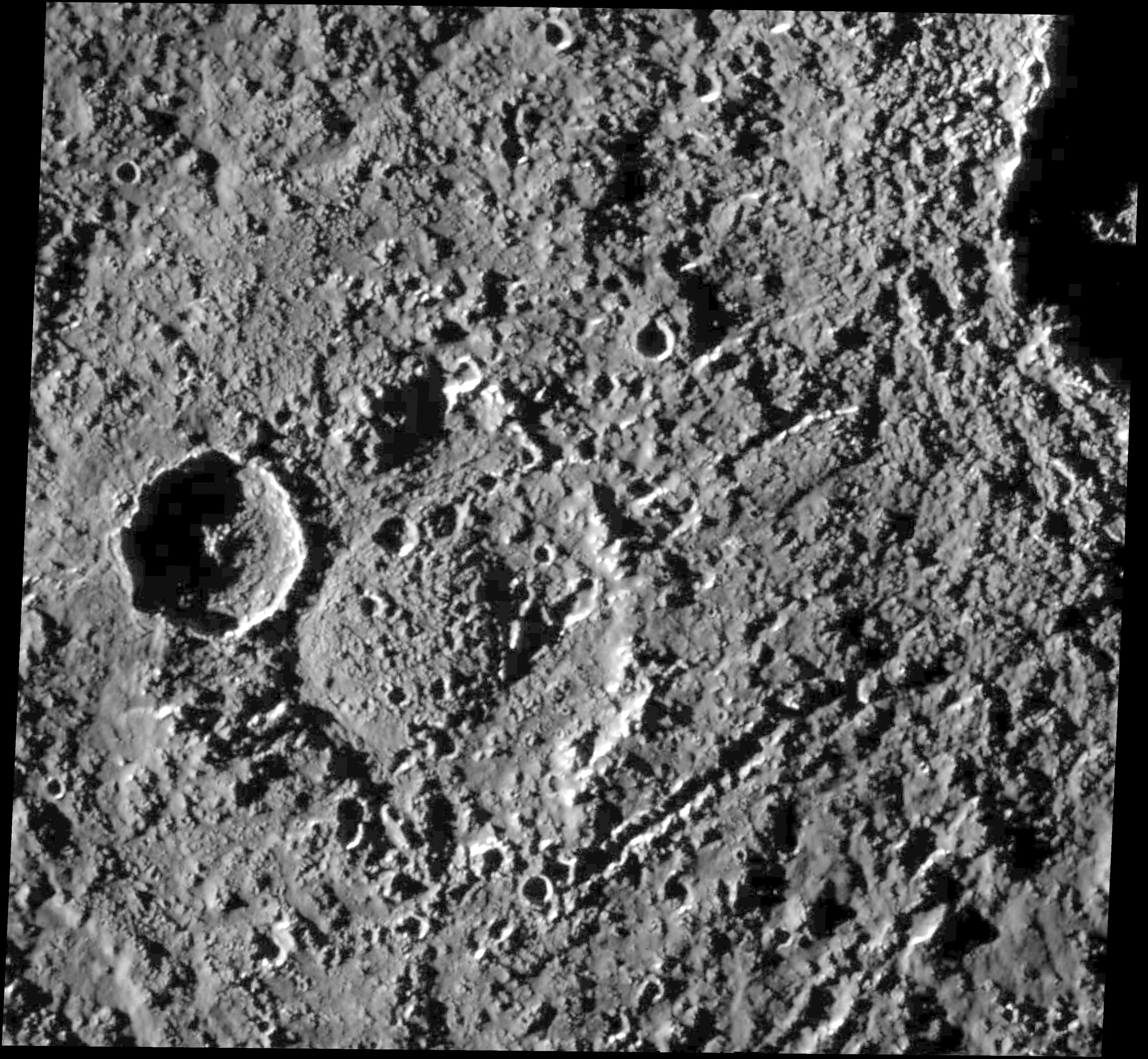
Galileo image of Hár, taken on 25 June 1997

Hár is a crater on Jupiter's moon Callisto. Its name is one of the many names of Odin, the supreme god in Norse mythology. This is an example of a central dome impact crater. Its name was adopted by the International Astronomical Union (IAU) in 1979.

Hár is a double-ringed crater approximately 120 kilometres (75 mi) in diameter located southwest of the crater Tindr. Its inner ring is rugged and hummocky, and it is surrounded by a "platform" of hilly terrain. Occupying the center of the crater is a very prominent dome about 82 kilometres (51 mi) in diameter, offset to the west from the crater center. The dome's origin is unclear, but it may have formed from the uplift of icy material below the crater's center after its formative impact event. Many of Hár's features are muted due to ejecta from Tindr, and a series of radiating crater chains from Tindr cut across Hár's structure.
