= Keelut (crater) =

Crater on Callisto

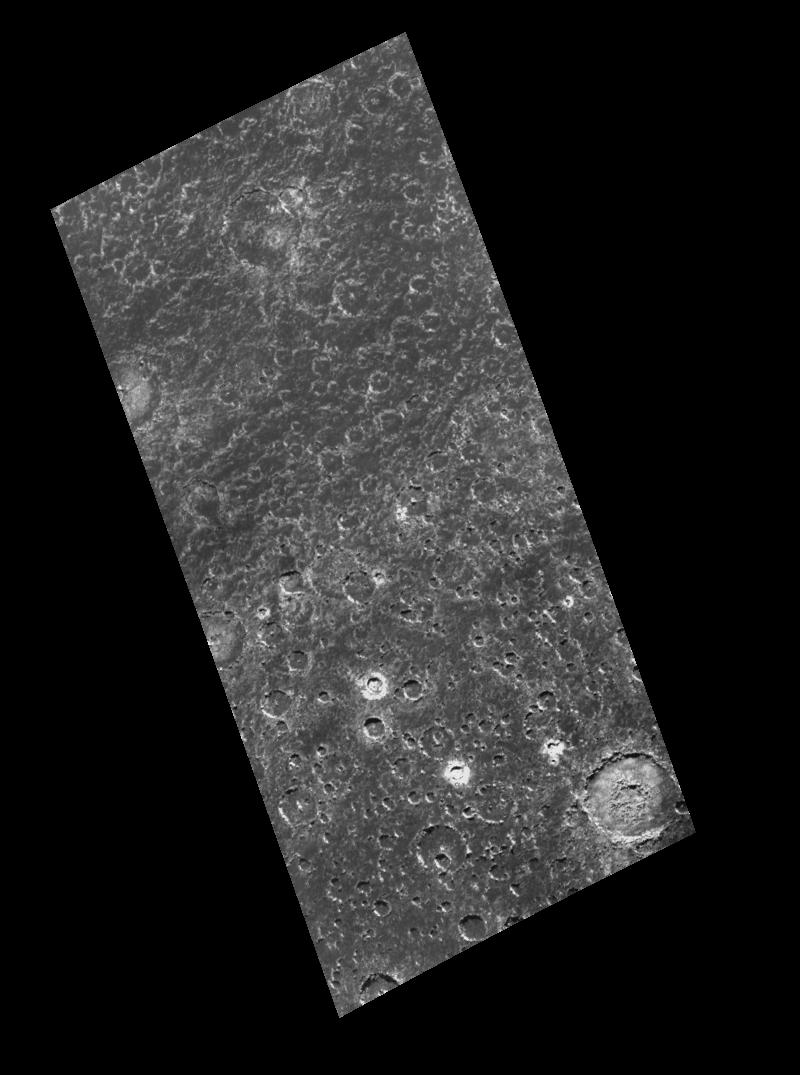
Galileo image of a region near the south pole of Callisto, taken on 6 May 1997. Keelut is in the lower right.

Keelut is a crater on Jupiter's moon Callisto. It is situated near the south pole and is an example of a central pit impact crater. It measures 47 km across.

In the upper part of the image, the degraded Reginleif crater is visible.
