= Äkräs =

Finnish god of fertility

- Creator of Peas, Beans, Rutabagas, Cabbages, Flax and Hemp
- Other names: Kainuu: Pellon Äkräs; Karelia: Pyh' Äkrässie, Pyhä Ägräs, Pyhä Ägröi, Pyhä Äkrässie, Pyhä Äkrässii, Ägrässei, Äkrässie, Äkrässii; Ostrobothnia: Äyräs; Satakunta: Ähmäri, Äyri, Äyräs
- Ethnic group: Finns, Karelians
- Offspring: Ähky (Horse colic)

Equivalents
- Belarusian: Sporys
- Latvian: Jumis

Äkräs or Äyräs is a haltija or goddess of various plants in Finnish mythology, especially rutabagas. She was first mentioned in writing by Mikael Agricola in 1551: "Egres created peas, beans, rutabagas / Brought forth cabbages, flax, hemp" (Egres hernet Pawudh Naurit loi / Caalit Linat ia Hamput edestoi). She was also later associated with potatoes.

She was known widely from Western Finland to Karelia, and there are many similar beliefs as those associated with Äkräs in traditions around Europe. Similar beliefs also exist among Udmurts.

== Name ==
The spelling "Egres", as mentioned by Agricola, was quoted in all writings until 1761. Vicar in Leppävirta, I.D. Alopaeus, said this name in Leppävirta and Kuopio was "Äcräs", who gave rutabagas. Terms such as äkräs rutabaga refer to a rutabaga with two ends growing from the same core (or conjoined rutabagas). Similar terminology has also been used in relation to potatoes and flax. In Salmi, Karelia, the term "King Ägröi" meant conjoined potatoes.

In North Ostrobothnia, the name has been known in the form Äyräs. In Karelia, different variations exist, such as Ägräs, Äkrässie, Ägrässie, Ägröi and Äkröi.

The origin of the name could be in the Proto-Germanic *akra-z ("field"). Kaarle Krohn suggested an origin in the term "Pyhä Greus" (Saint Gregory) and Martti Haavio in the term "Pyhä Kros" (True Cross). Väinö Voionmaa believed Ägräs was the forefather and god of the Ägräs family, which then would've also given name to Äyräpää. Uno Harva did not support this theory. Viljo Alanen believed the name came from äyräs 'bank; riverbank' and pellon äyräs 'lower side of the field'.

== In runic songs ==
Äkräs appears in Karelian runic songs read out when sowing rutabagas. She also appears in a North Ostrobothnian stone origin spell: "Stone is the son of kimmo, kammo, / Egg of earth, little cake of the field, / The end of the palm of the (honourable) old mother Äyräs" (Kivi on kimmon, kammon poika, / Maan muna, pellon kakkara, / Äyräs-ämmän kämmenpää).

Harva wondered if the old mother mentioned in Western Finnish Shrove Tuesday songs means Äkräs: the song asks rutabagas to grow as big as the old mother's buttock (simmossi juuriskoi / ku ämmän perspuoliskoi). It was also said that horse colic was the son of Äyräs, Äyri, or plural Äyräät.

== Beliefs ==
When an äkräs rutabaga was found, it was put into a hole with a ritual. Details of the ritual vary by region. However, a central part is pretending the rutabaga is too heavy to be carried. These rutabagas, and later also potatoes, were seen to have extra fertility power. In Paltamo, Äkräs of the Field (Pellon Äkräs) was worshipped during sowing and harvest, and a large bread was offered to her at the start of sowing. In Polvijärvi, the same term has meant a tree which harvest was sacrificed to.

Äkräs was also a protector of the field who yelled out loud if there was a thief on the field. If there was a rutabaga that had split, it was said this was caused by the rutabaga yelling so much. On fields made on hills, her home was on the side closest to the bottom of the slope, as this side also tended to be more fertile over time.
