= List of geological features on Callisto =

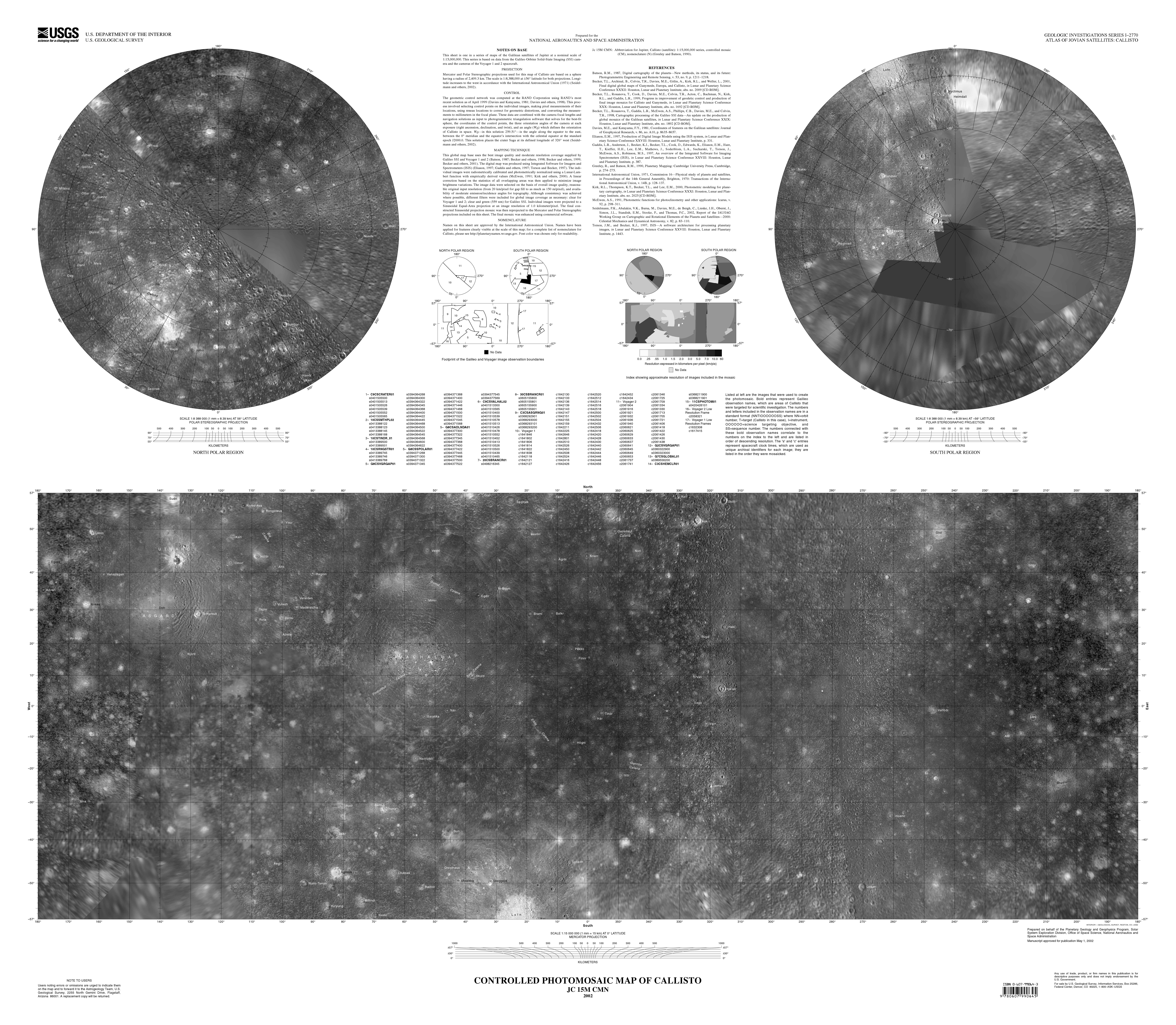
USGS map of Callisto

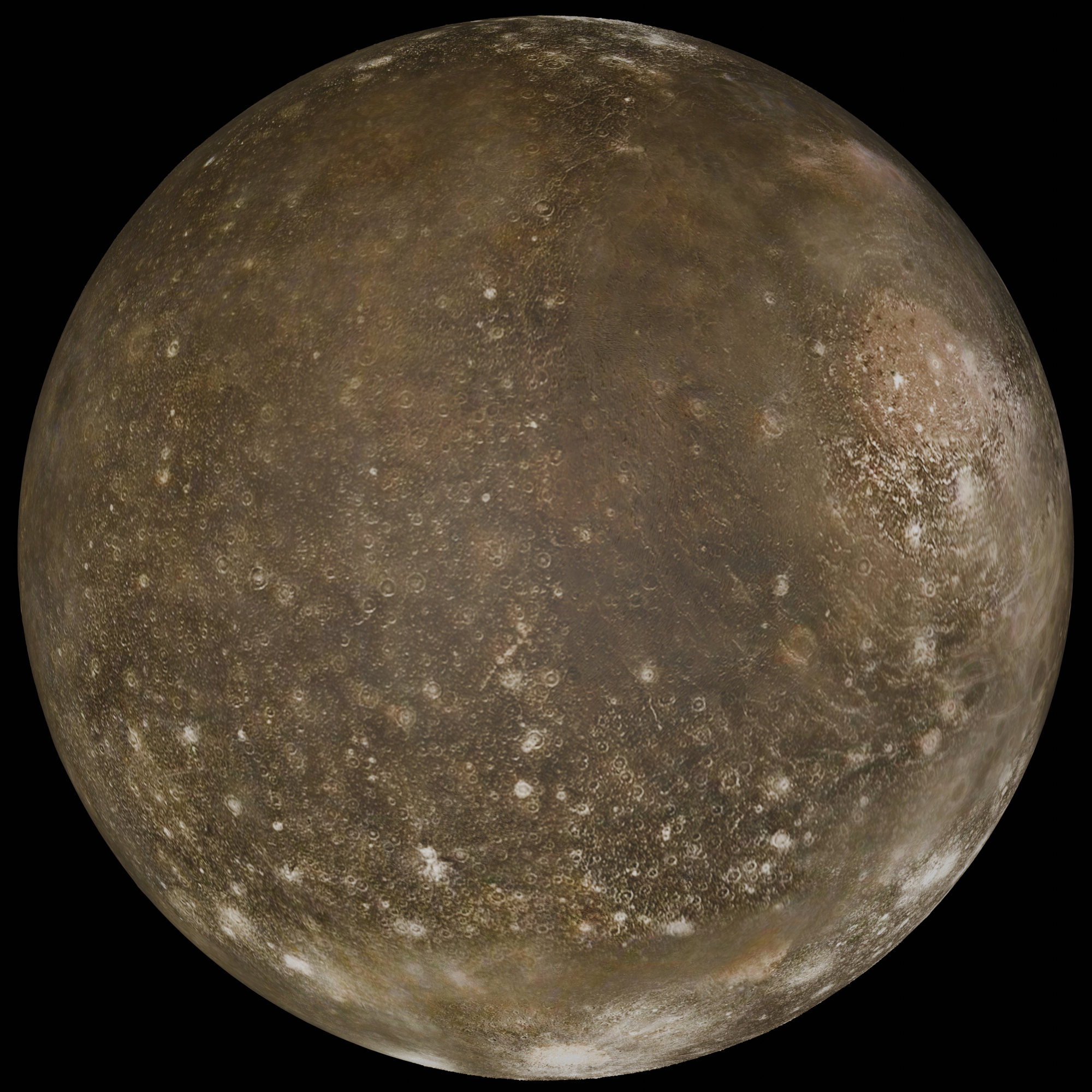
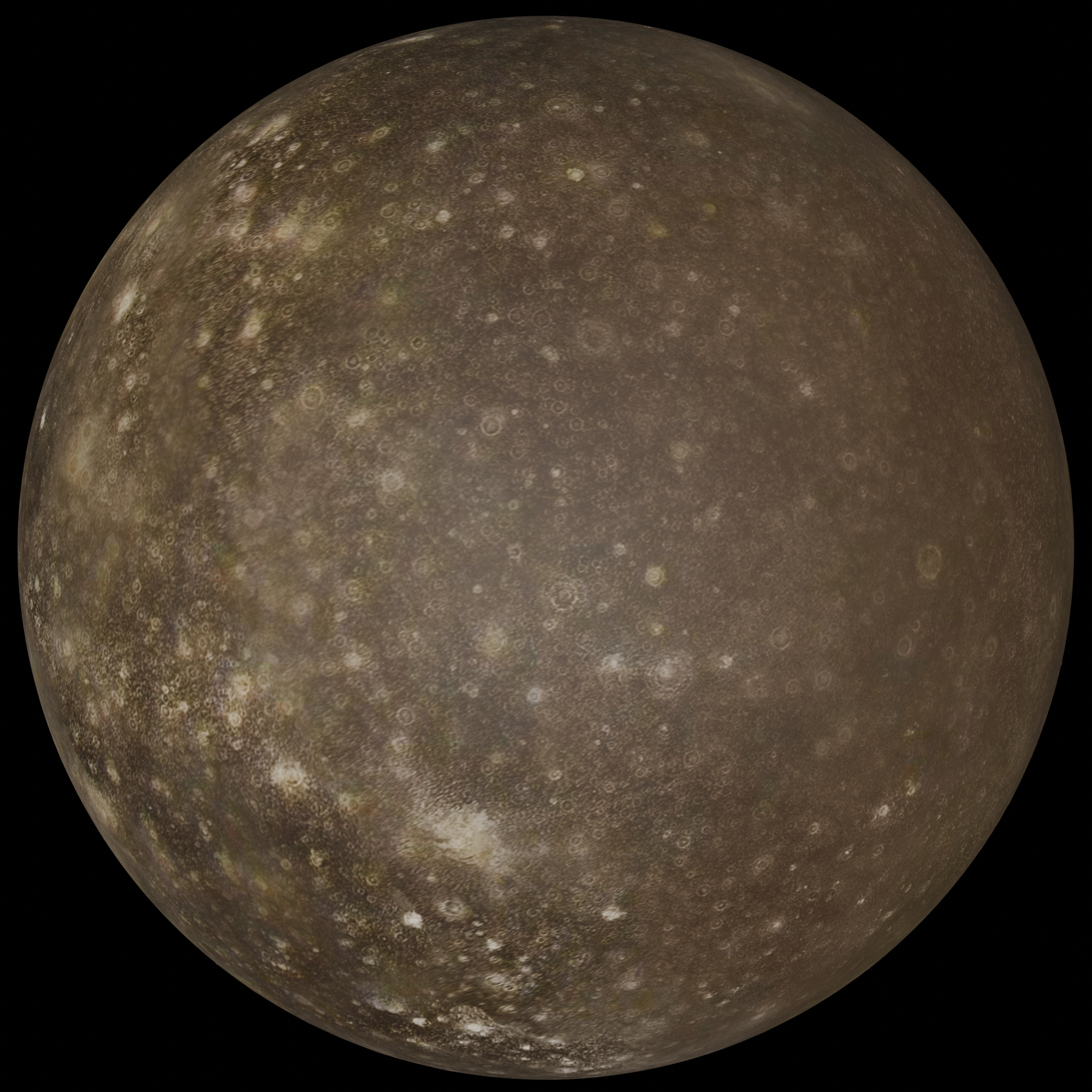

This is a list of named geological features on Callisto, a moon of Jupiter. This list is complete as of August 2022.

== Catenae ==
Callistoan catenae (crater chains) are named after rivers, valleys, and ravines in myths and folktales of cultures of the Far North (all current names come from Norse mythology).

Name	Coordinates	Diameter (km)	Approval Date	Namesake	Refs
Eikin Catena	8.90°S 344.50°E	223.10	1997	Eikin	WGPSN
Fimbulthul Catena	8.20°N 295.20°E	287	1997	Fimbulthul	WGPSN
Geirvimul Catena	48.90°N 12.80°E	113.10	1997	Geirvimul	WGPSN
Gipul Catena	68.50°N 305.80°E	641	1997	Gipul	WGPSN
Gomul Catena	35.50°N 312.90°E	342.60	1997	Gomul	WGPSN
Gunntro Catena	19.50°S 16.90°E	149	1997	Gunntro	WGPSN
Sid Catena	49.20°N 256.10°E	81.40	1997	Sid	WGPSN
Svol Catena	10.60°N 322.80°E	161	1997	Svol	WGPSN

== Faculae ==
Faculae (bright spots) on Callisto are named after characters related to frost, snow, cold, and sleet from myths and folktales of people of the Far North.

Name	Coordinates	Diameter (km)	Approval Date	Namesake	Refs
Kol Facula	4.50°N 282.70°E	390	2006	Kol, Icelandic frost or storm giant	WGPSN

== Large ring features ==
The enormous impact-related ring features on Callisto are named after places (other than rivers, valleys and ravines) from myths and folktales of the Far North.

Name	Coordinates	Diameter (km)	Approval Date	Namesake	Refs
Adlinda	48.50°S 324.40°E	840	1979	Adlinda (Inuit)	WGPSN
Asgard	32.20°N 220.10°E	1400	1979	Asgard (Norse)	WGPSN
Utgard	45.00°N 226.00°E	610	2000	Utgard (Norse)	WGPSN
Valhalla	14.70°N 304.00°E	3000	1979	Valhalla (Norse)	WGPSN
