= Gomul Catena =

Chain of craters on Callisto

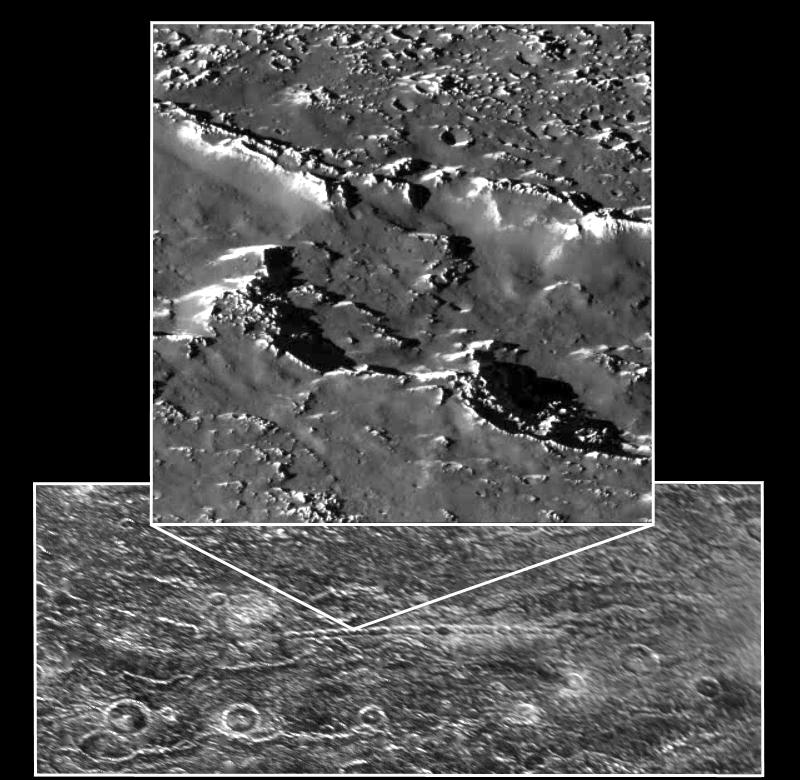
Gomul Catena on Callisto, imaged by Galileo on 4 November 1996.

Gomul Catena is a chain of craters on Jupiter's moon, Callisto. It is situated in the northern part of Valhalla multi-ring structure. The craters in the catena seem to have formed from east to west. Such features are thought to originate as secondary craters or due to fragmentation of the impactor.

Gomul Catena is named after a Norse river Gomul.
