= Valhalla (crater) =

Large multi-ring impact crater on Jupiter's moon Callisto

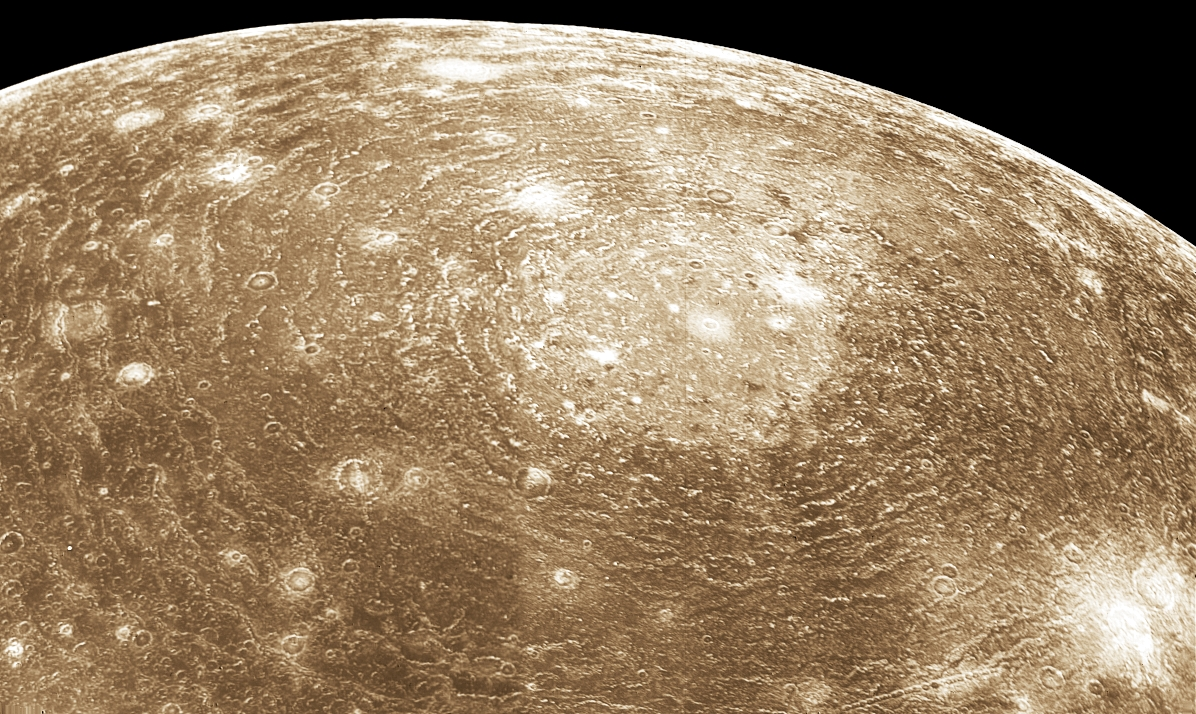
- The crater as seen by Voyager 1
- Location: Callisto
- Diameter: c. 3,800 km
- Age: c. 3 billion years
- Discoverer: Voyager 1 in 1979

Valhalla (/vælˈhælə/ val-HAL-ə) is a vast multi-ring basin on Callisto, the outermost of the Galilean moons. It is the largest multi-ring impact basin in the Solar System. It is named after Valhalla, the hall where warriors are taken after death in Norse mythology.

Valhalla consists of a bright central region 360 km across, an inner ridge and trough zone, and striking concentric rings extending up to around 1,900 km from the center. Several large impact craters and crater chains are superimposed on Valhalla Crater. The multi-ring system may have formed as semi-liquid or liquid material underlying the brittle lithosphere punctured by the impactor slumped towards the center of the crater following the impact.

== General description ==
Valhalla is the largest multi-ring basin on Callisto and in the Solar System (with diameter up to 3,800 km). It was discovered by Voyager 1 in 1979 and is located on the leading hemisphere of Callisto, in its Jupiter facing quadrant slightly to the north of the equator (at about 18°N latitude and 57°W longitude). From the geological point of view, Valhalla consists of three zones: the central zone, the inner ridge-and-trough zone, and the outer trough zone.

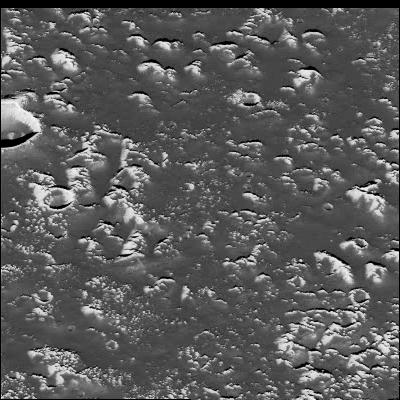
The central part of Valhalla structure on Callisto. Bright knobs surrounded by smooth dark plains are visible.

The inner zone (diameter of about 360 km) is an example of a palimpsest: a high albedo circular feature of impact origin. The surface in the central zone is relatively smooth and has a mottled appearance. Many impact craters inside it have dark halos. At the high resolution achieved in some Galileo images the central part of Valhalla looks like a knobby terrain, where bright knobs are surrounded by dark smooth plains; there is noticeable deficit of small impact craters.

The inner ridge and trough zone surrounds the central palimpsest. The ridges that immediately surround the central zone have steep flanks facing outward. These scarps, when studied at a high resolution, turned out to be discontinuous consisting of a series of small bright knobs surrounded by the smooth dark material. They are obviously very degraded structures. The troughs that are situated further from the center than ridges are sinuous and appear to be graben (about 20 km wide). The inner trough zone extends up to 950 km from the center of Valhalla.

The outer trough zone has a radius of 1,500 to 1,900 km. Its outer boundary is not well defined. It consists of wide double walled sinuous lineaments (troughs), which like the inner troughs appear to be graben. Although these grabens are wider (up to 30 km) than those in the inner trough zone, they are severely degraded, and are made of a series of small knobs, much like their inner counterparts. There are no indications of volcanic flows or other signs of endogenic activity associated with the graben on the high resolution Galileo images as was suggested based on the low resolution Voyager images. So, all structures within Valhalla basin have impact or tectonic origin.

== Craters ==
Several prominent impact craters and catenae are located within Valhalla structure. At the northern margin of it Gomul Catena can be found as well as Egdir and Mimir craters. The catena consists of a linear sequence of impact craters and probably resulted from a break-up of a comet (like comet Shoemaker-Levy 9). To the south of Valhalla there are Sarakka and Nar impact craters; to the east of it (at the boundary between the inner and outer trough zones) are Sculd and Svol Catena. To the west of Valhalla another large multi-ring basin—Asgard—can be found. The central parts of Valhalla are less cratered than the old plain outside the structure. This indicates that Valhalla is significantly younger than Callisto itself.

== Origin ==
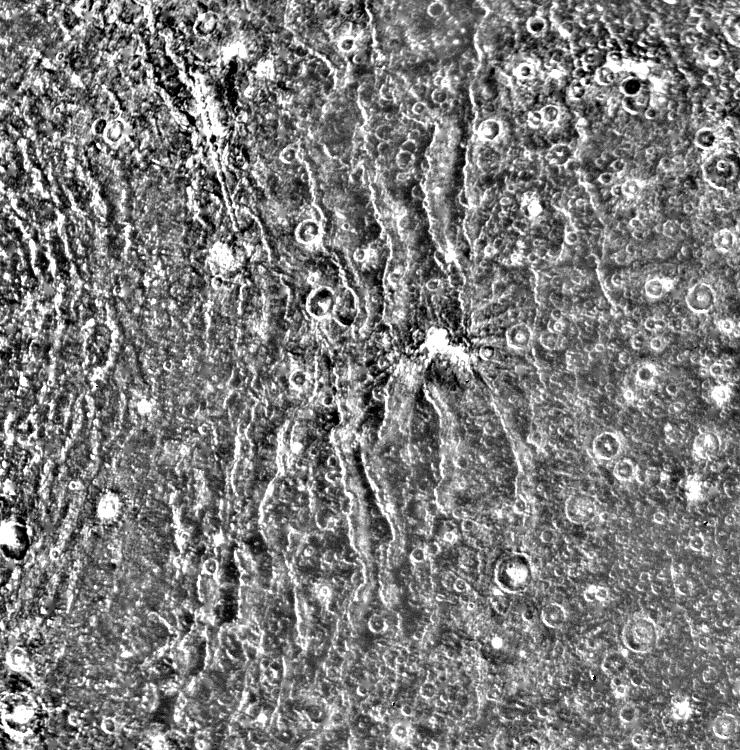
The troughs (faults) surrounding Valhalla

The Valhalla multi-ring structure (like other Callistan multi-ring basins) probably resulted from a giant impact, which punctured the outer ridged lithosphere of the moon and entered the underlying layer consisting of a much softer material. The latter can be warm ice or even a liquid ocean, the existence of which can be inferred from magnetometric data. The formation of a ringed structure is caused by the concentric failure of the brittle outer shell (lithosphere) following the impact, after the soft material underlying the lithosphere flows towards the center to fill the cavity excavated by the impact. The absolute age of the Valhalla structure is not known; however, it is the youngest such feature among the five known multi-ring structures on Callisto. Estimates of its age vary from 2 to 4 billion years.

Consistent with this picture, imaging by the Galileo spacecraft found no evidence of disruption of the area of Callisto antipodal to Valhalla. Such disrupted terrain normally forms as a result of focusing of the seismic energy at the opposite point after the impact. The absence of such disruption supports the presence of a subsurface ocean, which would have absorbed much of the seismic energy, at the time of Valhalla's formation.

== In fiction ==
Kim Robinson's Galileo's Dream (2009) contains a detailed description of a large city built around the concentric rings of Valhalla in the 29th century. The same city is briefly mentioned in Robinson's 2312.

== See also ==
- Adlinda (crater) – Crater on Callisto
- List of geological features on Callisto
- Peak ring (crater) – Roughly circular ring within an impact crater
