= Adlinda (crater) =

Crater on Callisto

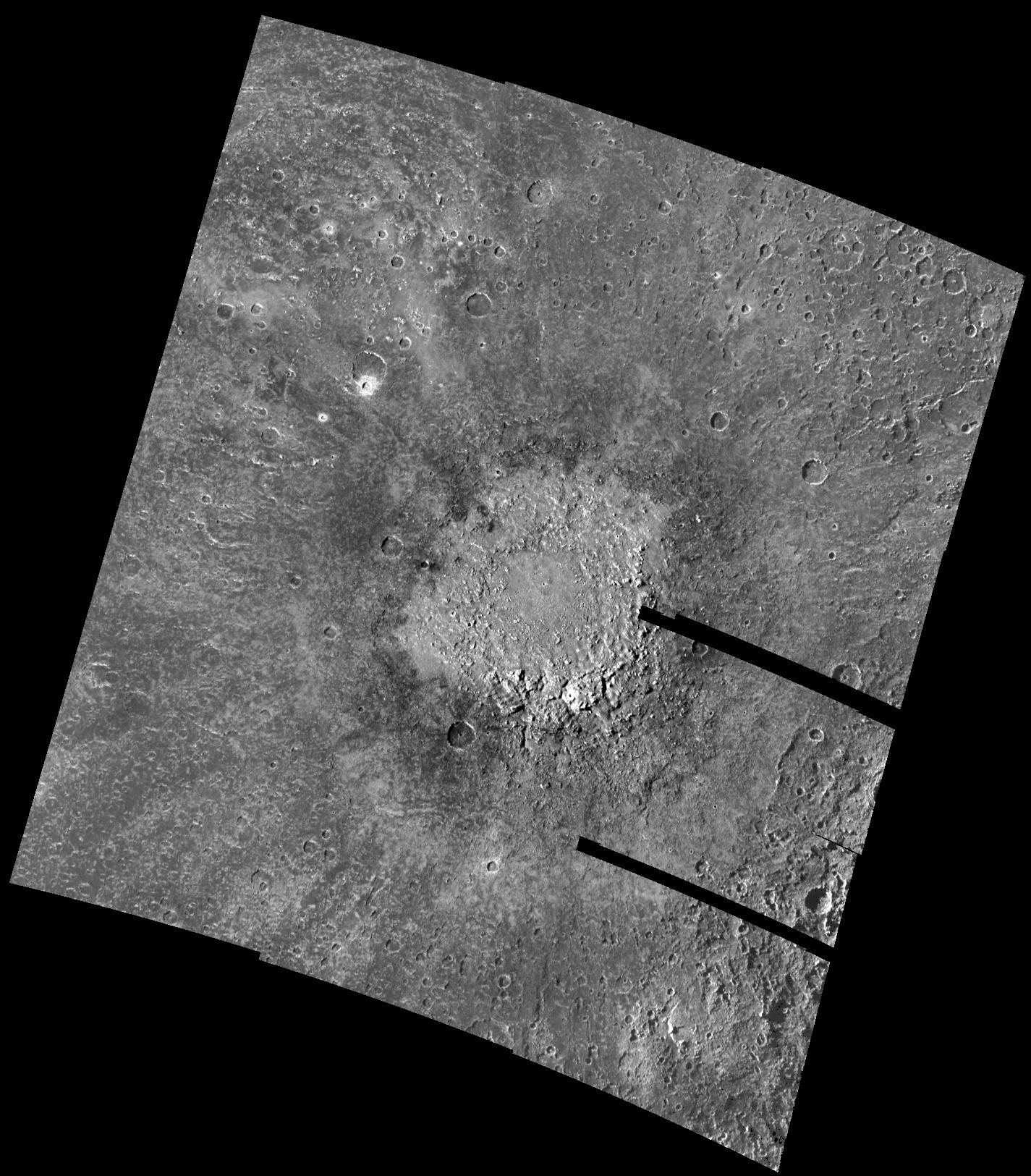
Galileo image of Adlinda (upper left) and Lofn (center), taken on 6 May 1997.

Adlinda is the third-largest multiring structure (impact crater) on Jupiter's moon Callisto, measuring roughly 1000 km in diameter. It is situated in the southern hemisphere of Callisto. The name is taken from Inuit mythology.

The relatively young, large Lofn impact crater is superposed on Adlinda. The bright deposits from this crater cover about 30% of the surface of Adlinda hindering detailed study. Lofn is an example of a flat floored impact crater.
