= Tindr (crater) =

Crater on Callisto

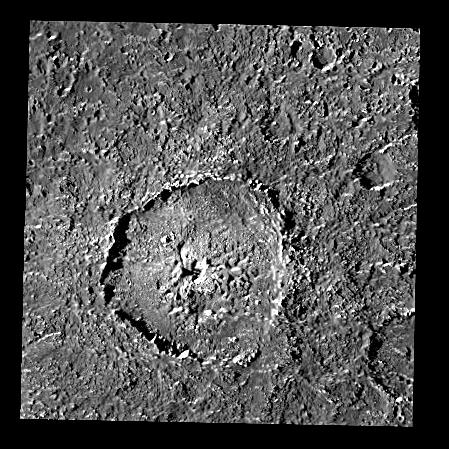
Galileo image of Tindr

Tindr is a crater on Jupiter's moon Callisto. It is named after one of the ancestors of Ottar in Norse mythology. This is an example of a central pit impact crater.
