= Asgard (crater) =

Callistoan multi-ringed impact basin

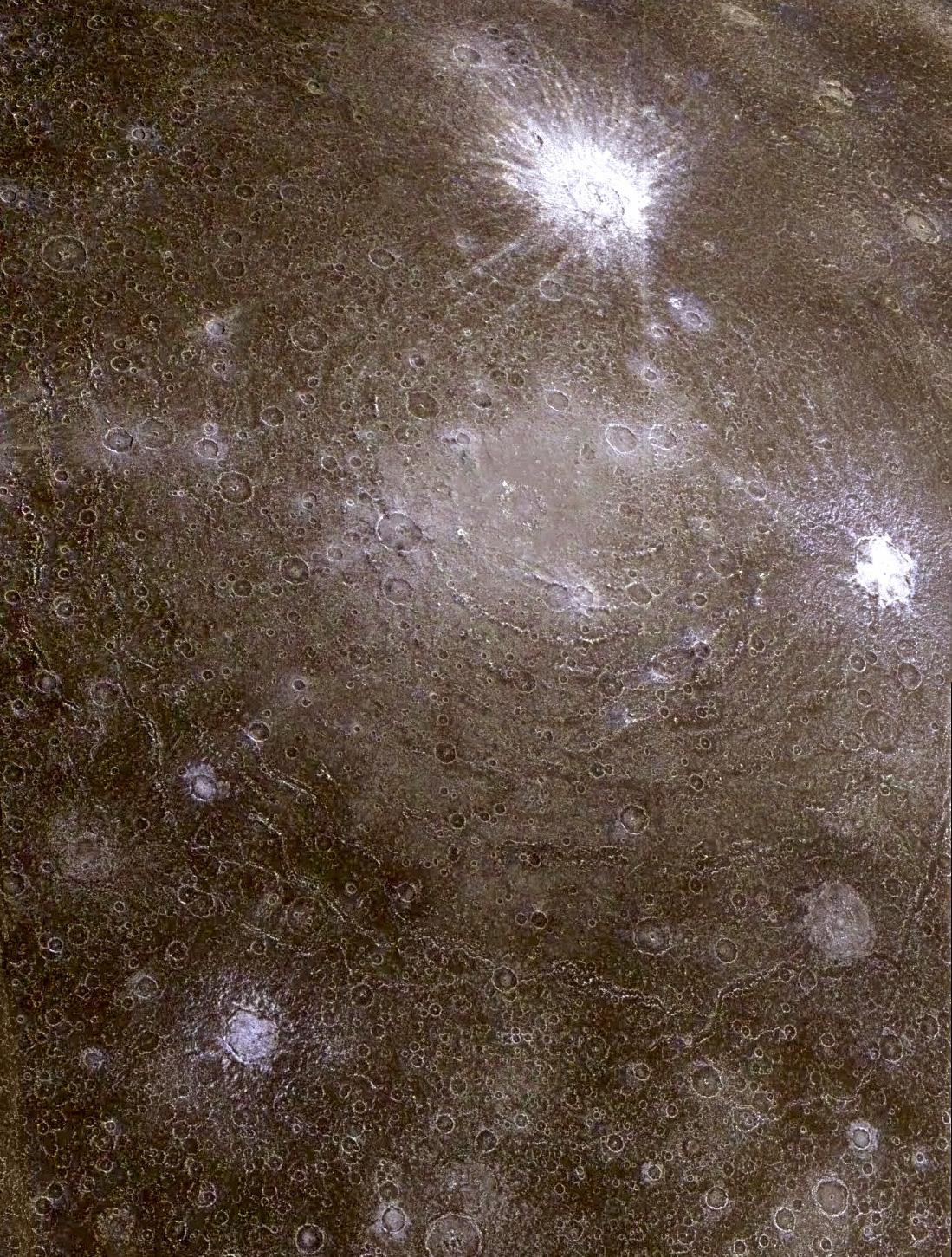
- In this Galileo image, Asgard is centered in the pale region, just to the upper right of the image center, with surrounding concentric rings. Utgard is a smaller multi-ring structure superposed on the northern part of Asgard. The bright features are more recent impact craters, including Burr near the top, Tornarsuk at right, Njord below Tornarsuk, and Omolʹ above Tornarsuk to the right of Burr
- Location: Callisto
- Coordinates: 32.20°N 139.90°E
- Diameter: 1,400 km (870 mi)
- Eponym: Asgard

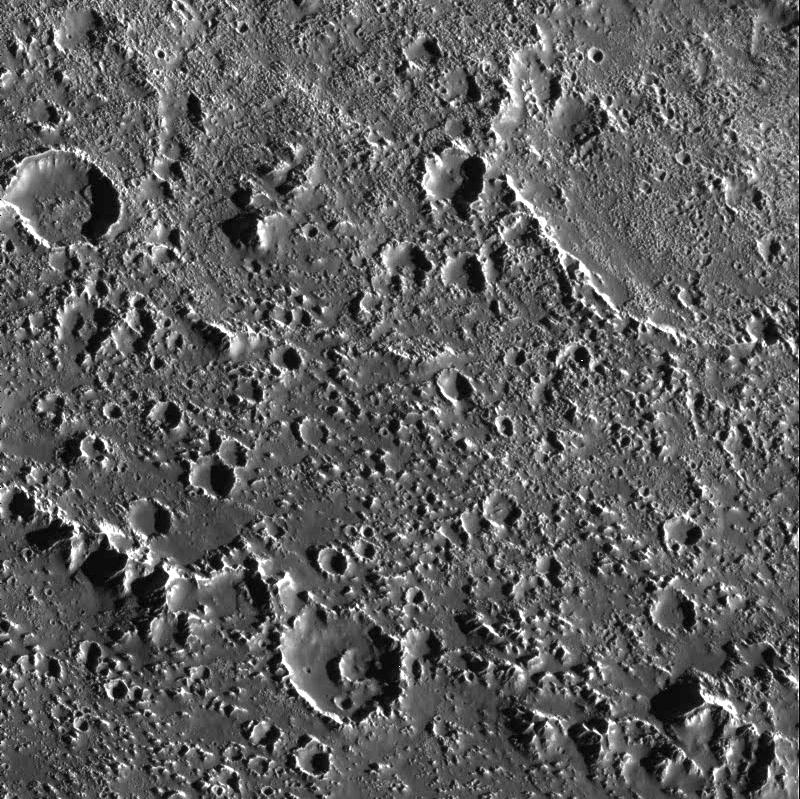
Textured terrain in Callisto's Asgard basin

Asgard is the second largest multi-ringed basin (large impact crater) on Jupiter's moon Callisto. It is named after Asgard, the realm of the gods in Norse mythology. Asgard is located at a latitude of 32° and a longitude of 142°. The estimated crater retention age of Asgard is circa 4.04. The central part of Asgard is dominated by the domed Doh impact crater. Since multi-ring basins are some of the largest, oldest, and rarest types of craters, they are less understood. Images were first taken of the Asgard basin by the Voyager 1 spacecraft. Later, the Galileo orbiter had several close flybys near Callisto producing several images with resolution as high as 88 m/pixel. Based on Galileo data, the central region of Asgard is expected to be ~ 250 km in diameter, the ring structure reaches ~ 1880 km in diameter, and the crater is suspected to have a ~675 km rim diameter. The outer rim is representative of the ejecta or secondaries with the radii of ~675 km. The basin appears to have a shallow depth. Although hypothesized, there is no distinct crater rim, in the traditional sense, since most of the rings look similar.

== General Makeup ==
Asgard is thought to consist of three major regions. Moving from the center outward, there are interior bright plains, followed by a zone of inward facing cliffs, and a zone of discontinuous concentric troughs. The inner facies have the highest albedo with its bright regions. The outer facies are expected to possibly be parts of the ejecta blanket from the initial Asgard impact. The topography is different than many of the basins seen on other inner planets. The surface of Callisto consists mostly of water ice and is not very strong. Typically, an impact of such massive size would cause high mountains but due to the weakness of the surface the basins contain relatively low vertical relief.

Away from the center of the Asgard basin and near the rim of the effective crater of Asgard is a region lacking in craters. This younger surface is the result of some resurfacing event which is predicted to be the large Asgard impact or sublimation degradation. By comparison, craters between 1–3 km are less commonly found outside of the Asgard basin's outer ring than inside the multi-ring structure. This depletion of crafter with a factor of 3.5 within the basin implies that the basin was formed after ~ 2/3 of all Callisto's craters.

== Research Using Asgard ==
By using the width of graben at Asgard, properties about the lithosphere have been deduced. The lithospheric thickness and thermal gradient at formation has been constrained. The James Webb Space Telescope has been used on Callisto to determine how carbon rich the surface is and how much CO_{2} is in the atmosphere. The signatures of CO_{2} were weak on the leading hemisphere except for some peaking in the Asgard impact basin. This has led to a better understating of regional geological terrain's effect on CO_{2} on Callisto. More is to be uncovered with the ESA JUICE (Jupiter Icy Moon Explorer) mission. Asgard also has a reflectance level quantitatively 0.03 higher than surrounding terrain making it interesting for determining the grain size or mixture of the greying agent present on the surface of Callisto.

== Utgard ==
A smaller multi-ring structure is superposed on the northern part of Asgard. It is called Utgard (also from Norse mythology) and measures around 600 km (370 mi) in diameter. Utgard is the fourth largest multi-ring feature on Callisto. A substantial part of the central region of Utgard is covered with deposits from the relatively young Burr crater.
