= Adlivun =

Spirits in Inuit mythology

In Inuit religion, Adlivun (those who live beneath us, from at ~ al below, -lirn in a certain direction, -vun possessive first person plural; also known as Idliragijenget) are the spirits of the departed who reside in the underworld, and by extension the underworld itself, located beneath the land and the sea. The souls are purified there, in preparation for the travel to the Land of the Moon (Quidlivun or Qudlivun, the uppermost ones), where they find eternal rest and peace. Sedna, Torngarsuk and the tornat (spirits of animals and natural formations) and tupilaq (souls of dead people) live in Adlivun, which is usually described as a frozen wasteland. Sedna is the ruler of the land, and is said to imprison the souls of the living as part of the preparation for the next stage of their journey.

When an Inuk dies, they are wrapped in caribou skin and buried. Elderly corpses have their feet pointing towards west or southwest, while children's feet point east or southeast and young adults towards the south. Three days of mourning follow, with relatives staying in the deceased's hut with nostrils closed by a piece of caribou skin. After three days, the mourners ritualistically circle the grave three times, promising venison to the spirit, which is then brought when the grave is visited.

The psychopomps Pinga and Anguta bring the souls of the dead to Adlivun, where they must stay for one year before moving on.

== Notes ==
=== Bibliography ===
- Boas, Franz (1888). Smithsonian Institution (ed.). The Central Eskimo: Sixth Annual Report of the Bureau of Ethnology to the Secretary of the Smithsonian Institution, 1884-1885. Washington (District of Columbia), USA: Government Printing Office. OCLC 16737743 – via Project Gutenberg.
- Gabryl, Franciszek (1895). Skład Główny w Księgarni G. Gebethnera i spółki (ed.). Nieśmiertelność duszy ludzkiej w świetle rozumu i nowoczesnej nauki [The human soul's immortality enlightened through reason and modern science] (in Polish). Kraków, PL: Druk. Wł. L. Anczyc i Sp. oai:rcin.org.pl:1834 – via RCIN-IGIPZ - Digital Repository of Scientific Institutions.
- Leach, Maria (1954). The Beginning: Creation Myths Around the World. New York City (New York), USA: Funk & Wagnalls. OCLC 528661 – via Google Books.
