= Idliragijenget =

Inuit deity

In Inuit mythology, Idliragijenget is the goddess of the ocean.

As Idliragijenget ("she who sleeps in the house of the wind"), she is the ruler of the underworld, Adlivun. She and her father Savirqong occupy opposite sides of a large house. Since their apotheosis, they must live in the same place but keep apart that summer and winter may not get mixed...Like his daughter, he has but one eye,—the moon. The dead, seized by Anguta, are carried thither.

— H. Newell Wardle (1900)

Sedna is the mistress of one of the countries to which the souls go after death. It has been related in the foregoing tradition of Sedna and the fulmar that she descended to Adlivun; since that time she has been the mistress of the country and when invoked as such has the name of Idliragijenget...There she lives with her father, each occupying one side of it...Like her, the father has only one eye.

— Franz Boas (1888)
