= Inua =

Concept of inuit mythology

In Inuit mythology, an inua (ᐃᓄᐊ; plural inuat ᐃᓄᐊᑦ) is a spirit or soul that exists in all people, animals, lakes, mountains, and plants. This is not an individual soul, but rather "the vital force representing a chain or continuum of all the individual spirits of that genus which had lived, were living, or were to live."

Among the Yup'ik near Kuskokwim Bay of Coastal Alaska, the word yua (absolutive case form of the word yuk "human; human-like spirit") has similar connotations as that of the Iñupiaq of Northern Alaska, who, similarly to the Inuit, call it iñua or inua. This meaning is based in a common understanding of most Arctic peoples, including both the Yup'iak and Iñupiaq, that "all the world is animate, and that animals have souls or spirits", a foundational belief of the continuum and inter-connectivity of all life and spirit of all that is, has been, and is yet to be. The concept is similar to mana.

Masks worn by shamans and non-shamanic dancers can represent animal spirits. Spirit masks represent the inua of the genus, not of an individual of that genus. A spirit mask of a seal, for example, represents an abstraction or communal essence of the spirit of all seals.

For Arctic people, human and animals are equal in that all life shares a common kind of soul or "life essence" (inua). This creates a predicament that, in order to survive, people must kill other creatures that are like them. Recognition of this dilemma lies at the centre of hunting practice, which is based upon respect and reciprocity. The hunter will only succeed if the animal chooses to give its life as a gift in return for moral and respectful behaviour on the part of the whole community. For example, after a seal has been killed fresh water is poured into its mouth so that its soul will not be thirsty and it will tell the other seals of the respect shown to it.

Inua were sometimes personified in mythology, as in Tarqiup Inua ("Master of the Moon") or infrequently Silap Inua. Sila has a wide variety of meanings. Discussing the meaning of Silap Inua, sometimes translated as "the owner of sila" or possessor of spirit, it has been suggested that Silap Inua may more appropriately indicate animation by or participation in "the Life-Giving Spirit."
