= Aua (angakkuq) =

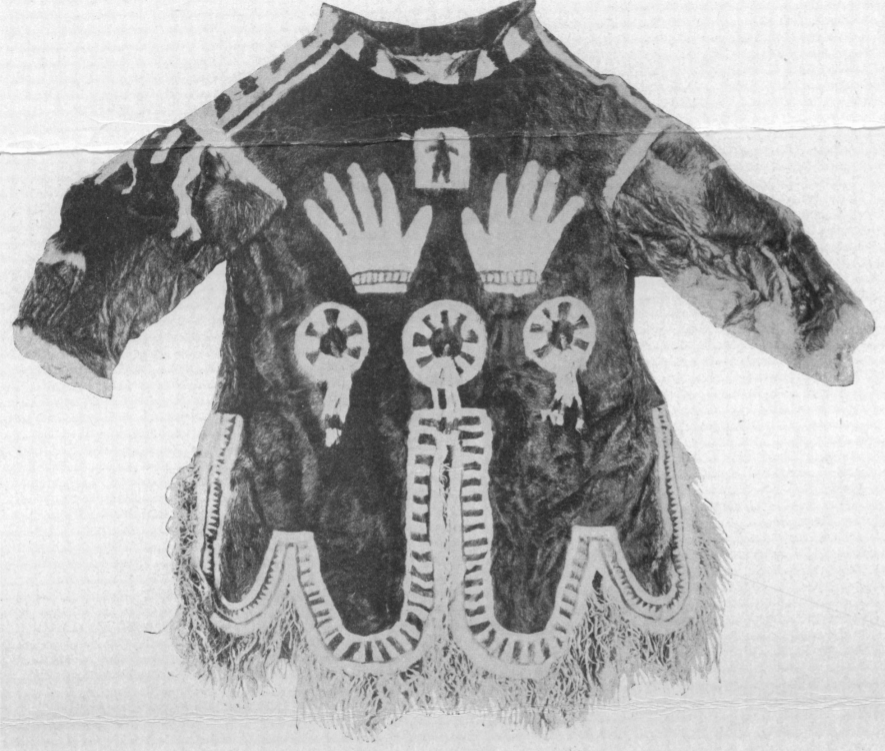
Front side of Aua's famous shamanistic coat

Aua (also transcribed Awa and Ava) (circa 1870, Igloolik area – after 1922) was an Inuk angakkuq (medicine man) known for his anthropological input to Greenland anthropologist Knud Rasmussen. As a spiritual healer practicing into the 1920s, Aua provided perspective on Inuit mythology at a time when it was being subsumed by the introduction of Christianity. Aua told the story of his cousin's mother Uvavnuk, whose song "The Great Earth" is still popular.

Aua was married to Orulo and they had four children.

His encounters with the Danish explorer were fictionalised in the 2006 film The Journals of Knud Rasmussen, by the Inuit team who had produced Atanarjuat: The Fast Runner.

== Sources ==
- Penny Petrone. Northern Voices: Inuit Writing in English. University of Toronto Press, 1992. ISBN 9780802077172. Pg 21.
