= Uvavnuk =

Inuk poet

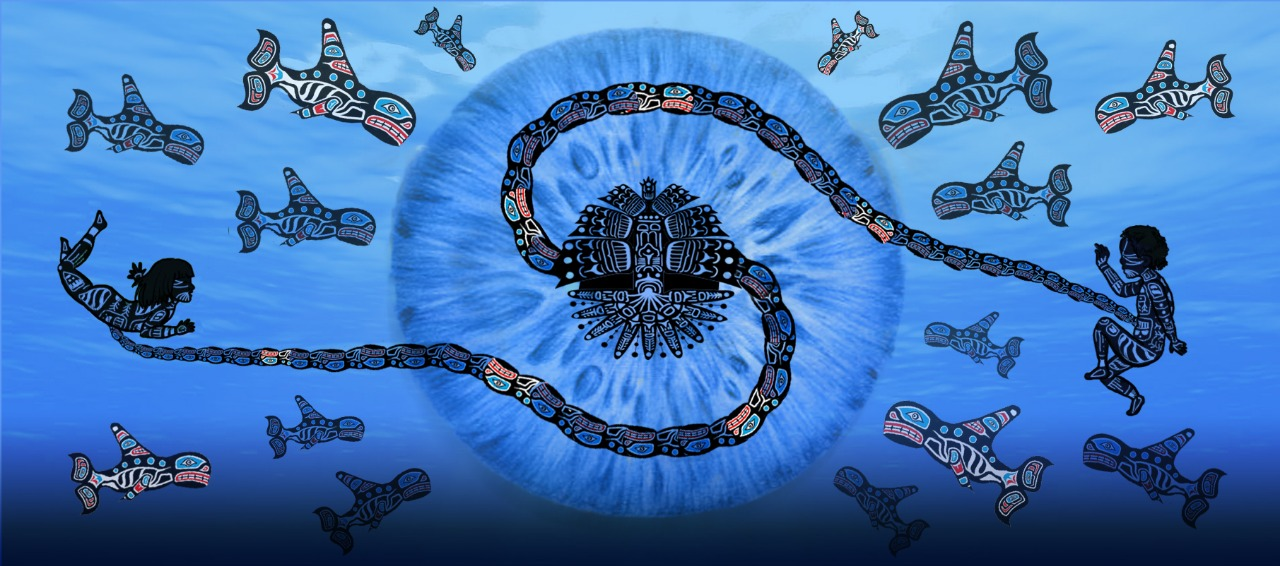
Illustration of The Song of Uvavnuk by Fiann Paul and Natalie Caroline

Uvavnuk was an Inuk woman born in the 19th century, now considered an oral poet. The story of how she became an angakkuq (spiritual healer), and the song that came to her, were collected by European explorers of Arctic Canada in the early 1920s. Her shamanistic poem-song, best known as "Earth and the Great Weather", has been anthologised many times.

== Background ==
Uvavnuk's story was written down by the explorer Knud Rasmussen, who grew up speaking Greenlandic, which is closely related to Inuktitut. Her story was told by Aua, a cousin of her son Niviatsian, both of whom were also spiritual healers. Aua acted as an informant for Rasmussen, who was collecting cultural material such as folktales and songs.

The two men met in February 1922, in the vicinity of Lyon Inlet, north of Hudson Bay. Given this location, Uvavnuk has been considered an Iglulingmiut, a person from Iglulik. Aua was then living in a settlement of 16 people, all related to him and thus to Uvavnuk.

Rasmussen's version of her story appears in The Intellectual Culture of the Copper Eskimos (1932), also translated from the Danish as The Intellectual Culture of the Iglulik Eskimos. This is the ninth in his ten-volume The Fifth Thule Expedition 1921-1924. So the story was spoken in Inuktitut, written down and eventually published in Danish, and quickly translated into English for the publication of the international edition of his magnum opus.

Another version of Uvavnuk's story was written by one of Rasmussen's companions on the Fifth Thule Expedition, Peter Freuchen. In his 1961 Book of Eskimos, after half a century living in the Arctic, Freuchen tells the story slightly differently, calling it "grotesque in its mysticism".

== Her transformation story ==
Rasmussen entitled this story "Uvavnuk is struck by a ball of fire", which he thinks is a meteor. This is the only story about her in that volume of the Thule Report; what is given below is the first translation from the Danish, by William John Alexander Worster (1883–1929).

Uvavnuk had gone outside the hut one winter evening to make water. It was particularly dark that evening, as the moon was not visible. Then suddenly there appeared a glowing ball of fire in the sky, and it came rushing down to earth straight towards her. She would have got up and fled, but before she could pull up her breeches, the ball of fire struck her and entered into her. At the same moment she perceived that all within her grew light, and she lost consciousness. But from that moment also she became a great shaman. She had never before concerned herself with the invocation of spirits, but now imiEru'jap inua, the spirit of the meteor, had entered into her and made her a shaman. She saw the spirit just before she fainted. It had two kinds of bodies, that rushed all glowing through space; one side was a bear, the other was like a human being; the head was that of a human being with the tusks of a bear.

Uvavnuk had fallen down and lost consciousness, but she got up again, and without knowing what she was doing, came running into the house; she came into the house singing:... there was nothing that was hidden from her now, and she began to reveal all the offences that had been committed by those in the house. Thus she purified them all. ...

But there was this remarkable thing about Uvavnuk, that as soon as she came out of her trance, she no longer felt like a shaman; the light left her body and she was once more quite an ordinary person with no special powers. Only when the spirit of the meteor lit up the spirit light within her could she see and hear and know everything, and became at once a mighty magician. Shortly before her death she held a grand seance, and declared it was her wish that mankind should not suffer want, and she "manivai", i.e. brought forth from the interior of the earth all manner of game which she had obtained from Takånakapsåluk. This she declared, and after her death, the people of her village had a year of greater abundance in whale, walrus, seal and caribou than any had ever experienced before.

== Interpretations of the story ==
Uvavnuk's story has been described and interpreted in detail from several angles. In a 1989 essay, Rudy Wiebe uses the story as "a possible way to understanding, to developing an appreciation of Canada's Arctic.". Novelist and critic Robert Kroetsch builds off this in "An Arkeology of (My) Canadian Post-modern", using it to justify sweeping statements such as "The Arctic for Wiebe announces marginality on a grand scale, and marginality is the stuff of the Canadian experience." Kroetsch claims that Wiebe sees Uvavnuk "not as an agent of transcendence or control but rather as a presence in the world".

Bernard Saladin d'Anglure, a Canadian anthropologist and ethnographer who speaks Inuktitut, used Uvavnuk's story in 1994 as an example of "a relationship between shamanism and the 'third gender' among the Inuit". Canadian cultural anthropologist Barbara Tedlock links Uvavnuk's bodily possession (i.e. the unconsciousness) with the resulting shamanic knowledge. Mysticism: Experience, Response, and Empowerment (1996) describes Uvavnuk's experience in terms of "telepathic sensitivity" helping her know the "thoughts and hidden actions of others".

== Her poem or song ==
The words that Uvavnuk sang are known by several names: "The Great Sea", "The Song of Uvavnuk", "Earth and the Great Weather". There are an unknown number of versions in English, some via the Danish intermediary and some direct from Inuktitut, but poet John Robert Colombo says "The song's power is such that its spirit vaults the hurdles of translation with ease."

Rasmussen's companion Freuchen, mentioned above, translates "the longest and most moving" version of the song, according to Colombo. In part:

The great sea moves me, sets me adrift.
It moves me like algae on stones in running brook water.
The vault of heaven moves me.
Mighty weather storms through my soul.
It carries me with it.
Trembling with joy.

A translation by Tegoodlejak appears in Canadian Eskimo Art (1970) by James Houston. Tom Lowenstein, a British poet who for many years lived in the village of Point Hope, Alaska, translated and reprinted Uvavnuk's song in 1973.

Uvavnuk's poem has appeared in collections such as Northern Voices: Inuit Writing in English (1992), Women in praise of the sacred: forty-three centuries of spiritual poetry by women (edited by Jane Hirshfield in 1994) and The Enlightened Heart: An Anthology of Sacred Poetry (edited by Stephen Mitchell in 2009). Northern Voices (which, despite the subtitle, draws on oral poetry as well) was edited by literary scholar Penny Petrone as a pioneer work in the critical study of aboriginal literature in Canada.

The poem has been used as a touchstone in contexts as diverse as archaeology ("The distance between an archeologist's experience of the world and that of a particular Inuk's in the past is vast.") and a mystery novel set in modern Alaska. Susan Greenwood, author of Magic, Witchcraft and the Otherworld: An Anthropology, calls the poem "well-known" when she draws on it to describe her understanding of the otherworld.

Colombo begins Dark Visions: Personal Accounts of the Mysterious in Canada with Uvavnuk's song, citing it as an example of "the interrelation between poetic impression and spiritual expression". Outdoor educators have used the poem to link nature and culture. Icelandic explorer Fiann Paul, captain of "The Impossible Row" expedition, recited the poem on camera as he arrived in Antarctica in 2019.

== Audio adaptations ==
Uvavnuk's song, in the original Inuktitut, was incorporated into work by American composer John Luther Adams, Earth and the Great Weather (1995), using her phrase as his title.

Another musical adaptation was in 2006, when Theodore Wiprud composed "Three Mystical Choruses" of five minutes each, based on texts by Rumi, Uvavnuk, and Mahavediyakka. This was a commission from Francisco Núñez for the Young People's Chorus of New York. Wiprud compares Uvavnuk's experience to that of the Virgin Mary at the Magnificat.

The song was used by the peace group Out Beyond Ideas for a 2009 benefit album.

The 1995 "Earth and the Great Weather" recording was subsequently used in the Oscar-winning film The Revenant (2015), as a voiceover for a Pawnee character from the Great Plains thousands of kilometers away, even though the two languages bear no relation to one another.

== See also ==
- Inuit mythology
- Oral history

== Sources ==
- Penny Petrone. Northern Voices: Inuit Writing in English. University of Toronto Press, 1992. ISBN 0-8020-7717-X, 9780802077172. Pg 21.
