= Aipaloovik =

Inuit water deity associated with death

In Inuit mythology, Aipaloovik is an evil sea god associated with death and destruction. He is considered the opposite of Anguta. He is a danger to all fishermen.
