= Silap Inua =

Concept of inuit mythology

In Inuit religion, Silap Inua ('possessor of spirit', ᓯᓚᑉ ᐃᓄᐊ) or Sila ('breath, spirit', ᓯᓪᓚ) (Iñupiaq: siḷam iñua) is similar to mana or ether, the primary component of everything that exists; it is also the breath of life and the method of locomotion for any movement or change. Silla was believed to control everything that goes on in one's life.

== Description ==
Silla is a spirit of the sky, the wind, and the weather. Though identified as male, he is never depicted, and thought to be formless. There are very few myths in which Silla is a character, because he is not thought to have many personality characteristics. He also represents a concept somewhat akin to the Hindu idea of Paramatman, or Emerson’s idea of the great Over soul: Silla is also believed to be the substance which souls are made of. Contrary to the Christian missionaries who have identified Nanook the polar bear spirit as the supreme deity of the Inuit, Silla is much closer to this role. However Silla also has a somewhat malevolent aspect: he is known to lure children away from their play off into the tundra, never to be seen again.

Among the many various Inuit cultures, term silap inua / sila, hillap inua / hilla (among Inuit), siḷam iñua (among Inupiaq), ellam yua / ella (among Yup'ik) is used with some diversity. In many instances it refers “outer space”, “intellect”, “weather”, “sky”, “universe”: there may be some correspondence with the presocratic concept of logos.

Shamanhood among Eskimo peoples was a diverse phenomenon, just like the various Inuit cultures themselves. Among Copper Inuit, shamans were believed to obtain their power from this “Wind Indweller”, thus even their helping spirits were termed as silap inue.

Among Siberian Yupik, [sɬam juɣwa] was depicted as a mighty hunter, catching game just like earthly men, but being capable of controlling whether people paid attention to customs and traditions.

In Sireniki Eskimo language, the word [siˈlʲa] has meanings 'universe', 'outer world', 'space', 'free space', or 'weather'.

== History ==
According to the interpretations of anthropologists, Silla is one of the oldest Inuit deities, but was recently (in the last thousand years) supplanted by Sedna, (the goddess of sea mammals) and the Caribou Mother (the goddess of caribou) when these became the major food sources of the Inuit. Anthropologists believe that the belief is extremely old because of the widespread nature of this deity.

== See also ==
- Inua
- 79360 Sila, a Kuiper Belt object named after Sila
