= Uumarnituq and Aakulujjuusi =

Inuit gender and childbirth story

Uumarnituq and Aakulujjuusi is an unipkaaqtuat, a story in Inuit religion. The tale of the first human parents, Uumarnituq the mother, and Aakulujjuusi the father, is a creation story of how humanity originated. In some tellings, Uumarnituq begins life as a man but turns into a woman after the couple wants to have children. The story serves as an explanation of gender and childbirth.

== Names ==
Uumarnituq, the man who becomes a woman and mother, has spelling variants in English sources, including Uumarniittuq. In one Cumberland Sound variant, they are named Owmirneto.

Aakulujjuusi, the man who becomes a father, has several spelling variants in English sources. These include Aakulukjuusi and Aakuluujusi. In a Cumberland Sound variant, he is named Akkalookjo.

== Versions ==
The creation story is composed from several overlapping short stories from Netsilik groups, the Igloolik area, and other Inuit living in the central Arctic.

=== Prehistory ===
Versions of the tale describe a prehistory of an original earth, with different human groups living there, which was destroyed by an ancient event.

In a telling by Tuulik, from the Netsilik but known to the inhabitants of Igloolik, the original earth was a flat disk surrounded by the sea, balanced on four pillars above a lower world, with four more pillars supporting a celestial world. Humans lived there, but when the pillars supporting the earth collapsed, everyone died and the earth was empty. In a Greenlandic telling, the posts supporting the earth remain old and rotten, and shamans need to replace them periodically to keep the earth standing.

In another Netsilik story, the earth's animals all died when a huge rainstorm flooded the land.

=== Reappearance of humans ===
According to various tellings, Uumarnituq and Aakulujjuusi were the first two humans born after the destruction of the ancient earth, and they became the ancestors of all Inuit. Tellings differ in whether they describe how Uumarnituq began life as a man and became a woman, or whether their children were discovered around the earth or born.

In Natsilingmiut and Iglulingmiut tales, Uumarnituq and Aakulujjuusi appeared, fully formed as adults, from mounds of earth called niaquqtaak. The two men wanted children, so Aakulujjuusi and Uumarnituq had intercourse, and Uumarnituq became pregnant. When it was time to deliver the baby, they realized there was no way for the baby to leave the womb, so Aakulujjuusi created a magic song, an irinaliuti, to transform Uumarnituq into a woman. The song went: "A human being here, a penis here. May its opening be wide and roomy. Opening, opening, opening!" After the song, Uumarnituq became a woman, bore the child, and the three humans became the ancestors of humanity.

==== Parenthood variants ====
In one Cumberland Sound telling, Aakulujjuusi and Uumarnituq were married and Uumarnituq wore her husband's boots, leaving the laces to drag with the top part of the boot lying open. One day, an infant's soul crawled from the ground up the boot lace, into her womb. Children had always been found in the snow, but this child grew in her womb, and Uumarnituq eventually gave birth. The child later explained that the womb had been like living in a small house, and it had grown by eating the food vomited by a dog that came into the house when the parents had cohabited. The child eventually wanted to leave the house to see the world, but when it was born, it realized it couldn't speak, and could only cry.

In another Cumberland Sound telling, Aakulujjuusi and Uumarnituq lived at Kinerto and had no children, until Uumarnituq went out exploring and found a baby girl. She took her home and raised her, and continued to find infant girls and raise them until she had raised four children to adults. Eventually, the first daughter went out early to find a baby, and found an infant boy to raise. When the boy had almost grown up, Uumarnituq and her first two daughters went to find another child, and Uumarnituq found another baby. After that child was raised, the trio again went looking for children, and this time the first daughter found an infant girl. Uumarnituq now felt too old to search for children, but her third and first daughters again found new children to raise. This left Uumarnituq's second daughter childless, so many years later they decided that she should marry the first boy discovered. The pair continued to look for children.

=== Descendants ===
Although some tales say that Uumarnituq bore children from her womb, and Aakulujjuusi and Uumarnituq became the ancestors of Inuit, many stories emphasize how children continued to be found among the snow or the earth. A modern retelling explains that when a woman could not become pregnant, she could go out and search for children. The babies appeared from the earth, covered in willow leaves and lying still until they were adopted.

In one variant, there was no death or war at the time of Uumarnituq and Aakulujjuusi. Eventually their descendants grew so rapidly that the deities feared the earth would be destroyed again. Uumarnituq, now an elder, chanted a new irinaliuti in response, saying "Now we shall have death! Now we shall have war!" Aakulujjuusi disagreed with this change and cried out, but was too late to stop the change. However, Aakulujjuusi was able to preserve dying human souls by enabling an afterlife or reincarnation.

== Documented tales ==
Stories about Uumarnituq and Aakulujjuusi were told by Tuulliq and Unaliq, two Netsilik immigrants from Naujaat, then known as Repulse Bay, who had moved to Igloolik. Their stories were written down by Knud Rasmussen in 1929. These versions included the earth's pre-historical destruction by the pillar's instability, and Uumarnituq's transformation from a man into a woman. Rasmussen also said that these tales were well-known to the Iglulingmiut.

Uumarnituq and Aakulujjuusi's emergence from the earth was also told by Ulluriaq, an angakkuq (Inuit shaman from Igloolik, and documented by Agiaq.

The Cumberland Sound variant stories were told by Inuit living on Baffin Island. They shared these with Captain J. Mutch, and the stories were later published by Franz Boas.

Iglulingmiut tales of Uumarnituq and Aakulujjuusi are also mentioned in published work from Guy Mary-Rousselière. The Aivilingmiut living on Southampton Island also told of Uumarnituq and Aakulujjuusi, and this is mentioned in Edmund Snow Carpenter's documents.
