= Issitoq =

Inuit deity

In Inuit mythology, Issitoq (also Isitoq) is a deity that punishes those who break taboos. He usually takes the form of a giant flying eye.
