= Caribou mother =

Inuit deity

The Caribou Mother is an Inuit deity who represents the source of caribou, a vital food source for Inuit. She is seen as gigantic, with people and caribou as lice on her enormous body. The Caribou mother is known as one of the oldest Inuit deities. The Caribou Mother was also known as the "owner of all land animals". She was mainly the protector of the caribou and in some texts, the Caribou Mother is referred by the name Pinga. When going out for hunts Inuit believe that the Caribou Mother keeps the herds safe and makes sure that the people are treating the animals properly.
