= Tupilaq =

A monster or carving of one in Inuit religion

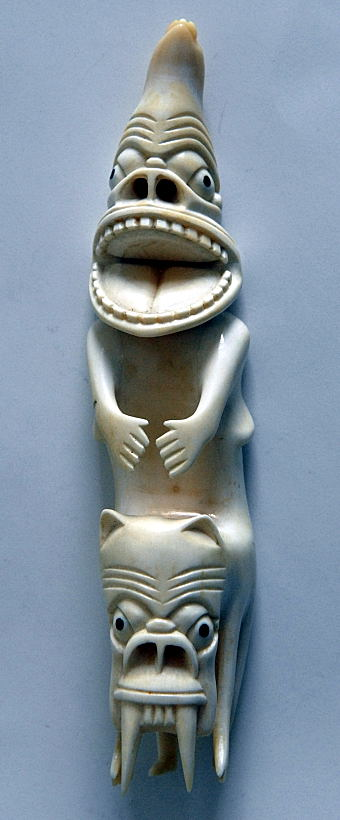
A carved representation of a tupilak, Greenland

A tupilaq (tupilak or ᑐᐱᓚᒃ in Inuktitut syllabics, plural tupilait) is a monster or carving of a monster.

In Inuit religion, especially in Greenland, a tupilaq was an avenging monster fabricated by an angakkuq (a practitioner of witchcraft or shamanism) by using various objects such as animal parts (bone, skin, hair, sinew, etc.) and even parts taken from the corpses of children. The creature was given life by ritualistic chants. It was then placed into the sea to seek and destroy a specific enemy.

The use of tupilaq was considered risky, as if it was sent to destroy someone who had greater magical powers than the one who had formed it, it could be sent back to kill its maker instead, although the maker of the tupilaq could escape by public confession of their deed.

Because tupilaq were made in secret, in isolated places and from perishable materials, none have been preserved. Early European visitors to Greenland, fascinated by the native legend, were eager to see what tupilaq looked like, so Inuit began to carve representations of them out of sperm whale teeth.

Today, tupilaq of many different shapes and sizes are carved from various materials such as narwhal and walrus tusk, wood and caribou antler. They are an important part of Greenlandic Inuit art, and are highly prized as collectibles.

== Publicity versus secrecy ==
The making of a tupilaq started most often at night, in secrecy. The angakkuq (shaman) would don their parka or anorak backwards, with the hood over their face, and engage in sexual contact with the bones used to make a tupilaq, singing and chanting during the entire process, which could take several days. The myth states that the making of a tupilaq was risky to its own maker if the attacked person made it rebound: in this case, public confession was the only rescue. The magic consequences of situations of concealment, and the neutralizing effect of public confession was believed also in several other areas of life, thus, this is an example of the more general topic of secrecy versus publicity.

=== Concealment ===
Concealment or secrecy was believed to create magic consequences in several areas of life:

- Concealed miscarriage or infanticide could give birth to a monster called anngiaq.
- A concealed breach of taboo could bring harm on the community.
- Secrecy was also preliminary for the functioning of so-called formulae (texts or songs used like a charm or spell when endangered, in need, hunting, and in practical everyday situations).

=== Neutralizing effect of public confession ===
Concealment was seen as a preliminary for several magical effects. If this was broken, unintentionally or intentionally, the effect could lose its power.

- Angakkuit in some groups resolved the consequence of taboo breach by achieving public confession of the breacher.
- Animals killed in the course of hunting were believed to have souls as well as humans, and efforts were taken to please and avoid the revenge of hunted animals. The first kill of a young boy would be "neutralized" by public ritual, in which each adult member of the community had to make an incision into the head of the game, or eat a piece from it. Thus, the belief was that public and communal partaking in a dangerous act reduced and neutralized the danger.

== Meanings of the same term in various Inuit cultures ==
Many Inuit cultures had and continue to have similar concepts to the tupilaq. These variants varied, with some being man-made objects, ghost-like beings or souls haunting the living; in some Inuit cultures, related concepts to the tupilaq were dealt with solely by the angakkuq.

Distant groups such as the Kivallirmiut, Greenlandic Inuit, Iglulingmiut Inuit, and Copper Inuit knew the concept of tupilaq, but the details differed:

=== Igloolik ===
The tupilaq was an invisible ghost. Only the angakkuq could notice it. It was the soul of a dead person, which became restless because the breach of some death taboo. It scared game away from the vicinity. Thus, the angakkuq had to help by scaring it away with a knife.

=== Kivallirmiut ===
The tupilaq was also an invisible being. Like a tupilaq of the Igloolik, also the angakkuq was the only one who could see it. It was a chimera-like creature, with human head and parts from different species of animals. It was dangerous, as it could attack the settlement. Then, the angakkuq had to combat it and devour it with their helping spirits.

=== Greenland ===
The tupilaq was manifested in the physical, human-made object. It was made by people to the detriment of their enemies. It was a puppet-like thing, but was thought to have magical power over the victim. It might be made from mixed parts of dead animals and dead children.

=== Inuinnait ===
To the Copper Inuit (Inuinnait), the tupilaq, spelt tupilak was similar to the devil of Christianity.

== See also ==
- Anchimayen
- Tikoloshe
- Torngarsuk

== Bibliography ==
- Burch, Ernest S. (junior); Forman, Werner (1988). The Eskimos. Norman, OK: University of Oklahoma Press. ISBN 0-8061-2126-2.
- Kleivan, Inge; B. Sonne (1985). Eskimos: Greenland and Canada. Iconography of religions, section VIII, "Arctic Peoples", fascicle 2. Leiden, The Netherlands: Institute of Religious Iconography • State University Groningen. E.J. Brill. ISBN 90-04-07160-1.
- Rasmussen, Knud (1927). Across Arctic America. New York • London: G.P. Putnams sons.
