= Ahkiyyini =

Skeleton spirit in Inuit mythology

The Ahkiyyini is a skeleton spirit in Inuit folklore. He is the ghost of Alaska, and causes tidal waves and earthquakes by moving his arms.

Other articles state that when alive Ahkiyyini was always dancing and playing music. In death he would use his arm bone as a drum stick and his scapula as a drum. He created music and danced a jig where it would make the ground shake to where boats would overturn.

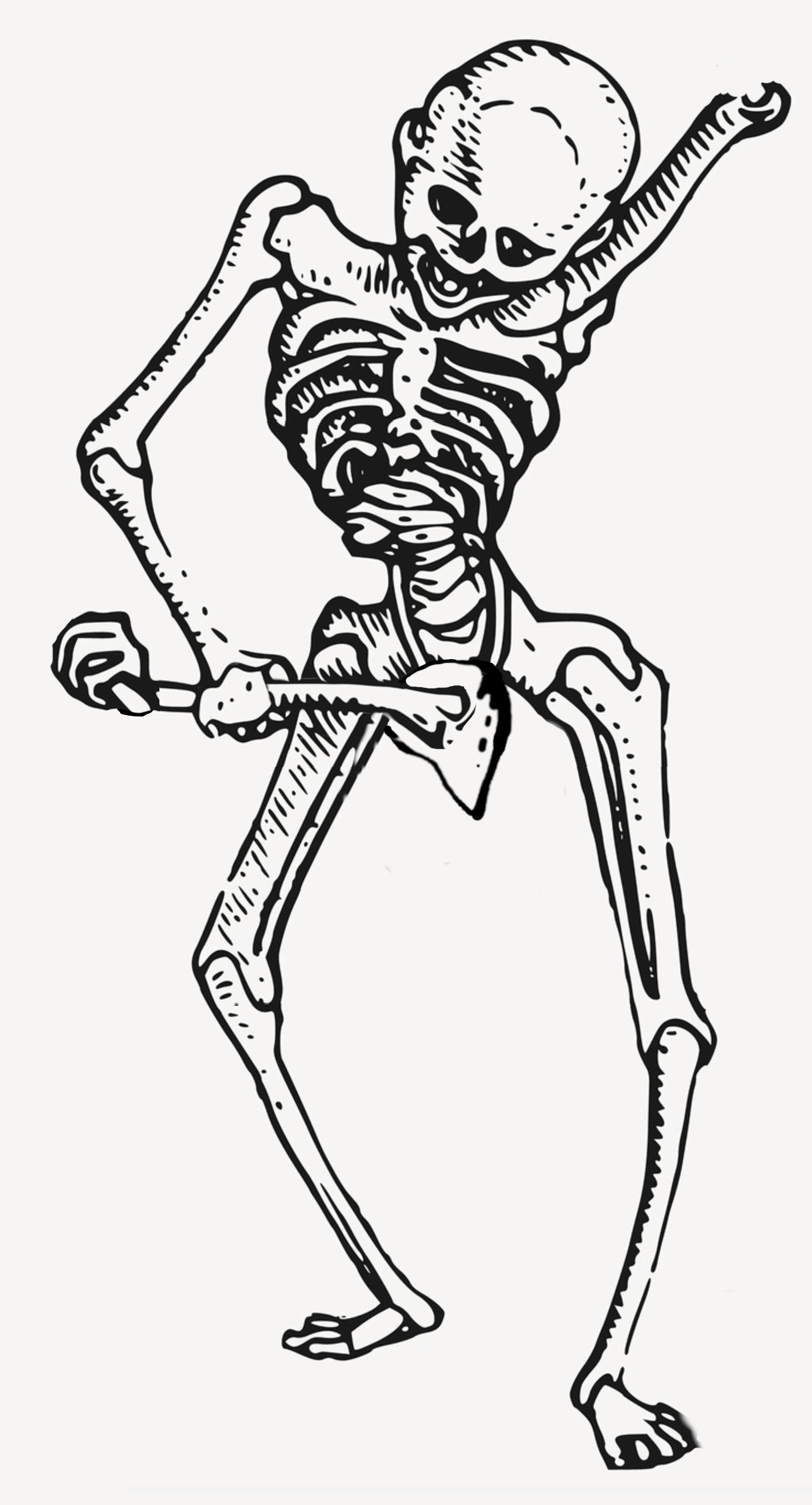
Ahkiyyini
