= Pukkeenegak =

Inuit deity

In Inuit religion, Pukkeenegak is a goddess of children, pregnancy, childbirth and the making of clothes. Considered a benevolent goddess, Pukkeenegak is responsible for childbirth and providing food and clothing materials to Inuit women. She is usually depicted with a tattooed face, wearing tall boots.

As the goddess of hearth and home, Pukkeenegak directs and watches over domestic tasks, such as sewing and cleaning, while also directing and protecting pregnant women, as well as providing for conception and childbirth.
