= Torngarsuk =

Inuit deity

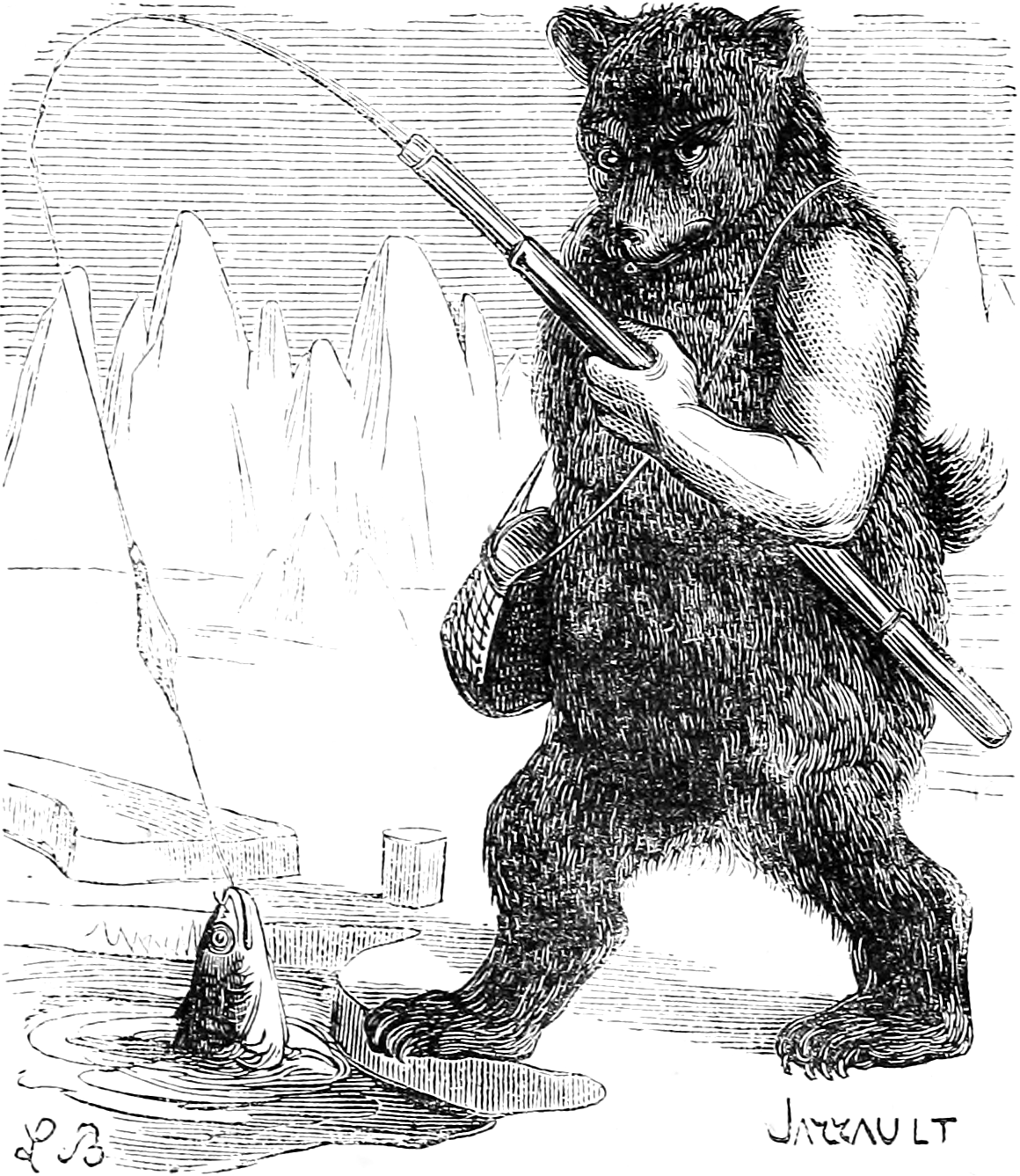
Torngarsuk as depicted in the Dictionnaire Infernal, 1863 edition.

In the Inuit religion, Torngarsuk (or Torngasak) is a sea, death and underworld god, one of the more important deities in the Inuit pantheon. He is said to be the leader of the Tornat, a group of protective gods.

Torngarsuk is listed as a demon or spirit in the Dictionnaire Infernal, a.k.a. Tornatik, Torngarsoak, Torngasoak, Tungrangayak, Tornasuk etc., is a mischievous demon/spirit worshiped by offering in Greenland and the northeastern regions of Canada.

== Description ==
Torngarsuk is the master of whales and seals and most powerful supernatural being in Greenland. He appears in the form of a bear, a one-armed man, or a grand human creature like one of the fingers of a hand. He is considered to be invisible to everyone but the angakkuit (the medicine men or shaman among Inuit peoples).

These conflicting descriptions leave us unsure as to his form, but as a grand spirit or demon Torngarsuk is invoked by fishermen and by the angakoqs" when one falls ill. There are other spirits invisible to everyone but the angakkuq, who teach men how to be happy. They see Torngarsuk as their benefactor; when the Anguekkok call upon him, they ask that if he does not come that he leave them "in the land of plenty".

== Familiar ==
Each angakkuq keeps a familiar spirit in a leather bottle which he evokes and consults like an oracle. This familiar spirit seeks Torngarsuk in a cave and brings good fortune as well as healing power.

== In popular culture ==
- In popular culture, the term or phrase Tornasuk and angekok are best known from a simple and short reference to this part of Inuit mythology and ideology by H. P. Lovecraft in his short-story "The Call of Cthulhu", where these ideas are portrayed as part of an "Eskimo diabolist" cult who revere Cthulhu as an avatar or tangible form of Torngarsuk.
- In Marvel Comics, Torngarsuk is conflated with elements of Anguta and Tulugaak as Hodiak; chief deity of the northern gods and divine grandfather of Alpha Flight member Snowbird.
