= Tarqiup Inua =

Inuit deity

In Inuit mythology, Tarqiup Inua ("Master of the Moon") or Tatqim Iñua (Iñupiaq) is a lunar deity.

Names include:

- the general word for moon, Tatqeq (Netsilik) and Tarqeq (Iglulik), or Tarqiup inua to specify the spirit
- Aningaa, Aningaaq, or Aningait (Netsilik) and Aningaat (Iglulik) or Aningaap inua again specifying the spirit

The later names are associated with Sun and Moon (Inuit myth).

== Mythology ==
Tarqiup Inua is a god of fertility, the morally righteous and for the Inuit of Alaska - the animals. The spirit of the Moon is a man, a mighty hunter who dwells in the skies.

== See also ==
- Inua
- List of lunar deities
