= Agloolik =

Spirit in Inuit mythology

In Inuit religion, Agloolik (Inuktitut: ᐊᒡᓗᓕᒃ) is a spirit that lives underneath the ice of the Arctic Ocean and acts as tutelary guardian for the protection of seals. It is said to provide aid to fishermen and hunters. If Inuit hunters prayed to the spirit before fishing, Agloolik will bless them with prey.
