= Qailertetang =

Inuit goddess

Qailertetang is an Inuit goddess who cares for animals, fishers, and hunters and who controls the weather. She dwells with her companion Sedna at the bottom of the sea in the company of seals, whales, and other sea creatures. Qailertetang is depicted as a "large woman of very heavy limbs". Before hunts, she, along with Sedna, are served by shamans on behalf of the rest of the tribe in rituals designed to ensure success in said hunts as coastal Inuit groups' diets mostly consist of sea animals.

The word also used to refer to two ritual figures in the Inuit new year holiday, Quviasukvik, the most important Inuit holiday. Two gigantic figures wearing heavy boots, several pairs of breeches, a woman's overjacket, and tattooed sealskin masks and carrying seal spears and scrapers in their hands and an inflated buoy of sealskin on their back, would pair off the men and women and then chase them to the woman's hut "where they are for the following day and night man and wife." After this, the qailertetang go to the shore, invoke the north wind for good weather, and ward off the "unfavorable" south wind. As soon as they finish this, all the men of the village attack them with great noise, pretending to kill them and slashing open the buoys they carry. The men leave to get their drinking cups and the qailertetang "awake to new life." After filling their sealskins with water, each man would pass them a cup of water from it and ask about the future, if the hunt will be successful, and about life events in general. They would answer in murmurs which the inquirer would have to interpret themselves. Inuit scholars Laugrand and Oosten call them the representatives of Sedna.
