= Nanook =

Bear in Inuit religion

In Inuit religion, Nanook (/ˈnænuːk/; Inuktitut: ᓇᓄᖅ [naˈnuq], lit. 'polar bear') was the master of bears, meaning he decided if hunters deserved success in finding and hunting bears and punished violations of taboos. The word was popularized by Nanook of the North, the first feature-length documentary.

The Inuit believed that Nanook, the polar bear, was powerful and mighty, and they thought that he was "almost man." The Inuit hunters would worship this great bear because they believed that he decided if the hunters would be successful. “In the past, the Inuit ate polar bear meat and used the fur to make warm trousers for men and kamiks (soft boots) for women”. Respect was given to Nanook by the hunter hanging the bear's hide in a special section of his igloo, where it would stay for several days. They would also offer the bear's spirit weapons and other hunting tools if it was a male, and needle cases, scrapers (used to scrape the fat off hides) and knives if it was female. “Native people believed that polar bears allowed themselves to be killed in order to obtain the souls of the tools (tatkoit), which they would take with them into the hereafter.” “Legend says that if a dead polar bear was treated properly by the hunter, it would share the good news with other bears so they would be eager to be killed by him. Bears would stay away from hunters who failed to pay respect.”

== See also ==
- Animism
- Bear worship
- List of hunting deities
