= Pinga (goddess) =

Inuit goddess of the hunt and medicine

In the Inuit religion, Pinga ('the one who is [up on] high') is a goddess of the hunt and medicine. She is heavily associated with the sky.

== Caribou Inuit tradition ==
In Caribou Inuit communities, Pinga had some authority over caribou herds. She would become angry if people killed more caribou than they could eat, so Caribou communities were careful not to over-hunt. Pinga was also a psychopomp, receiving the souls of the newly deceased and preparing them for reincarnation. Angakkuit (shamans) might have seen or communicated with Pinga, or sometimes she may have sent a spirit to speak with them.

Some Caribou Inuit viewed Sila and Pinga as the same or similar, while other communities differentiated between the two.
