= Anguta =

Inuit deity

Anguta (also called "His Father," Anigut, or Aguta) is the father of the sea goddess Sedna in the Inuit religion.

== Status ==
In certain myths of the Greenlandic Inuit, Anguta is considered the creator god and is the supreme being among Inuit. In other myths, Anguta is merely a mortal. He is a god of the dead in some myths.

== Name ==
His name, meaning "man with something to cut", refers to his mutilating of his daughter which ultimately resulted in her godhood, an act he carried out in both myths.

== Function ==
Anguta is a psychopomp, ferrying souls from the land of the living to the underworld, called Adlivun, where his daughter rules. Those souls must then sleep near him for a year before they go to Qudlivun ("those above us"), where they will enjoy eternal bliss. In some versions of the myth, only unworthy souls have to stay with Anguta in the land of the dead. In these myths, he pinches the dead to torment them.

== See also ==
- Pinga, another psychopomp in Inuit mythology
