= Suicide in Canada =

According to the latest available data, Statistics Canada estimates 4,157 suicides took place in Canada in 2017, making it the 9th leading cause of death, between Alzheimer's disease (8th) and cirrhosis and other liver diseases (10th). In 2009, there were an estimated 3,890 suicide deaths.

According to Statistics Canada, in the period from 1950 to 2009, males died by suicide at a rate three times that of women. The much higher rate of male suicide is a long-term pattern in Canada. At all points in time over the past 60 years, males have had higher rates of suicide than females.

During 1999–2003, the suicide rate among Nunavut males aged 15 to 19 was estimated to exceed 800 per 100,000 population, compared to around 14 for the general Canadian male population in that age group.

== Suicide rate over time ==
Rates of suicide in Canada have been fairly constant since the 1920s, averaging annually around twenty (males) and five (females) per 100,000 population, ranging from lows of 14 (males, 1944) and 4 (females, 1925, 1963) to peaks of 27 (males, 1977, 1982) and 10 (females, 1973). During the 2000s, Canada ranked 34th-highest overall among 107 nations' suicide rates.

Suicide rates (per 100,000 residents) in Canada, by year
Year	Rate (both sexes)
1950	8.8
1951	7.9
1952	7.7
1953	7.1
1954	7.2
1955	7.0
1956	7.6
1957	7.5
1958	7.4
1959	7.1
1960	7.6
1961	7.5
1962	7.2
1963	7.6
1964	8.2
1965	8.7
1966	8.6
1967	9.0
1968	9.8
1969	10.9
1970	11.3
1971	11.7
1972	12.0
1973	12.2
1974	12.7
1975	12.1
1976	12.5
1977	14.0
1978	13.4
1979	13.9
1980	13.7
1981	13.7
1982	14.0
1983	14.8
1984	13.4
1985	12.6
1986	14.1
1987	13.6
1988	13.1
1989	12.8
1990	12.2
1991	12.8
1992	13.1
1993	13.3
1994	12.9
1995	13.5
1996	12.3
1997	12.3
1998	12.3
1999	13.4
2000	11.8
2001	11.9
2002	11.6
2003	11.9
2004	11.3
2005	11.6
2006	10.8
2007	11.0
2008	11.1
2009	11.5
2010	11.6
2011	11.3
2012	11.3
2013	11.5
2014	12.0
2015	12.3
2016	11.0
2017	11.3

== Demographics and locations ==
Canada's incidence of suicide – deaths caused by intentional self-harm divided by total deaths from all causes – averaged over the period from 2000 to 2007 for both sexes, was highest in the northern territory of Nunavut, and highest across the country within the age group from 45 to 49 years.

=== By region and gender ===
Canadian males experience two periods over their lives when they are most likely to die by suicide—in their late forties, and past the age of ninety—for females there is a single peak, in their early fifties. The peak male rates are 53% above the average for all ages, while for females, the peak is 72% greater.

With 86.5 suicides per 100,000 population in 2006, males' rates over the age of 74 in Russia exceed by threefold Canadian males' rate among the same age cohort. However, Nunavut males of all ages exceeded the elderly Russian male rate by 30%. During 2000–2007, there were between 13 and 25 male suicides recorded annually in the Nunavut territory, accounting for between 16% and 30% of total annual mortality.

In Nunavut, suicide among Inuit is 10 times higher than the Canadian suicide rate. In 2019, Nunavut's suicide rate was reported to be the highest in the world.

Age-standardized suicide rate (per 100 000 population), by province or territory. All ages, average over 2000-2007
	Both sexes	Males	Females
Canada	10.90	17.04	4.96
Alberta	13.13	19.81	6.41
British Columbia	9.73	14.95	4.68
Manitoba	12.04	18.04	6.13
New Brunswick	11.95	19.78	4.38
Newfoundland and Labrador	8.54	14.75	2.54
Northwest Territories	18.66	32.35	4.99
Nova Scotia	9.29	15.58	3.34
Nunavut	71.00	113.69	26.26
Ontario	7.86	12.16	3.80
Prince Edward Island	8.86	14.94	3.01
Quebec	15.20	24.05	6.53
Saskatchewan	11.46	17.83	5.19
Yukon	15.30	26.84	3.91

=== By age group ===
Among Canadians aged 15 to 24, suicide ranked second among the most common causes of death during 2003–2007, accounting for one-fifth of total mortality. In the 45 to 54 age group, its rank was fourth over these years, the cause of 6 per cent of all deaths.

Age-standardized suicide rate (per 100,000 population), according to age at death. All Canadians, average over 2000–2007.
	Both sexes	Males	Females
All ages	11.48	17.81	5.24
1–4	0.00	0.00	0.00
5–10	0.01	0.01	0.00
10–14	1.61	1.71	1.54
15–19	9.53	13.75	5.06
20–24	13.24	20.84	5.26
25–29	12.15	19.26	4.88
30–34	13.09	20.48	5.60
35–39	15.76	24.36	7.00
40–44	16.56	25.49	7.56
45–49	17.86	26.96	8.78
50–54	17.26	25.63	9.03
55–59	14.99	22.98	7.15
60–64	12.31	19.40	5.46
65–69	10.73	16.50	5.33
70–74	10.38	17.54	4.20
75–79	11.33	21.30	3.84
80–84	9.76	19.74	3.55
85–89	10.80	25.74	3.43
90 and over	9.64	27.84	3.21

Suicides in Canada by age (both sexes) from 2007 to 2011
Both sexes				Males				Female			
Age	Population	Suicides	Rate	Age	Population	Suicides	Rate	Age	Population	Suicides	Rate
10 to 14 years	1,920,355	144	1.5	10 to 14 years	983,995	78	1.59	10 to 14 years	936,360	66	1.41
15 to 19 years	2,178,135	991	9.1	15 to 19 years	1,115,845	702	12.58	15 to 19 years	1,062,295	289	5.44
20 to 24 years	2,187,450	1,411	12.9	20 to 24 years	1,108,775	1,085	19.57	20 to 24 years	1,078,670	326	6.04
25 to 29 years	2,169,590	1,328	12.24	25 to 29 years	1,077,275	1,010	18.75	25 to 29 years	1,092,315	318	5.82
30 to 34 years	2,162,905	1,365	12.62	30 to 34 years	1,058,810	1,045	19.74	30 to 34 years	1,104,095	320	5.8
35 to 39 years	2,173,930	1,604	14.76	35 to 39 years	1,064,200	1,230	23.12	35 to 39 years	1,109,735	374	6.74
40 to 44 years	2,324,875	2,005	17.25	40 to 44 years	1,141,720	1,521	26.64	40 to 44 years	1,183,155	484	8.18
45 to 49 years	2,675,130	2,379	17.79	45 to 49 years	1,318,715	1,804	27.36	45 to 49 years	1,356,420	575	8.48
50 to 54 years	2,658,965	2,231	16.78	50 to 54 years	1,309,030	1,657	25.32	50 to 54 years	1,349,940	574	8.5
55 to 59 years	2,340,635	1,776	15.18	55 to 59 years	1,147,300	1,293	22.54	55 to 59 years	1,193,335	483	8.09
60 to 64 years	2,052,670	1,185	11.55	60 to 64 years	1,002,690	868	17.31	60 to 64 years	1,049,985	317	6.04
65 to 69 years	1,521,715	700	9.2	65 to 69 years	738,010	547	14.82	65 to 69 years	783,705	153	3.9
70 to 74 years	1,153,065	583	10.11	70 to 74 years	543,435	473	17.41	70 to 74 years	609,630	110	3.61
75 to 79 years	922,700	489	10.6	75 to 79 years	417,945	398	19.05	75 to 79 years	504,755	91	3.61
80 to 84 years	702,070	368	10.48	80 to 84 years	291,085	303	20.82	80 to 84 years	410,985	65	3.16
85 years and over	645,515	324	10.04	85 years and over	208,300	240	23.04	85 years and over	437,215	84	3.84
Total	33,476,685	18,885	11.28	Total	16,414,225	14,255	17.37	Total	17,062,460	4,630	5.43

=== Military ===
An internal study of suicide rates among Canadian Forces staff deployed over the period 1995 to 2008 found the rate for males in the Regular Forces to be approximately 20% lower than that among the general population of the same age.

However, mortality analysis of 2,800 former Canadian Forces personnel revealed statistically significant, higher likelihoods of death by suicide. The rate of suicide amongst former military personnel was 46% higher for males and 32% higher for females, relative to the civilian population. Released Canadian Forces males in the 16 to 24 age group showed the greatest deviations, with suicide rates more than two-fold in excess of their general population cohort.

== Among Indigenous peoples ==
Suicide rates across First Nations, Inuit, and Metis communities continue to be considerably higher than that of non-Indigenous peoples in Canada. A Statistics Canada survey from 2011 to 2016 found that, when comparing suicide rates of Indigenous peoples to the rest of the Canadian population, First Nations people had a suicide rate three times higher, Metis had an estimated rate two times higher, and Inuit communities were found to face a suicide rate as much as 9 times higher than the national average.

When comparing Indigenous suicide rates by band from 2011 to 2016, the survey found that "over 60% of the First Nations bands had zero suicide rates." It showed 71% to 80% of bands located in British Columbia, Ontario, Yukon and Northwest Territories had a suicide rate of zero; in contrast, bands in the Atlantic provinces and Saskatchewan had a proportion of 55% while bands in the rest of the provinces had proportions between 39% and 44%.

Suicide has been acknowledged by the Royal Commission on Aboriginal Peoples as "one of the most urgent problems facing Aboriginal communities". (Note: "The term Aboriginal People refers to the indigenous inhabitants of Canada when describing in a general manner the Inuit, and First Nations (Indians), and Métis people, without regard to their separate origins and identities.") The report described numerous aspects of the magnitude of the problem.

In a 2002 article published in the Emergency Medicine journal, researchers reported that there was a two- to seven-fold differential in suicide mortality rates among Indigenous peoples in Canada relative to the general population. The rate of suicide among Aboriginal people of Canada exceeded the two- to three-fold elevations reported among Indigenous peoples in other countries of British colonization, including Australia and the United States.

In 2006, Health Canada reported that suicide rates were "five to seven times higher for First Nations youth than for non-Aboriginal youth" and that suicide rates among Inuit youth "were among the highest in the world, at 11 times the national average".

In their 2007 report, the Aboriginal Healing Foundation (AHF) noted that while the suicide rate in Canada overall had declined, for Aboriginal people, particularly Aboriginal youth, the rates had continued to rise. "From the ages of 10 to 29, Aboriginal youth on reserves are 5 to 6 times more likely to die of suicide than their peers in the general population. Over a third of all deaths among Aboriginal youth are attributable to suicide. Although the gender difference is smaller than among the non-Aboriginal population, males are more likely to die by suicide, while females make attempts more often."

In 2013, James Anaya, the UN's special rapporteur on the rights of Indigenous peoples, stated he was deeply concerned by the suicide rate in aboriginal communities. He noted particularly that in Pukatawagan, there has been a suicide every six weeks since January 2013. Since 2009, "there have been as many as 27 more suicides at Pukatawagan, which is home to 2,500 residents." The "suicide rate among youth on reserves is 'alarming' at a rate five times greater than that of all Canadians".

Important books addressing the Indigenous suicide problem in Canada include Dying To Please You: Indigenous Suicide in Contemporary Canada by Roland Chrisjohn and Shaunessy McKay, which was published in 2017; the authors are both academics, and Chrisjohn's earlier work on exposing the violence of residential schools is considered ground-breaking. All Our Relations: Finding the Path Forward, by Tanya Talaga, was published in 2018; Talaga's earlier book on Indigenous youth deaths in Thunder Bay was award-winning, and All Our Relations is the print version of the Massey Lectures she gave in five cities and which were broadcast on CBC Radio.

=== Inuit ===
By 2007, in a population of 30,000 that is mainly Inuit, "40 per cent of deaths investigated by the coroner's office were suicides. Many of the 222 suicide victims were young, Inuit and male."

In 2007, an article by Nunavut social science researcher Jack Hicks entitled "The social determinants of elevated rates of suicide among Inuit youth" was published by the International Working Group of Indigenous Affairs in their journal Indigenous Affairs. Hicks described how the rate of suicide among the Inuit of the eastern Arctic rose from around 40 per 100,000 population in 1984 to about 170 in 2002. Some of the reasons given include adverse childhood experiences involving emotional neglect and abuse, family violence and substance abuse, as well as social inequalities brought on by government intervention. In an interview with CBC, Hicks argued that the "Nunavut government and other public organizations [were] not doing enough to address suicide in the territory".

"If we want to help the mental health of a lot of people who seek help, we have to deal with employment, housing, violence, substance abuse."

— Jack Hicks 2008 CBC

Forced relocations of entire Inuit communities, for example, has been noted as having had "devastating effects on psychological well-being".

In December 2007, Samuel Law published the findings of his study of Nunavut mental-health cases from his psychiatric practice at the Baffin Regional Hospital in Iqaluit, Nunavut, in 2000 in the Canadian Journal of Community Mental Health. He revealed that 22 per cent of the 110 mental-health cases he studied involved suicide risk assessments. The population of Iqaluit in 2006 was 6,184.

Suicide among Inuit was rare in the 1950s. The reports of suicide among the elderly come from anthropologists in the 1950s, whose work may not be reliable.

=== Cultural and historical factors ===
Although data about suicide are limited regarding the pre-contact period in North America, historical and ethnographic records suggest that suicide was rare because most Aboriginal cultures prohibited suicide and in some First Nations—for example, the Athabaskans, the Huron and Iroquois nations— those "who died by suicide were denied ordinary funeral and burial rites". Although many accounts make mention of altruistic suicide by the elderly, incurably ill, injured or disabled in response to periods of starvation or other desperate circumstances, Vogel argued that "its true prevalence is unknown." Despair and grief at the loss of camp and family members to epidemics of smallpox, and other diseases introduced by Europeans, may have provoked suicides among Aboriginal survivors.

In July 2001, a Suicide Prevention Advisory Group (SPAG) was jointly appointed by the Assembly of First Nations' former National Chief, Matthew Coon Come, and former Minister of Health, Allan Rock, to "make recommendations regarding the prevention of suicide among First Nations youth." In their 2002 report, SPAG referred to the contributing factors identified by the Royal Commission on Aboriginal Peoples: psycho-biological factors, life history or situational factors, socio-economic factors, and cultural stress.

In 2017, a study in The Canadian Journal of Psychiatry found intergenerational trauma due to the Canadian Indian residential school system to be linked to mental health issues and suicidal thoughts and actions. "Exposure of one previous familial generation to the Indian Residential School experience was associated with increased risk for lifetime suicide ideation and attempts" and "2 generations of Indian Residential Schools familial history was associated with greater odds of reporting a suicide attempt compared with having one generation."

=== Other factors ===
High concentrations of air pollutants, particularly nitrogen oxide during the winter months, have been associated with a twenty per cent rise in suicidal attempt presentations at a Vancouver hospital emergency department. Pathological gambling behaviour has been linked to a threefold increase in the likelihood of suicide attempts from a nationally representative sample.

The same study found the overall incidence of attempted suicide to be 0.52% in 2002 from a survey of forty thousand individuals, with rates nine times higher among both persons aged 15 to 19 compared to those over age 55, and nine times higher among those who had major depressive episodes during the previous year; persons in the lowest income quintile were four times as likely to report suicide attempts than those in the top income bracket.

Unattached Canadians between 45 and 59 years of age were in 2007 found to be 2.6 times more likely than their population share to fall within the low income category as defined by the low income cutoff measure, making them the most at-risk population group; they were followed by recent immigrants (2.0), lone parents and their children (1.9), and persons with work limitations (1.2).

During the period from 2002 to 2005, residents of health regions of Quebec that were in the lowest socioeconomic decile, as defined by average household income, unemployment rate and education, were statistically found to have 85% (males) and 51% (females) higher incidences of suicide mortality than Quebeckers in regions in the highest socioeconomic decile, and these differences have either persisted or worsened since 1990.

== Government response ==
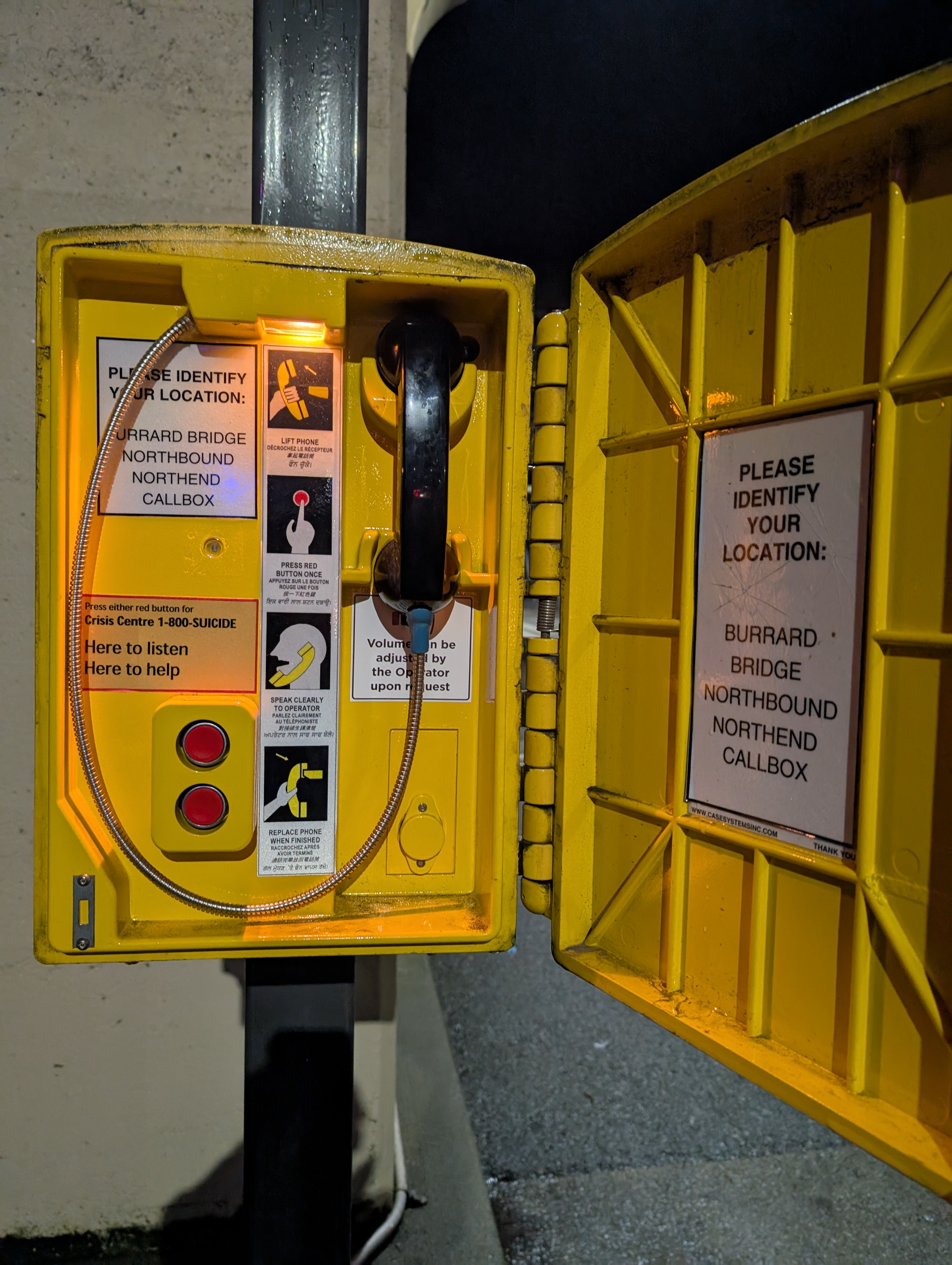
A phonebox at Burrard Bridge routed to the 9-8-8 Suicide Crisis Helpline

A survey of twenty-one advanced, industrialized nations during 2004 found that Canada was among ten lacking "countrywide integrated activities carried out by government bodies" to address the problem of suicide; Canada is in company with Belgium, the Netherlands, and Switzerland, while the eleven countries implementing national programs include Australia, France, the United Kingdom, and the United States.

According to a former president of the Canadian Association for Suicide Prevention, Canada's federal government has failed to implement the 1995 United Nations guidelines for national suicide prevention strategies, the government has never formally acknowledged that "suicide is a national public health issue", and while Quebec, Alberta and Nova Scotia have provincial strategies, both Ontario and Saskatchewan lack them.

During 2005–2010, Canada's federal government allocated a total of $65 million to be administered by Health Canada and the Government of Nunavut for the National Aboriginal Youth Suicide Prevention Strategy (NAYSPS), and by 2010, two hundred community-based programs including mental health service providers, native elders and teachers had benefited from this initiative. The federal government extended the NAYSPS in 2010 for an additional five years, and increased the budget to $75 million.

The National Strategy for Suicide Prevention Act, a private member's bill from New Democratic Party Member of Parliament Megan Leslie, received its first reading in 2010 in Canada's House of Commons. Harold Albrecht (Kitchener—Conestoga, CPC) introduced in September 2011 a private member's bill, known as the Federal Framework for Suicide Prevention Act, which directs the government to take responsibility for information and knowledge sharing related to suicide and suicide prevention in consultation with various government levels and civil society.

In October 2011, a day-long debate in the House of Commons resulted in passage of an opposition motion, by a vote of 272 yeas against 3 nays, to "urge the government to work cooperatively with the provinces, territories, representative organizations from First Nations, Inuit, and Métis people, and other stakeholders to establish and fund a National Suicide Prevention Strategy".

In 2017, a House of Commons Government Response report stated that by 2016 Canada had ensured its "endorsement of the United Nations Declaration on the Rights of Indigenous Peoples, and committed to adopt and implement the Declaration". By June 2016 the Canadian Federal Government had announced its first official budget targeting Indigenous mental and physical well-being. Canada invested "$2.7 billion annually to support First Nations and Inuit health, including over $341 million annually to support First Nations and Inuit mental wellness". As of the 2019 budget, the projections for the 2021-2022 "government investments in Indigenous programs are more than $17 billion", essentially doubling the previous government investments.

These Federal investments have been guided by the recently established "First Nations Mental Wellness Continuum Framework (2015) and the National Inuit Suicide Prevention Strategy (2016)". Both frameworks aim to focus on the social and economic factors regarding mental health in Indigenous communities as these factors are understood as the foundations of the issue.

A 2017 Committee Report by The House of Commons found that a strong joint effort from community leaders, Indigenous organizations, and the Government is still required to further "self determination and self governance" in communities as a suicide prevention strategy. "Community-based approaches" and "cultural continuity" were found to be cornerstones for curbing suicide rates within Indigenous communities.

Since the early 1970s, the policy of the Toronto Transit Commission (TTC) was to suppress information concerning suicide jumpers in the Toronto subway; however, data were publicly released following a request from journalists in 2009. As an interim measure, in June 2011, the TTC implemented a "Crisis Link" campaign, with posters exhorting persons contemplating suicide to press an autodial button on one of 141 designated payphones located on 69 stations' platforms to speak directly with a trained counsellor from the Distress Centres of Toronto.

== Methods ==
During the 1980s and 1990s, firearms (or explosives) and hanging were the first- and second-most frequent means of suicide among Canadian males, followed by poisoning, gases, and jumping, and collectively, nine-tenths of suicides were completed via these five methods; poisoning was responsible for forty per cent of female suicides, followed by hanging (20%), gases and firearms (10% each). Analysis of coroners' reports has attributed overprescription practices, and deficiencies in patient screening and prevention by family physicians to recent Canadian suicide trends.

A study of 20,851 suicides in Quebec from 1990 to 2005 found that hanging, strangulation and suffocation were the principal causes of death (males, age-adjusted rate of 15.6 per 100,000; females, 3.6), followed by poisoning (males: 5.7; females: 2.9).

In 2009, 14 of 18 persons who jumped in front of oncoming subway trains in Toronto's mass transit system were killed by the direct impact, electrocution from the high voltage rail, or from entrapment underneath the cars. Although 1,200 suicide attempts or deaths have occurred in the Toronto subway from 1954 to 2010, with a peak of 54 suicide incidents in 1984, the current rate represents four per cent of Toronto's annual suicides. In 2010, the Toronto Transit Commission reported a total of 26 "suicide incidents" (attempts and deaths), and seven during the first five months of 2011.

== See also ==
- Health in Canada
- Healthcare in Canada
- Law of Canada
