= Inuit religion =

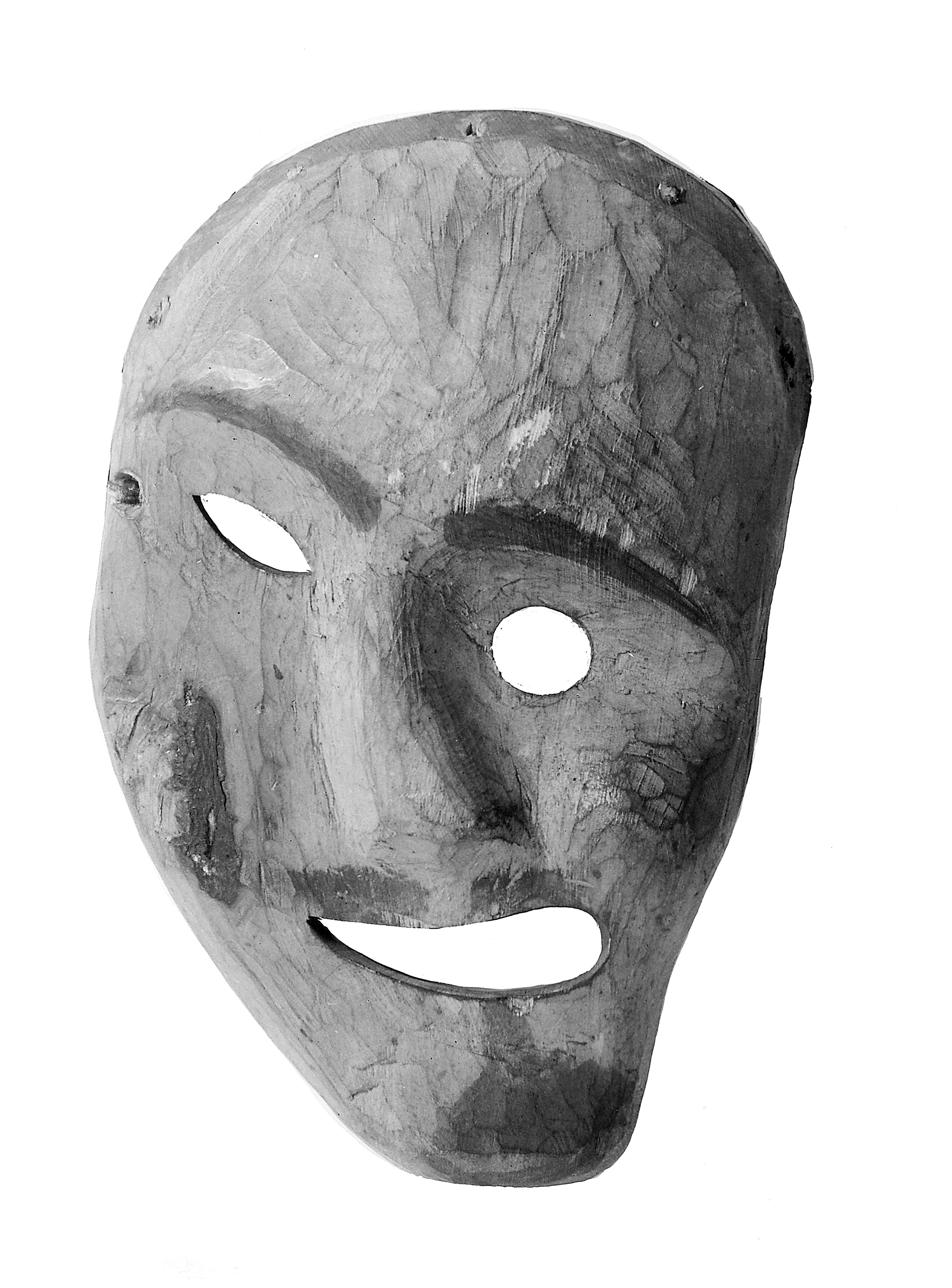
An Inuit mask used by an angakoq, or ritual specialist; part of the Wellcome Collection, London

Inuit religion is the traditional religion of certain circumpolar peoples. It is practised within Inuit (Note: Inuk - singular, Inuit - plural, Inuuk - two people) communities in parts of Chukotka, Alaska, northern Canada, and Greenland. The tradition has no formal leadership or organizational structure and displays much internal variation.

Traditional Inuit theology encompasses a range of deities and spirits inhabiting the Arctic and subarctic landscapes. Humans are regarded as having two souls, one of which can journey out of the body. Historically, an important role was played by ritual specialists known as angakut (sing. angakoq), who mediated between humanity and the spirits. They performed rituals for healing, to recover lost objects, or to assist the hunt. Hunting was traditionally a crucial part of Inuit subsistence, and is informed by various religious taboos. The use of amulets and the observance of various taboos have also been important parts of Inuit tradition.

Inuit were first exposed to Christian Europeans in the 16th century. Over the following centuries, Christian missionaries made efforts to proselytise among Inuit communities, and by the mid-20th century most Inuit had formally converted to Christianity. This process resulted in the substantial decline in the angakut and various other Inuit traditions. From the 1970s, there was a renewed movement to celebrate traditional Inuit culture and encourage Inuit pride.

== Definition and classification ==
Distribution of Inuit, alongside the culturally related Aleuts, across northeast Asia and North America. The map illustrates the various cultural and dialectical divisions among Inuit.

Inuit inhabit a stretch of the Arctic and subarctic region encompassing the northeast tip of Asia and much of northern North America. This includes the Russian province of Chukotka, the American state of Alaska, northern Canada, and the island of Greenland. They often self-identify under a range of regional names, often reflecting their own dialects. The Yupik of Alaska and Russia are sometimes considered culturally distinct from other Inuit, but consider themselves to be Inuit for political purposes. The Inuit are also closely related to the Aleuts of the Aleutian Islands.

The term Inuit means "the human beings". Though there is much debate, the word Eskimo likely derives from a Innu-aimun (Montagnais) exonym meaning 'a person who laces a snowshoe', but is also used in folk etymology as meaning 'eater of raw meat' in the Cree language. Though the Cree etymology has been discredited, "Eskimo" is considered pejorative by some Canadian, English-speaking Greenlandic Inuit and in Alaska.

Inuit religion has been characterized as being highly individualized. It has been informed by the difficult natural conditions in which Inuit live. Historical documentation of these traditions comes largely from Christian missionaries and explorers as well as anthropologists active since the late 19th century.

== Beliefs ==
Jakobsen noted that the Greenlandic Inuit's belief system "derives from a holistic view of the visible and the invisible existing side by side".

=== Theology ===
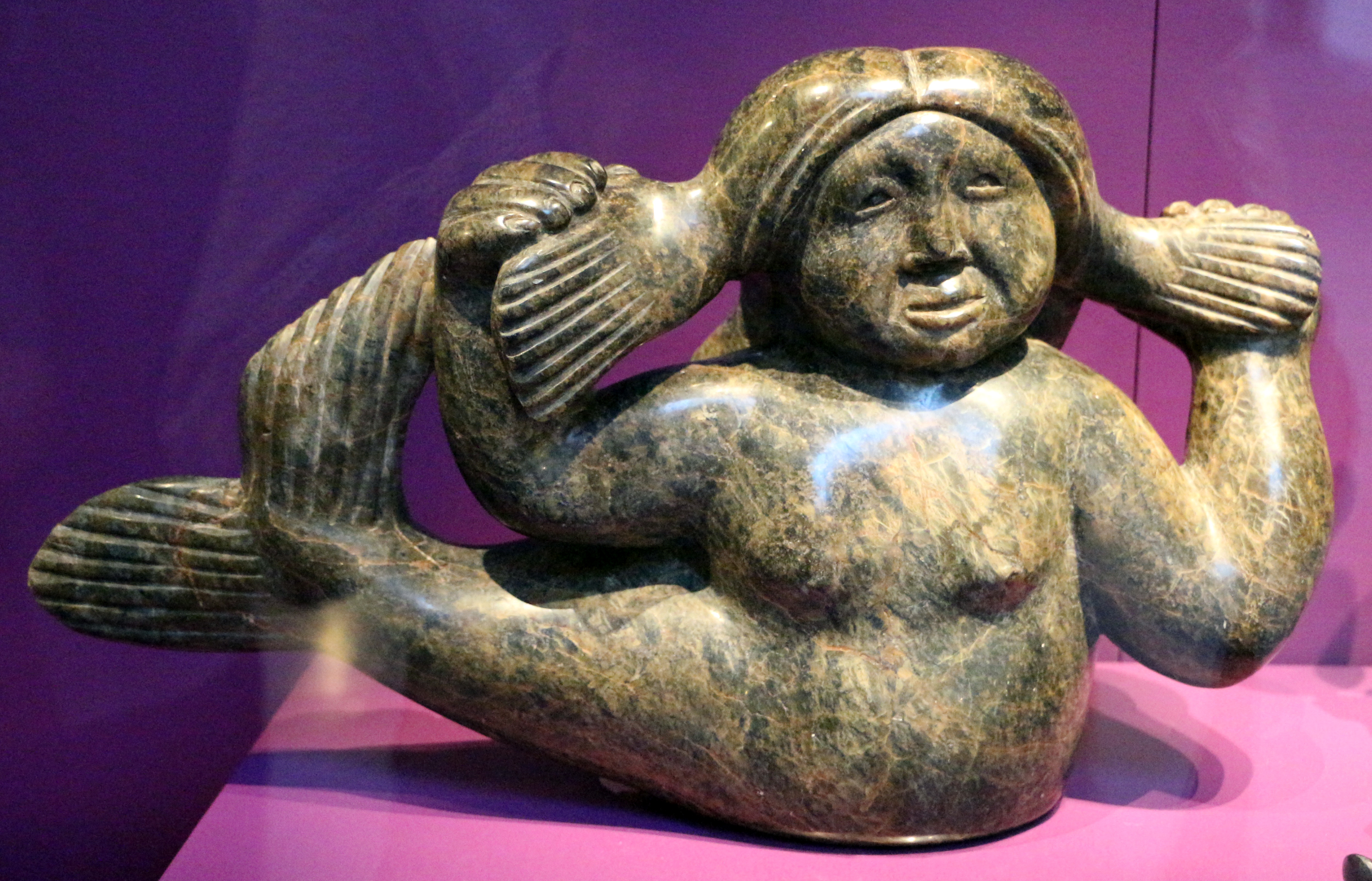
Sedna, an Inuit deity

Among the Copper Inuit, the Sea Mother is called Arnapkapfaaluk or Arnakapshaluk.

The veneration of the sea mother was spread from northern Alaska through to eastern Greenland. Nuliajuk, the Sea Woman, was described as "the lubricious one". If the people breached certain taboos, she held marine mammals in the basin of her qulliq (an oil lamp that burns seal fat). When this happened, the angakkuq had to visit her to beg for game. In Netsilik oral history, she was originally an orphan girl mistreated by her community. Because of their inland lifestyle, the Kivallirmiut (Caribou Inuit) have no belief concerning a Sea Woman. Other cosmic beings, named Silap Inua (Sila) or Pinga, control the caribou, as opposed to marine mammals. Some groups have made a distinction between the two figures, while others have considered them the same. Sacrificial offerings to them could promote luck in hunting.

Moon Man, another cosmic being, is benevolent towards humans and their souls as they arrived in celestial places. This belief differs from that of the Greenlandic Inuit, in which the Moon's wrath could be invoked by breaking taboos.

Sila or Silap Inua, often associated with weather, is conceived of as a power contained within people. Among the Netsilik, Sila was imagined as a male. The Netsilik (and Copper Inuit) believed Sila was originally a giant baby whose parents died fighting giants.

Below is an incomplete list of Inuit deities believed to hold power over some specific part of the Inuit world:

- Agloolik: evil god of the sea who can flip boats over; spirit which lives under the ice and helps wanderers in hunting and fishing
- Akna: mother goddess of fertility
- Amaguq / Amarok: wolf god who takes those foolish enough to hunt alone at night
- Anguta: gatherer of the dead; he carries them into the underworld, where they must sleep for a year.
- Ignirtoq: a goddess of light and truth.
- Nanook: (Nanuq or Nanuk in the modern spelling) the master of polar bears
- Pinga: the goddess of strength, the hunt, fertility and medicine
- Qailertetang: weather spirit, guardian of animals, and matron of fishers and hunters. Qailertetang is the companion of Sedna.
- Aipaloovik, an evil sea god associated with death and destruction
- Sedna: the mistress of sea animals and mother of the sea. Sedna (Sanna in modern Inuktitut spelling) is known under many names, including Nerrivik, Arnapkapfaaluk, Arnakuagsak, and Nuliajuk.
- Silap Inua or Sila: personification of the air
- Tekkeitsertok: the master of caribou.
- Tarqiup Inua: lunar deity
- Pukkeenegak: Goddess of domestic life, including sewing and cooking.

The term silap inua / sila, hillap inua / hilla (among Inuit), ellam yua / ella (among Yup'ik) has been used with some diversity among the groups. In many instances it refers to "outer space", "intellect", "weather", "sky", "universe": there may be some correspondence with the pre-Socratic concept of logos. In some other groups, this concept was more personified ([sɬam juɣwa] among Siberian Yupik). Among Copper Inuit, this "Wind Indweller" concept is related to spiritual practice: angakkuit were believed to obtain their power from this indweller, moreover, even their helping spirits were termed as silap inue.

Inuit religion holds that human illness can be caused by offending the spirits. Fear of retribution from spirits results in caution so as to avoid offending them. To help prevent causing offence, Inuit have observed various rules and taboos, have offered prayers and songs, worn amulets, and consulted their angakut specialists. Scarcity of game animals is for instance often attributed to breaches in traditional observances and can be remedied through reconciliation with the animals or their indwellers.

Knud Rasmussen asked his guide and friend Aua, an angakkuq (spiritual healer), about Inuit religious beliefs among the Iglulingmiut ('people of Igloolik') and summarized Aua's response as: "We don't believe. We fear." Authors Inge Kleivan and Birgitte Sonne debate possible conclusions of Aua's words, because the angakkuq was under the influence of Christian missionaries, and later converted to Christianity. Their study also analyses beliefs of several Inuit groups, concluding (among others) that fear was not diffuse.

==== Other-than-human persons ====
Inuit beliefs also involve a range of other beings whose existence is not accepted by modern scientific investigation. The anthropologist Erica Hill suggested that these entities could be described as "other-than-human persons", a term originally devised by anthropologist Alfred Irving Hallowell. A belief in similar entities can be found across the Inuit world, from the Yupik in the west to Kalaallit of Greenland in the east.

Among the Yupik, dangerous water-based entities included the human-shaped kogat which dwell in lakes and the palraiyuk which live in swamps. Posing threats on land is the tisikh-puk, a large worm with a human head, while the qununit have seal bodies and human faces, with holes in their hands or shoulders. In many cases, Yupik people have identified specific areas of the landscape where they believe such non-human entities live.

- Ahkiyyini: a skeleton spirit
- Aningaat: a boy who became the moon; brother to Siqiniq, the sun; sometimes equated to the lunar deity Tarqiup Inua
- Aumanil: a spirit which dwelt on the land and guided the seasonal movement of whales
- Qallupilluit: monstrous human-like creatures that live in the sea and carry off disobedient children.
- Saumen Kar: also called Tornit or Tuniit are Inuit versions of the Sasquatch or Yeti myth. They may be the people of the Dorset culture who were said to be giants.
- Siqiniq: a girl who became the sun; sister to Aningaat, the moon
- Tizheruk: snake-like monsters.

=== Mythology and cosmology ===
Inuit cosmology provides a narrative about the world and the place of people within it. Rachel Qitsualik-Tinsley writes:

The Inuit cosmos is ruled by no one. There are no divine mother and father figures. There are no wind gods and solar creators. There are no eternal punishments in the hereafter, as there are no punishments for children or adults in the here and now.

Some people starring in unipkaaqtuat ("traditional stories") or unikkaaqtuat ("to tell stories") include:

- Kiviuq: a wandering hero.
- Uumarnituq and Aakulujjuusi: the first Inuuk, who created childbirth, womanhood, and death.

=== Souls and Anirniit ===
Humans were a complex of three main parts: two souls (iñuusiq and iḷitqusiq: perhaps "life force" and "personal spirit") and a name soul (atiq). After death, the iñuusiq departed for the east, but the other soul components could be reborn.

— Lowenstein

In Inuit traditional belief, a human has two souls, one of which can leave the body at night. Among various Inuit groups, the free soul is referred to as a shadow. In many Inuit communities, when flying the free soul could be visible as fire; Merkur suggested that the widespread distribution of this belief suggests it was once a pan-Inuit notion. Inuit on St. Lawrence Island and in northern Alaska for instance traditionally believed that the soul wandered during sleep, while among the Inuvialuit (Mackenzie Inuit) of the Mackenzie River was recorded the idea that the human eyes journey during sleep. The prolonged absence of the free-soul can result in bodily death.

The Caribou have a dualistic concept of the soul. The soul associated with respiration is called umaffia (place of life) and the personal soul of a child is called tarneq (corresponding to the nappan of the Copper Inuit). The tarneq is considered so weak that it needs the guardianship of a name-soul of a dead relative. The presence of the ancestor in the body of the child was felt to contribute to a more gentle behaviour, especially among boys. This belief amounted to a form of reincarnation.

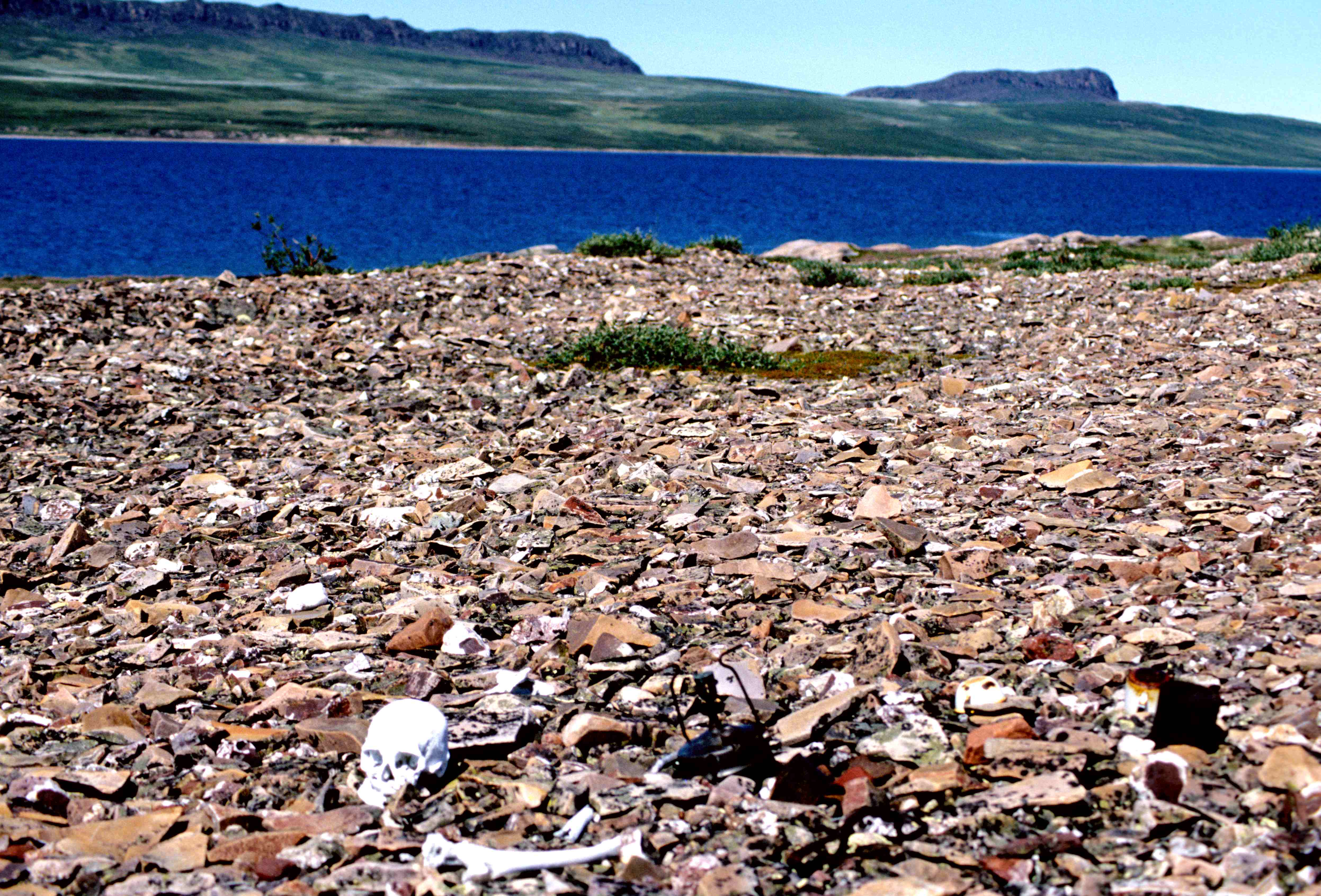
Human remains on a beach near Bathurst Inlet

Dreams are generally deemed to have religious significance; for instance, they sometimes have a prophetic quality. According to ethnographic accounts from the Inughuit (Polar Inuit of northern Greenland) and Labrador Inuit (Nunatsiavut), a recurring belief was that ghosts and spirits may visit a person through their dreams.

Inuit religion maintains that a free soul travels to the afterlife after bodily death; however, if death taboos are not observed, then their free soul may become a ghost and remain in the vicinity of the living. Ghosts were often thought to take the form of fire, sometimes perceived as a ball of fire.

=== Tuurngait ===
Some spirits have never been connected to physical bodies. These are called tuurngait (also tornait, tornat, tornrait, singular tuurngaq, torngak, tornrak, tarngek) and "are often described as a shaman's helping spirits, whose nature depends on the respective angakkuq". Helpful spirits can be called upon in times of need and "are there to help people", as explained by Inuit elder Victor Tungilik.

=== Animal relations ===
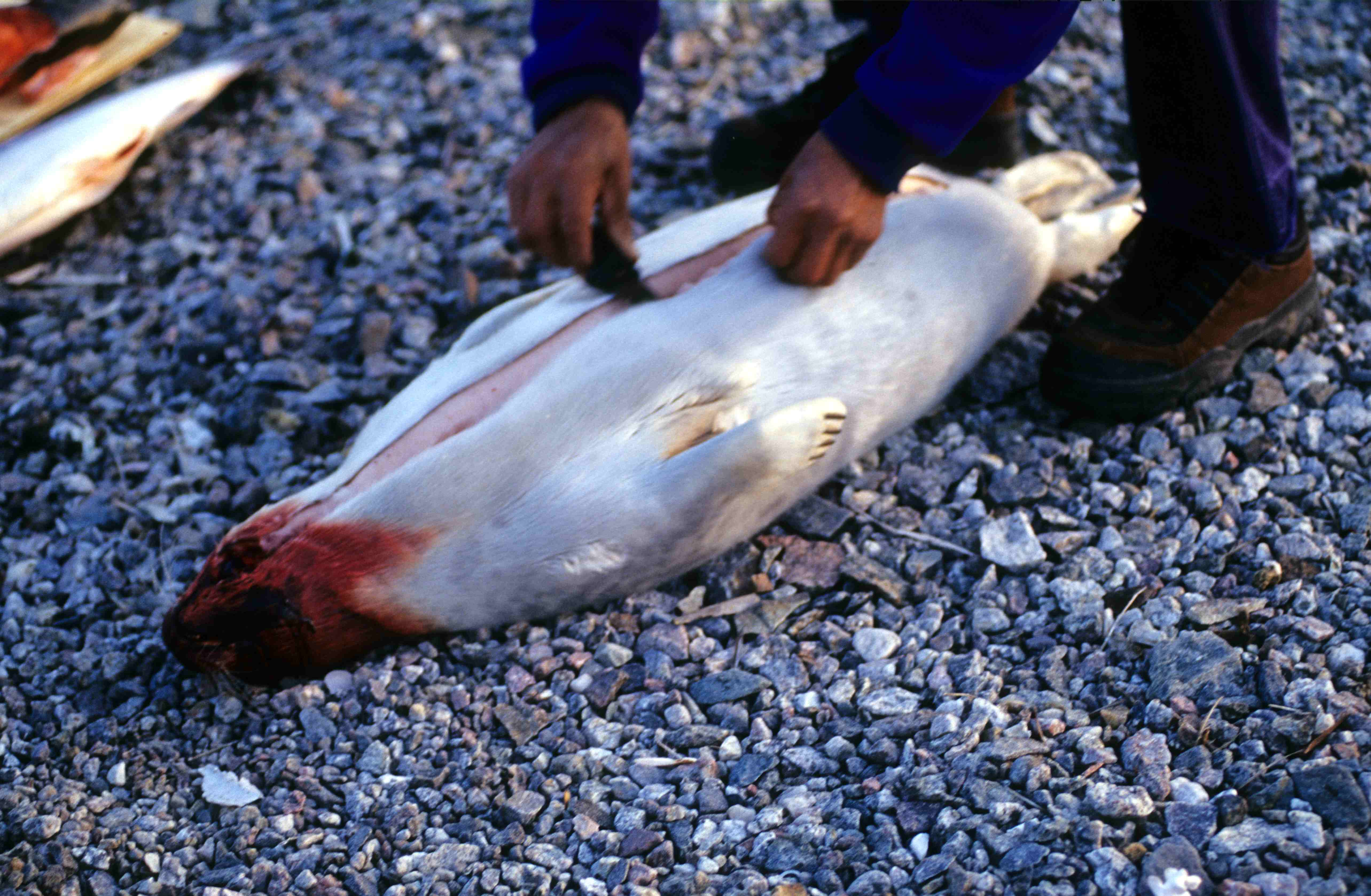
A modern Inuit hunter dressing a ringed seal that has been killed; in Inuit culture, killing animals for food poses risks

Inuit traditional beliefs maintain that humans are interconnected with the broader natural world. This view impacts Inuit relations, especially with animals who provide them with food and garments. Hunters must propitiate their prey, ingratiating themselves with them and warding off their vengeance. The Iglulik (Iglulingmiut or people of the Igloolik area) angakoq Aua told the ethnographer Knud Rasmussen that "The greatest peril of life lies in the fact that human food consists entirely of souls."

Across the various Inuit groups, it is considered important to treat the flesh and bones of killed animals in prescribed ways so as to remain good relations with their species. Archaeologists have excavated caches of seal bones in Nelson and Nunivak Islands which probably reflect these attitudes.

=== Taboos ===
Inuit at Amitsoq Lake on King William Island had seasonal and other prohibitions for sewing certain items. Boot soles, for example, could only be sewn far away from settlements in designated places. Children at Amitsoq once had a game called tunangusartut in which they imitated the adults' behaviour towards the spirits, even reciting the same verbal formulae as angakkuit. According to Rasmussen, this game was not considered offensive because a "spirit can understand the joke."

Kakiniit (traditional tattoos) among Netsilik women provided power and could affect which world they went to after their deaths.

== Practice ==
=== Angakut ===
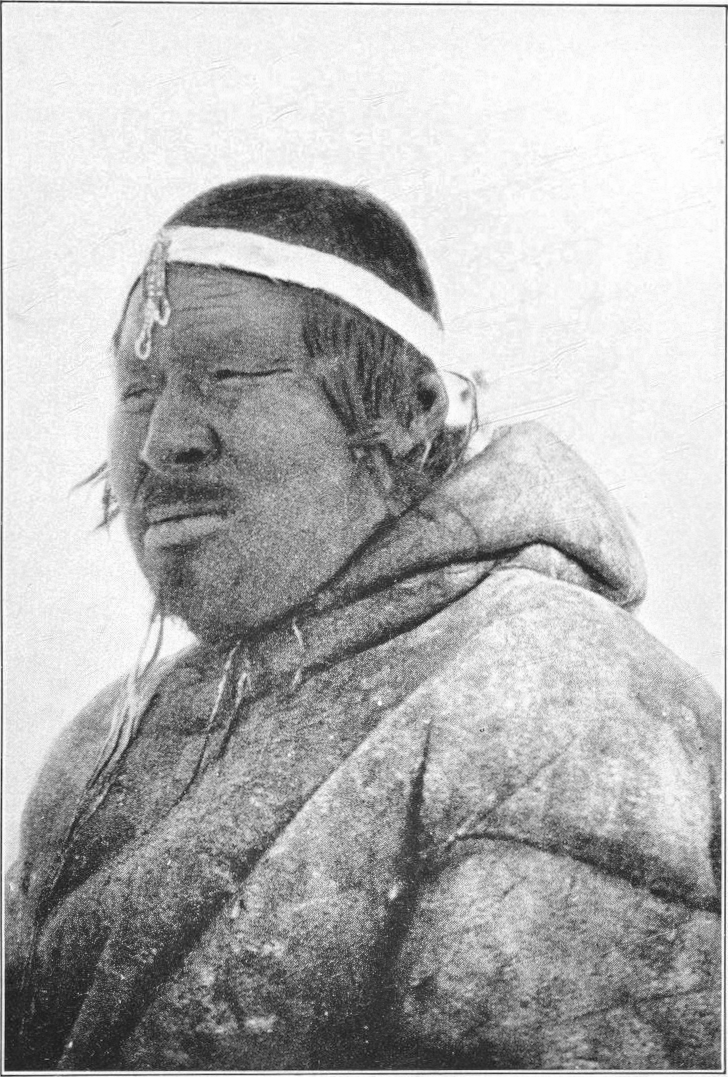
Niaqunguaq, an angakkuq photographed between 1921 and 1924

The main ritual specialist in Inuit religion is termed the angakoq (plural angakut). (Note: Inuktitut syllabics ᐊᖓᑦᑯᖅ or ᐊᖓᒃᑯᖅ) These terms exist in slightly different forms across the various Inuit dialects, although their etymology is unclear. Certain regions also had other terms for these specialists, usually those which highlighted the importance of the helping spirit. of the angakoq The Chugach for instance used the term kalalik, meaning a "possessor of a kalaq or kalagaq" helping spirit. Various Bering Sea Inuit referred to the tunghak, tunghalik, or tunralik, meaning "one who is furnished with a helping spirit".

Europeans devised their own terms for the angakoq. In Danish, which became dominant in Greenland, the angakoq was called an åndemaner (spirit-invoker). Various English-language sources refer to them as "shamans"; introduced to English from the Tungusic languages at the end of the 17th century, the term "shamanism" has never received a commonly agreed definition and has been used in at least four distinct ways. An alternative English-language term is "medicine men", although has attracted criticism.

Both men and women have become angakut, although most have been male. On Alaska's St. Lawrence Island Inuit communities were recorded as maintaining that "transvestite homosexuals" made the best angakuq. Transvestite angakuq have not been historically documented among other Inuit communities, however Merkur noted that legends of both male and female homosexual angakut across central and eastern Inuit groups suggests that "ritual transvestitism" was once widespread. In recorded history, the angakut were typically married, and throughout many Inuit societies, male angakut had the prerogative of demanding sex with other men's wives.

The angakut were historically important for their community's social life, its health, and its prosperity. Accordingly, Jakobsen noted that they could exert "a huge influence on their society". Reflecting an ambiguous relationship, Inuit typically respected angakut, but also feared them; these specialists were deemed capable of using their spirits to harm as well as to heal, and efforts to help one family might bring misfortune to another. The angakut were also often attributed with the ability to steal all or part of a person's soul.

==== Angakut spirits, powers, and tasks ====
Angakut possess helper spirits, entities often residing in dolls or figurines that the angakut create for that purpose. It was the command of these spirits that distinguished angakut from other individuals in Inuit society. A trained angakoq was expected to control their spirits, often using certain words, spells, or songs known only to the angakut. In eastern Greenland, these serving spirits were called tartoks. In this region, various spirit types were recorded. These included the tarajuatsiaks, shadow forms with pointed bald heads that could make the wind blow or steal and/or retrieve souls; the timerseks, who live inland and were also useful in stealing souls; and the inersuaks, spirits of the sea who could assist in attracting marine animals to the shore. Historical records also indicate that many angakut had an amortok as a helper spirit; this was a being with black arms that could bring news and answer questions. It was dangerous and those who touched it were reputed to turn black and die.

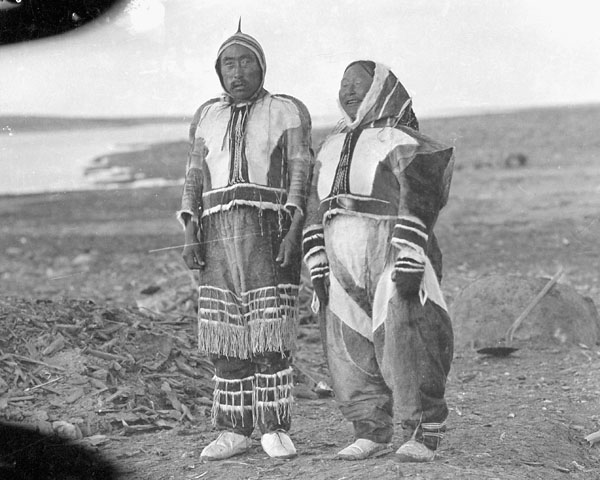
Higalik (right), an angakkuq, and her husband Ikpukhuak (left)

Inuit lore traditionally attributed special powers to the angakut, including an ability to fly, and to display silanigtalersarput, an enhanced vision allowing them to see in the darkness and through clothing and flesh. Their ability to withstand physical dangers, such as harmful spirits, was also taken as evidence of their power.

The angakut central function was healing. At other times, they were tasked with curing female infertility, locating lost objects, or attracting game animals. Elsewhere, they were asked to predict future events like the weather or the outcome of a hunt, or to determine if a traveller faced problems on a road ahead, and if so, to remove those obstacles. In payment for their efforts, angakut were traditionally given meat or other goods, things which would supplement a primary income from their existing livelihood.

==== Angakut séances ====
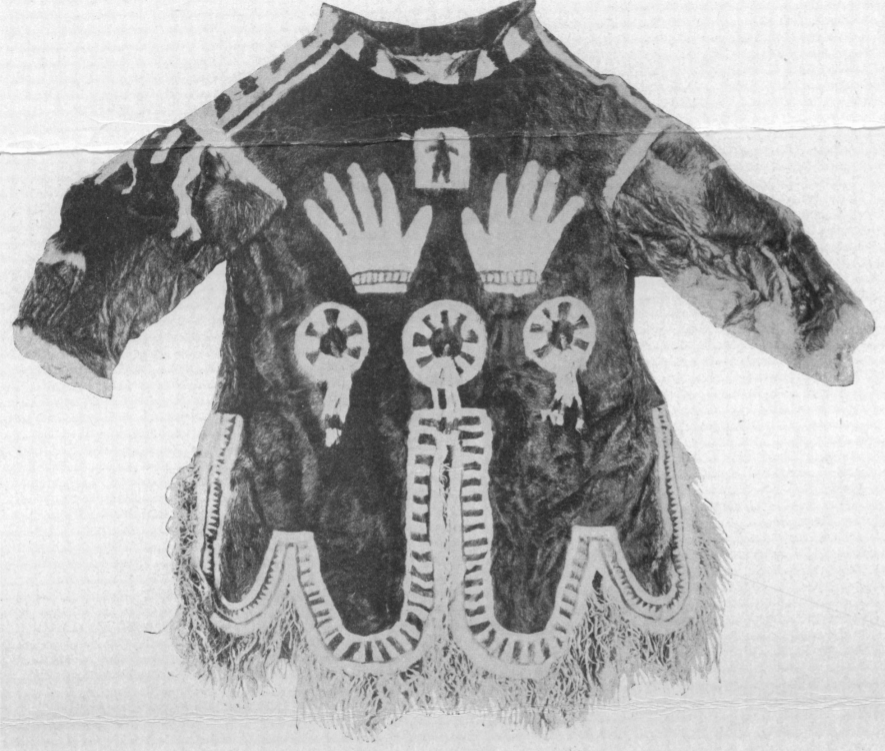
The coat of Aua, an angakkuq from the Igloolik area

The particular practices of angakut could be highly individualized, with Merkur noting that no two séances were "ever quite the same". Patients will often approach the angakoq, who will then seek to determine the cause of their illness using divination. The most common divinatory method employed is qilaneq ('head-lifting'). Most illnesses will subsequently be diagnosed as soul-loss caused by spirits, indwellers of nature, or witchcraft. The angakoq will commonly respond with a séance in which they send their helping spirit out to find the lost soul, or, if the angakoq is more experienced, to go on their own "spirit journey" to retrieve it.

An angakoq will often verbally ask their helping spirit a question, for instance the cause of a patient's illness, and then receive a visual image in their mind that provides them with an answer. In many cases, an angakoq will attribute a patient's illness to their breach of a taboo that has offended the spirits; often, given the small, close-knit nature of Inuit communities, the angakoq will already have been aware of any broken taboos due to community gossip.

Angakut often made, or directed the manufacture, of their ritual paraphernalia. During rituals, they have often been naked or naked above the waist; alternatively they may wear a gutskin raincoat. If undertaking a spirit-journey, a common practice among many angakut was to cover their face.

Angakut rites typically involved inducing a trance state as part of a séance engaging with the spirits. These have most commonly taken place at night, inside huts with the lights turned out, but sometimes have occurred outdoors during daylight hours. Merkur termed these techniques a "platform séance". In many cases, the angakoq secreted themselves on a sleeping platform at the back of their hut, behind a curtain of skins, to perform their ceremony. The arrival of spirits at the séance may be signalled by sounds of growling and scraping. Some angakut produced noises during the séance, which other attendees would then interpret.

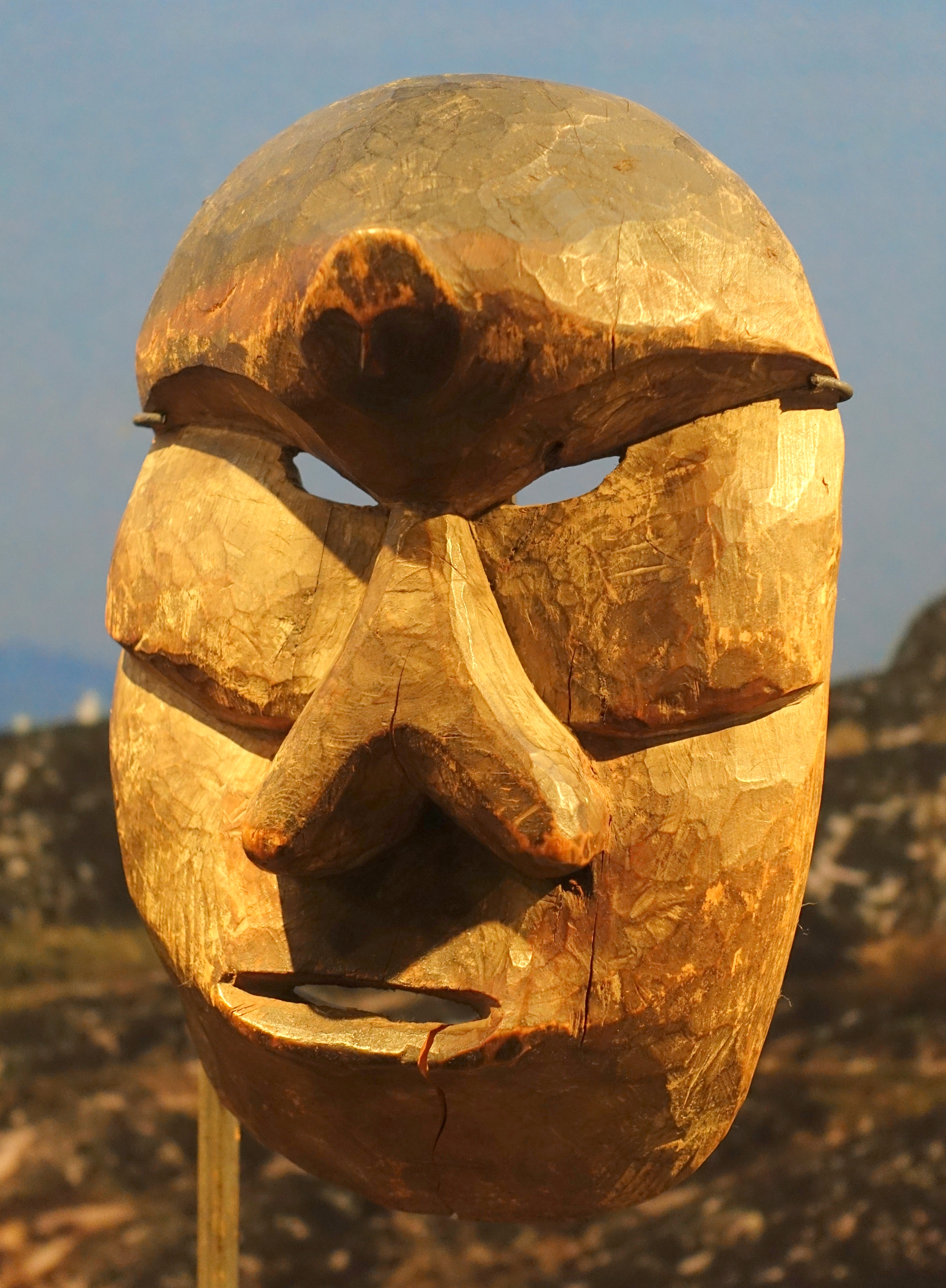
An aŋatkuq mask from the Bering Strait, on display at the Museum of Ethnography, Sweden

There are also accounts of angakut performing the shaking tent rite found among many North American Native communities. Inuit variants of this ritual often feature the angakoq being bound hand and foot, or sometimes with their neck to their knees, using cords. Sometimes, at the end of the rite, they are found to still be bound in the same manner, or alternatively to be free of all bondage. In east Greenland, those angakoq who performed these bound séances were called qimarraterssortugssat, and among them it was often considered the greatest of the angakoq feats.

Inuit observers often recognized that angakut employed ventriloquism and sleights of hand during their séances and other rites, but believe that there remains spiritual importance to this. These sleights of hand were sometimes aided by assistants. To demonstrate that they have been in combat with spirits, the angakoq sometimes presented their torn clothes, or evidence that their hands or weapons had been reddened with blood, to the audience. They might also present apparent wounds indicating that they have been stabbed, with these wounds evidently healing without trace.

==== Angakut spirit journeys ====
The ability to journey to other realms in spirit form was deemed an exceptional feat and only angakut of considerable ability are thought capable of achieving it. When the angakoq travels to the spirit world, the audience around them may sing to encourage them on their way. In various cases, Inuit belief maintained that there were dangers facing the travelling angakoq. West Greenlandic legends outlined how these soul-travellers were repeatedly almost captured by the dangerous spirit Amarsiniook.

For instance, angakut may respond to bad weather by spirit-journeying, or sending their helper spirit, to the indweller of the winds, blizzard, or rain; there are accounts of angakut travelling to Narsuk to stop the storms. Sometimes, angakut have also pursued spirit-journeys for their own curiosity, for instance to visit the Moon Man or the abode of the dead.

==== Becoming an angakoq ====
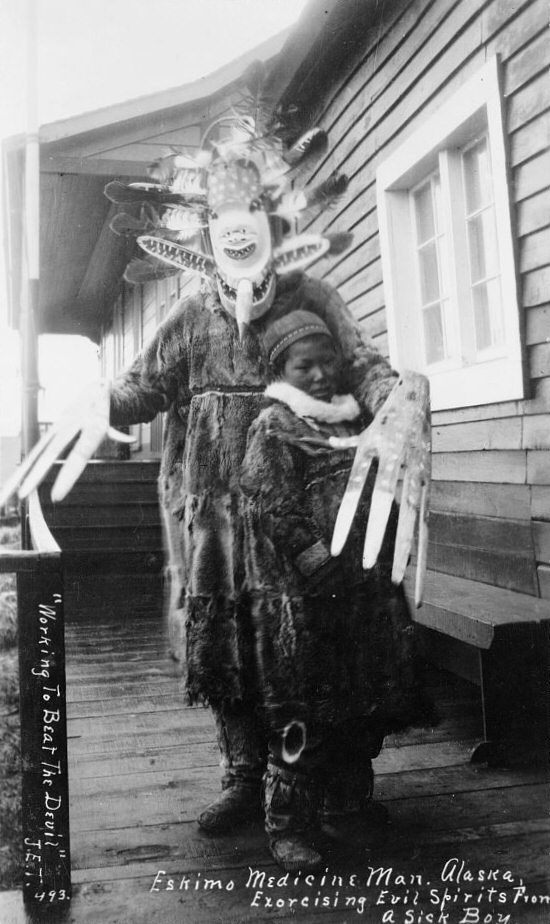
A Yup'ik aŋatkuq, dressed in ritual mask, at Nushagak, Alaska, c.1890

Becoming an angakoq typically required an innate aptitude, one which was deemed to often be reflected in a dream. Inuit rarely hold to the idea of sick people subsequently becoming angakut – in this they differ from Siberian ethnic groups, who often believed that ill individuals became ritual specialists. There are various accounts of people becoming an angakoq on their own initiative, for instance as a response to some frustration or humiliation. Although there are no records of ethnographers observing an angakoq initiation, various accounts of such a process have been provided by angakoq and other Inuit. Initiation to become an angakoq is a secretive process, about which comparatively little is known by outsiders.

An aspiring angakoq was usually expected to train with an existing practitioner. Children would typically be taken on as apprentices, although sometimes adults were too. In northeast Asia and Alaska, angakut often selected their own child, grandchild, or nephew as an apprentice. More broadly, and especially in eastern Greenland, it was common for angakut to choose an orphan. If the apprentice was not a close relation of their teacher, it was common for the former to make a payment of furs or other goods. The new apprentice was often prohibited from telling others about their training, was expected to adopt a specific diet, and was made to follow certain taboos.

The length of an apprenticeship varied. In Greenland, it often took around ten years, while among the Kivallirmiut this instruction could be accompanied over a single winter. Among various Inuit groups, the apprentice had to acquire a metaphorical "inner light". Unlike other communities, the Iglulik explicitly linked this acquisition of the inner light to the Moon Man. The inner light was obtained before acquiring any helper spirits. During their training, an apprentice was expected to learn special terminologies to communicate with the spirits. To become skilled, a trainee was expected to then gather as many tartoks as possible. In the early stages of training, an angakoq exposes themselves to spirit possession with no control over the spirits. A recurring notion in these initiatory experiences was an encounter with a bear spirit, something that challenged the apprentice's strength and their ability to endure hardship. If an angakoq, having completed their apprenticeship, failed to alert their community of their new status then it was sometimes believed that they would become an ilisiitsoq.

Initiation required going to remote areas to seek out a spirit encounter. In a case from eastern Greenland recorded in the late 19th century, an apprentice travelled to a cleft or cave to rub a stone upon another stone in the direction of the sun for three days, at which point their first spirit was believed to appear. Another account, recorded by Rasmussen, involved an apprentice going to a lonely place and calling out for three days, each time hearing his echo. At the end of that period, another voice was reputed to be heard, which would be that of the apprentice's helping spirit.

=== Divination ===
A widely used divinatory practice among Inuit is qilaneq. This involves a sick person lying prone, with their face up; beneath their head will be fastened either the diviner's waistbelt or a line attached to a ceremonial stick. The diviner will then seek to move the patient's head up and down through the affixed fabric, asking questions while doing so. When the head is deemed to become heavy, particularly so heavy that it cannot be moved, then that is interpreted as an affirmative answer to a question. It is believed that the disease-causing spirit is the entity ultimately answering the questions the diviner is putting to it. Qilaneq may practised by angakut but also by other individuals, for unlike the practices of an angakoq it does not require the involvement of a helping spirit. These sorts of divination using weight oracles is also found among various Siberian societies and the Sámi people.

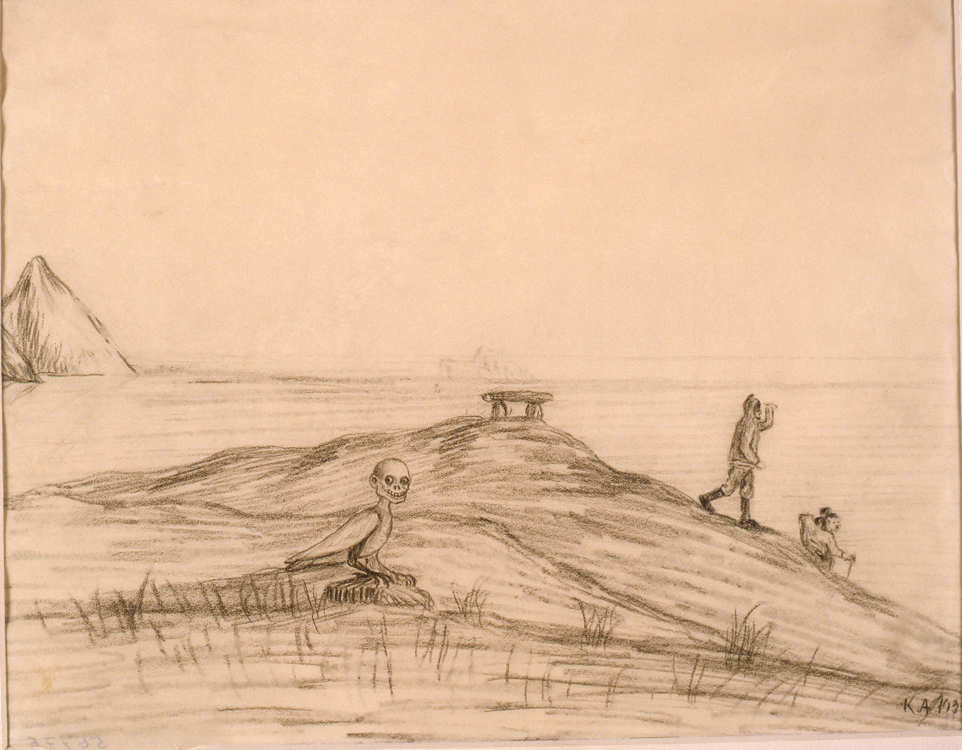
An illustration of a tupilaq from 1934

Inuit society also contains various individuals deemed clairvoyant, and thus capable of seeing spirits, but these differ from angakut in not engaging in séances. They may nevertheless offer services for diagnosing illnesses, finding lost property, and prophesying. Among the Netsilik, for example, an individual called an angarkungaruk does not perform séances but is thought capable of seeing a disease-causing spirit and thus diagnosing a person's illness. The nerfalassok is a type of clairvoyant responsible for locating missing objects and diagnosing illness among Inuit of western Greenland.

=== Feasts and celebrations ===
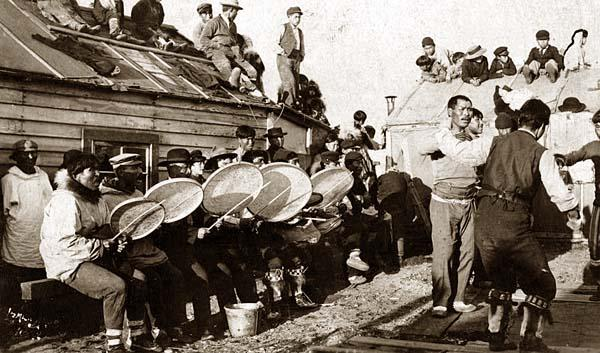
Iñupiat dance near Nome, Alaska, 1900

In Alaska, the influence of neighboring indigenous communities has resulted in the extensive development of Inuit festivals. Angakut have often been involved in feasts connected with the start and end of the hunting season. The Yupik bladder festival involves a feast to which is brought the bladders of seals, walruses, and caribou killed that year. After the feast, the bladders are placed back into the sea to ensure that these species will offer themselves up as prey for the following year.

=== Amulets ===
Inuit have historically often employed amulets, the efficacy of which is attributed to its corresponding spirit. Amulets may be constructed by angakuq but also by lay Inuit too.

Unlike the Iglulik Inuit, the Netsilik used a large number of amulets. Even dogs could have amulets. In one recorded instance, a young boy had 80 amulets, so many that he could hardly play. One particular man had 17 names taken from his ancestors and intended to protect him.

=== Cursing ===
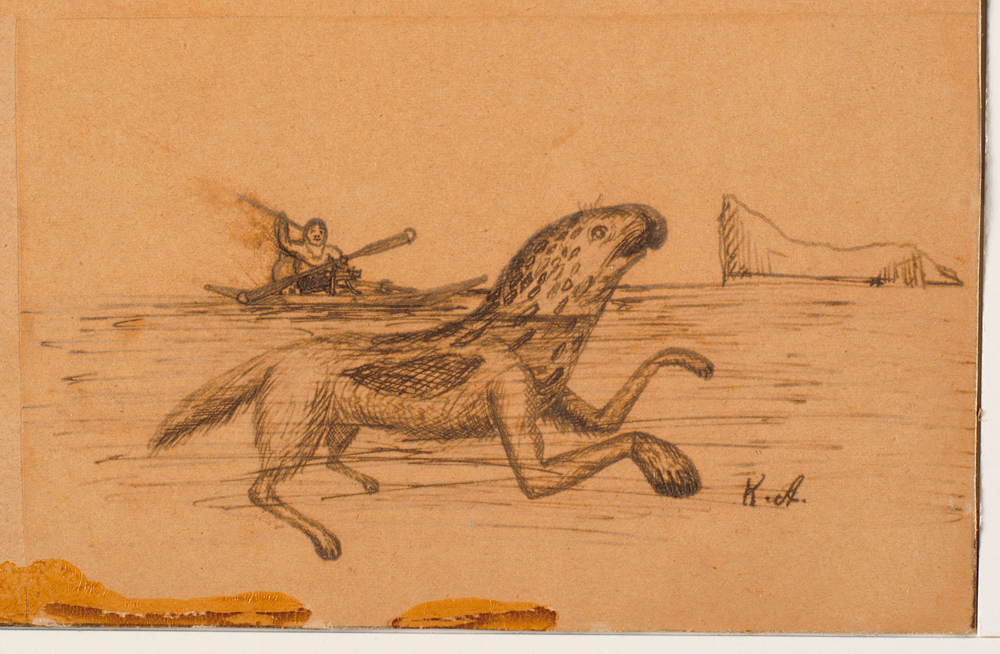
A drawing of a tupilaq, produced between 1920 and 1934

An angakoq might create an entity called a tupilaq that had the function of killing a person. To create this, an angakoq would craft an object using hair, grass, or moss, before ritually bringing it to life. Merkur described these beings as "witchcraft automatons". In Inuit belief, an angakoq was often thought capable of determining if a person was a witch. Due to a belief that witches were bloodless, accused witches might be stabbed to see if they bleed from the wound. If executed, the body of the witch would be carried onto a mountain and cut to pieces.

== History ==
=== European contact ===
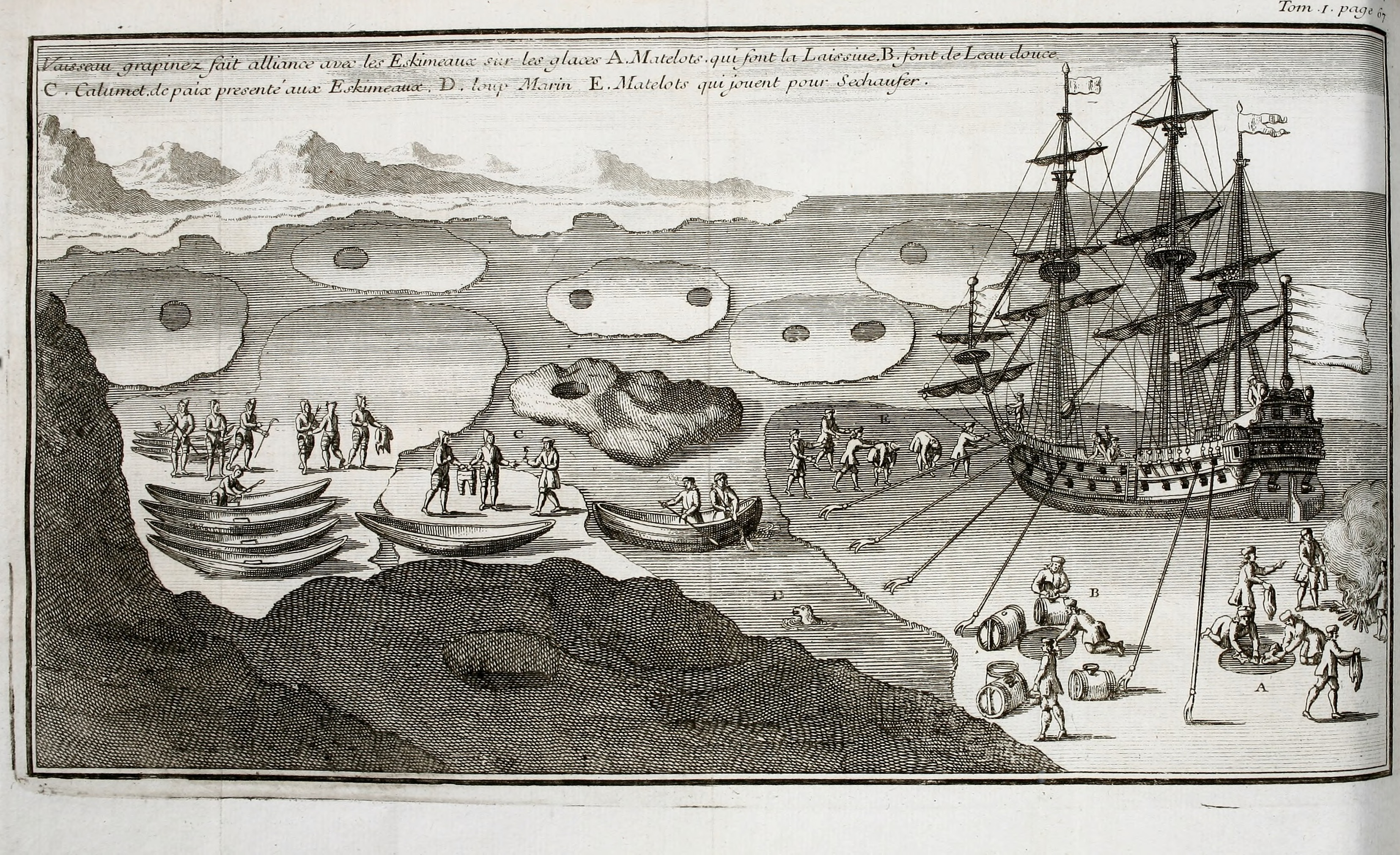
A European ship coming into contact with Inuit on the ice of Hudson Bay in 1697

European ships first began encountering Inuit in what became northeast Canada in the 16th century. When Christianity was introduced to Inuit, they often displayed what Jakobsen called "an openness" to incorporating Christian elements into their "existing spirit world".

In Greenland, angakut continued to practice, sometimes secretly, following Christianity's introduction. In 1746, the Danish King Christian VI wrote a formal letter to Greenlanders complaining about the continued activities of the angakut.

The 19th century saw substantial population decline among Inuit of continental North America, largely due to the introduction of new diseases. Increasingly, Inuit were employed by whalers, economic changes that contributed to cultural change. Ethnographic accounts from the period highlight the decline in many traditional Inuit customs, such as the tattooing of women. Europeans generally perceived the demise of Inuit culture to be inevitable, with white ethnographers like Franz Boas and Knud Rasmussen hoping to document Inuit culture before it disappeared.

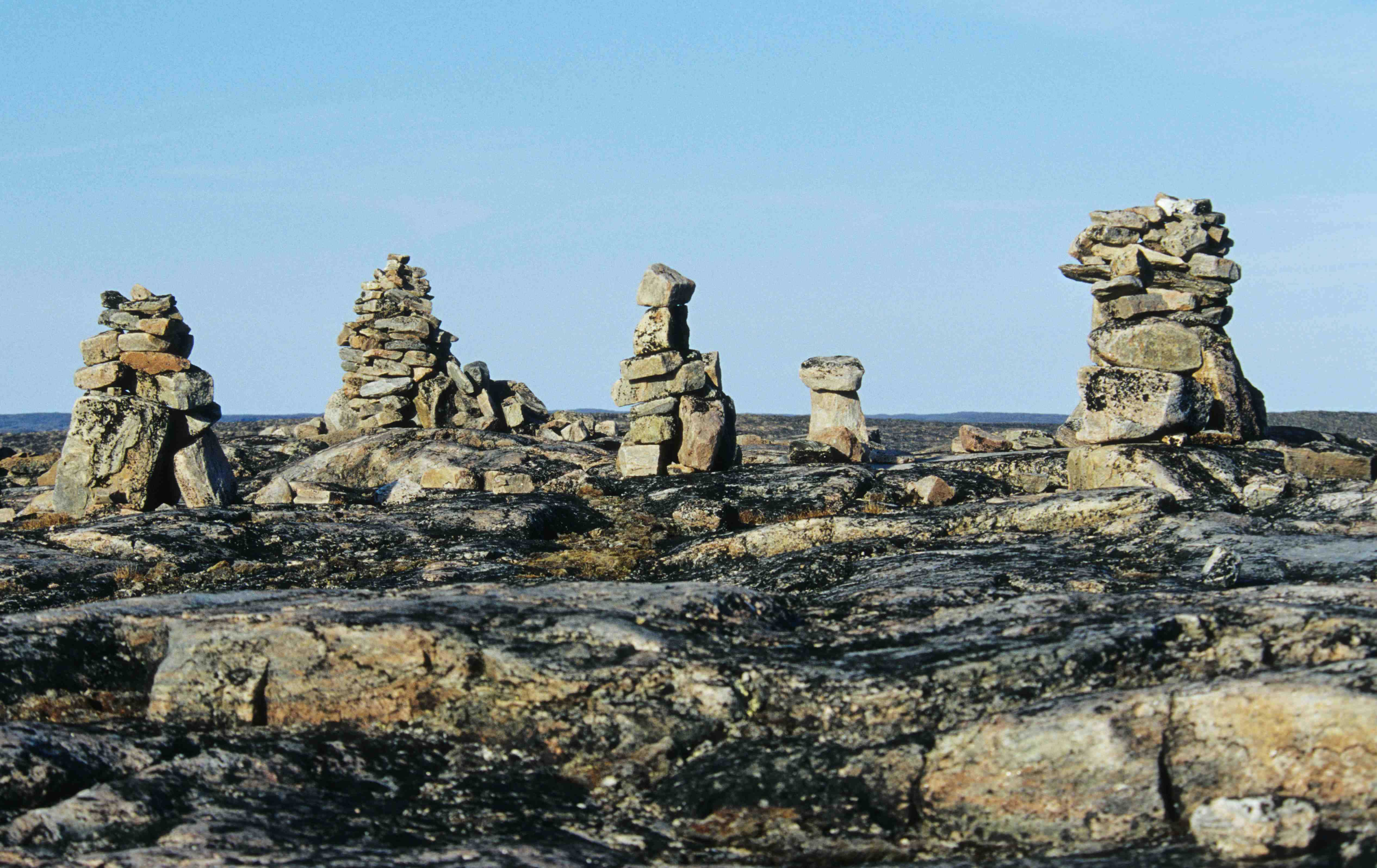
Inuksuit at the Foxe Peninsula (Baffin Island), Canada.

In Canada, the first Anglican mission post among Inuit was established in 1894 at the former whaling station, Uumanarjuaq, on Blacklead Island with the first Roman Catholic post created at Chesterfield Inlet (Igluligaarjuk) in 1912. Christianity subsequently spread rapidly among Canada's Inuit population. Often, the Christian missionaries were interested in recording Inuit traditions.

In the 20th century, the Canadian government pursued a policy of deliberately settling Inuit in permanent communities.

The Inughuit of northwest Greenland were all baptized by 1934, and the angakut were extinct among them by the mid-20th century. In eastern Greenland, the angakut remained in operation, largely unhindered by Christianity, until the early 20th century.

Traditional Inuit spirituality, including the role of angakkuuniq (shamanism), continues as part of Inuit cosmology and world-view today, although modified through contact with Christianity. A 2002 research and interview project with Inuit elders, found that while some Inuit reject shamanism out of Christian belief, others advocate for it, sometimes using Christian concepts, as a matter of preserving traditional identity and ways of life. The elders reported that angakkuit continue to practise in contemporary Inuit communities. Some practices of angakkuuniq may be proceeding today in hiding, which is not out of keeping with the discretion with which angakkuuniq was traditionally practised. The elders interviewed in 2002, while emphasizing that they were Christian, proposed that Christian ministry and angakkuuniq could each have their own differing benefits. They felt that although angakkuuniq came from the past, knowledge of it should be carried forward and the benefits that it could provide to modern Inuit should be carefully understood. They also suggested that angakkuuniq could be of benefit in dealing with contemporary Inuit social problems such as Indigenous suicide.

=== Revivalism ===
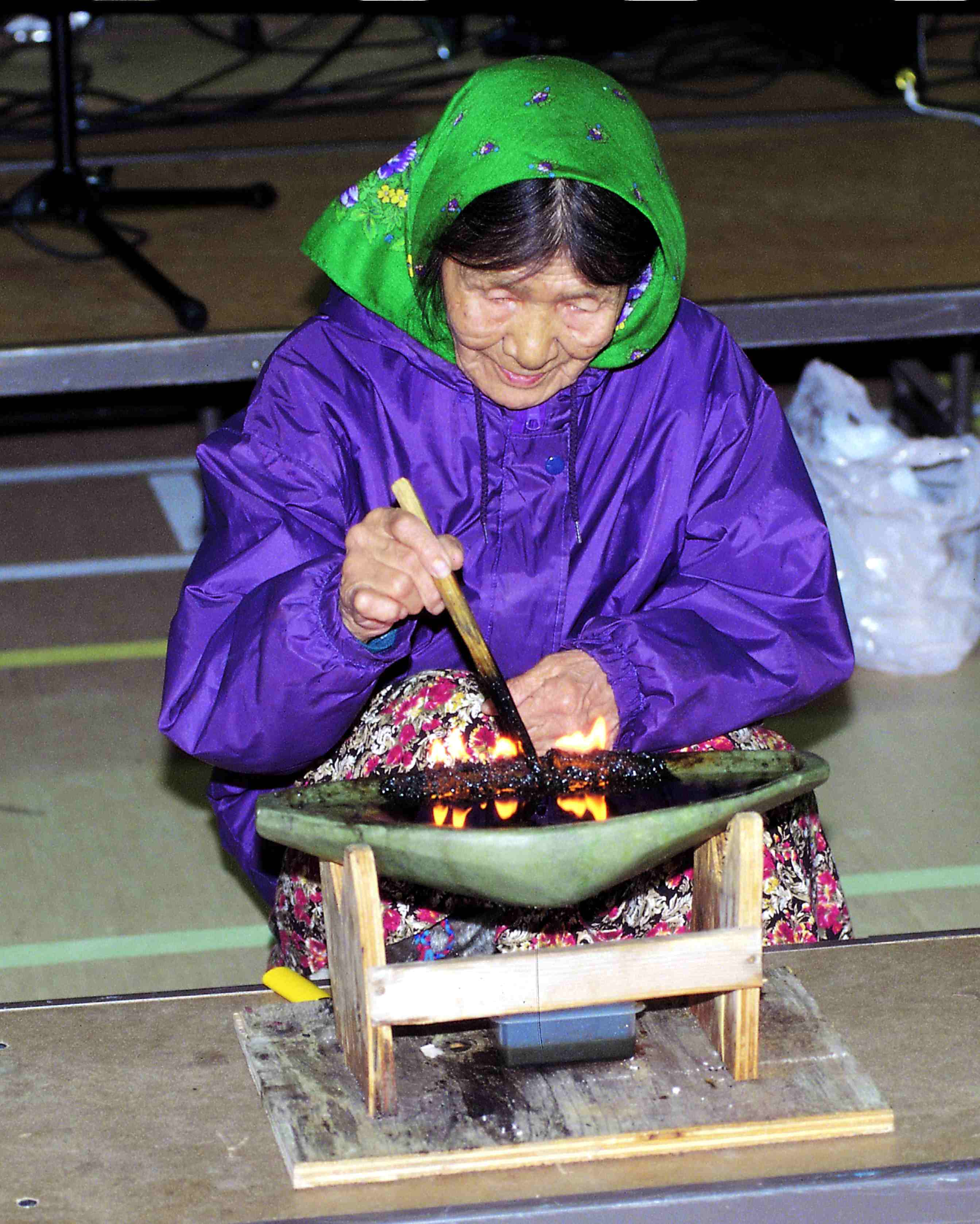
An Inuk woman lighting a qulliq (oil lamp) to mark the creation of Nunavut on 1 April 1999

During the 1970s, the emergence of a pan-Inuit ideology contributed to a growing appreciation of old Inuit traditions. The Inuit Cultural Institute launched in 1975. In 1999, the Nunavut government was established in Canada, something that assisted research into traditional Inuit culture.

In 1991, Merkur noted that Inuit religion was varyingly "extinct, obsolescent, and persisting", depending on the community in question.

== Demographics ==
As of as of 2021, 71 percent of Canadian Inuit identified as Christian.

== See also ==
- Inuit group, a set of satellites that orbit Saturn, many named after figures from Inuit religion
