= Religion in Greenland =

Religion in Greenland (2010)
1. Lutheranism (95.5%)
2. Catholicism (0.20%)
3. Other Christian (0.40%)
4. Inuit religion (0.80%)
5. Agnostic (2.30%)
6. Atheist (0.20%)
7. Baháʼí and Other Religions (0.60%)

The majority of the Greenlandic population is Christian and associates with the Church of Denmark via the Church of Greenland, which is Protestant in classification and Lutheran in orientation. The Church of Denmark is the established church through the Constitution of Denmark; this applies to all of the Kingdom of Denmark, except for the Faroe Islands, as the Church of the Faroe Islands became independent in 2007. But traditional Inuit spiritual beliefs remain strong in many of Greenland's remote communities.

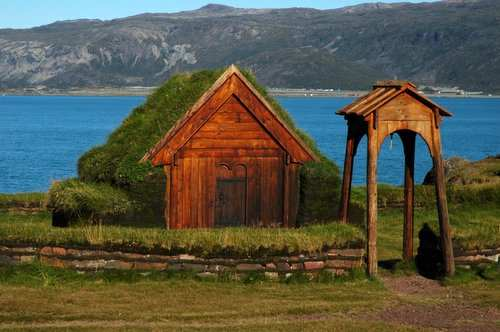
21st-century reproduction of Thjodhild's church at Brattahlíð, the first church in the Americas

== Christianity ==
Lutheranism, mostly represented by the Church of Denmark, is the predominant religious category within Christianity, followed by small communities of Baptists, Mormons, Roman Catholics, Jehovah's Witnesses, Seventh-day Adventists, Presbyterians, Calvinists, Evangelists, and Orthodox Christians.

=== History ===
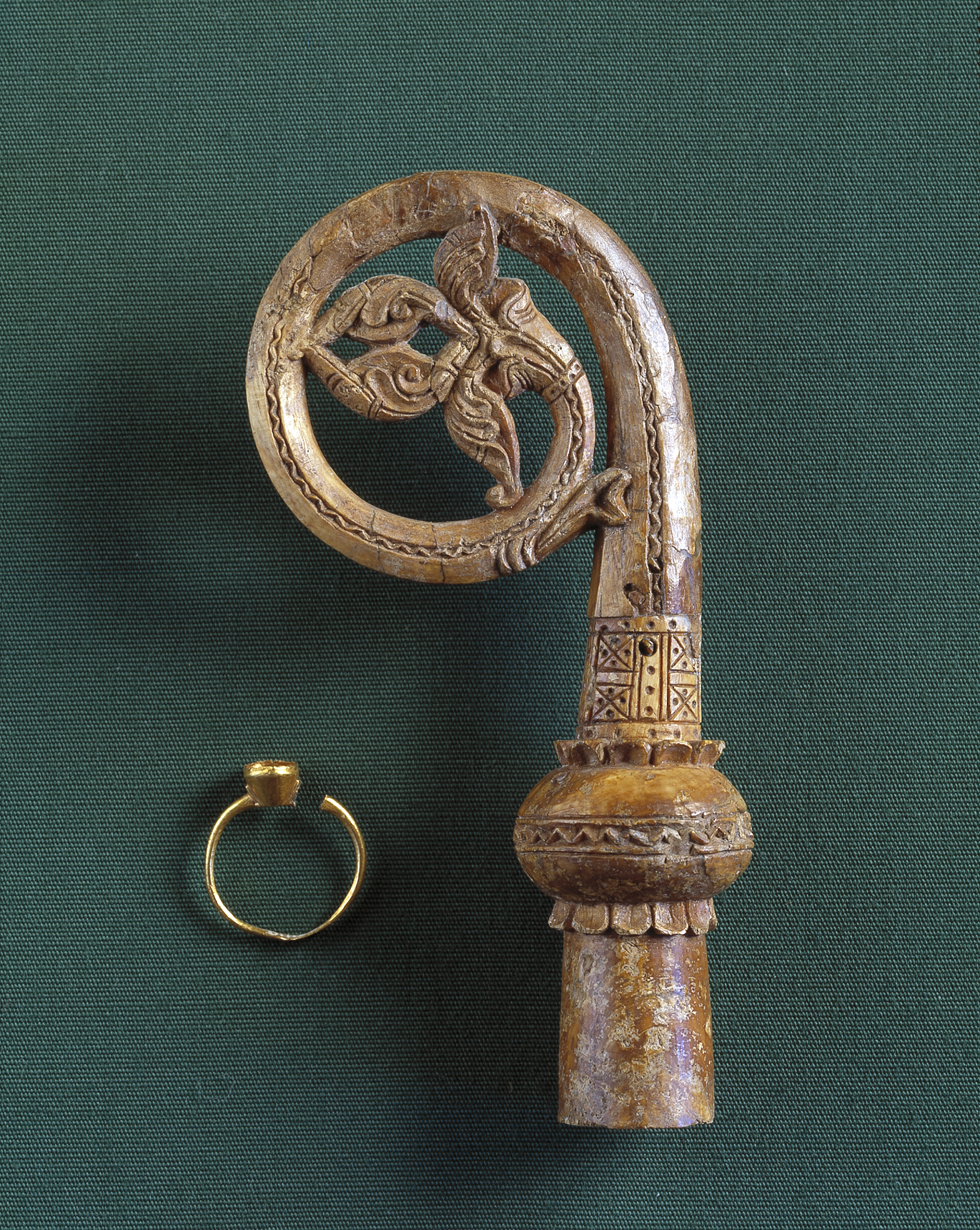
Crosier and episcopal ring of a 13th-century Greenlandic bishop. The skeleton from the grave has been radiocarbon dated to 1223-1290.

Christianity was first brought to Greenland in AD 1000 by Norse settlers. It is not certain what happened to the Norse but they eventually disappeared, likely because of an increasingly harsh climate, decline in trade with mainland Europe, and possibly conflicts with native tribes. The diocese of Greenland was known as the Diocese of Garðar. The first bishop of Garðar, Arnaldur, was ordained by the Archbishop of Lund in 1124. He arrived in Greenland in 1126 and began the construction of Garðar Cathedral which was dedicated to the patron saint of sailors, St Nicholas. This ancient diocese fell into disuse in the 14th century with the death of Bishop Álfurin 1377. Nonetheless, bishops were still appointed until 1537 and the Reformation in Denmark–Norway and Holstein, though none of these ever made it to Greenland. The Garðar Cathedral Ruins were inscribed on the UNESCO World Heritage List in 2017 as part of the Kujataa Greenland: Norse and Inuit Farming at the Edge of the Ice Cap site.

By the 18th century, the Norse returned. When Norway and Denmark separated in 1814, Greenland remained Danish, though with a certain degree of autonomy necessitated by its remoteness. Today, the Church of Denmark is still the predominant religious preference in the country, but with a degree of autonomy, including its own bishop, 19 parishes divided among 3 deaneries, 40 churches or chapels, and 25 vicars or priests.

=== Lutheranism ===
The Church of Greenland, consisting of the Diocese of Greenland, is the official Lutheran church in Greenland. A diocese of the Church of Denmark, it is now semi-independent and is led by the Bishop of Greenland, currently Paneeraq Siegstad Munk.

From 1905 to 1923 Greenland was part of the now derelict Diocese of Zealand. From 1923 to 1993 it was part of the Diocese of Copenhagen. In 1980 a bishop was appointed for Greenland on behalf of the Bishop of Copenhagen. The Diocese was only re-established in 1993 when it was renamed as the Diocese of Greenland, independent from the Diocese of Copenhagen. The Church of Greenland, in common with other institutions within the territory, is governed from Denmark, but with a large measure of autonomy. The Church of Greenland consists of a single diocese, which is part of the Danish church but is moving towards full independence. In this respect, it is following the example of the Church of the Faroe Islands, which is also a single diocese and achieved full independence from the Church of Denmark in July 2007. On 21 June 2009, the Church of Greenland was taken over by the local government of Greenland, where both funding and legislation now falls under the government of Greenland as opposed to other dioceses in the Church of Denmark who fall under the authority of the Danish parliament. Nonetheless, the Church of Greenland is still a diocese of the Church of Denmark.

In common with other evangelical episcopal Lutheran churches, the Church of Greenland recognises the historic three-fold ministry of bishops, priests, and deacons; it acknowledges the two dominical sacraments of baptism and the eucharist; it provides liturgies for other rites including confirmation, marriage, ordination, confession, and burial; its faith is based on scripture, the ancient creeds of the Church, and the Augsburg Confession. It is in full communion with the other Lutheran churches of the Nordic and Baltic states and with the Anglican churches of the British Isles. The clergy, who work with local parish councils, but are ordained and supervised by the bishop, work in a network of seventeen parishes, with churches and chapels across Greenland. Four senior priests hold the title of 'Dean' - one as Dean of the cathedral church, and three as Area Deans for the three deaneries, an administrative structure between the level of the diocese and that of the local parishes.

=== Catholicism ===
The Catholic Church in Greenland is part of the worldwide Catholic Church, under the spiritual leadership of the Pope in Rome. There are very few Catholics in this overwhelmingly Protestant territory. There are 50 registered Catholics and only approximately 4 native Greenlander Catholics out of a population of 57,000. They are part of the only Catholic parish in Greenland, in Nuuk, Greenland's capital. The whole island is under the jurisdiction of the Diocese of Copenhagen.

Catholicism was introduced to Greenland in the 11th century with the help of the King of Norway, establishing the first churches in the Western Hemisphere, and after much effort, the people of Greenland received a bishop. The church thrived with the Norse colony which saw its peak in the 14th century, and had an active relationship with Scandinavia and the European continent; the church also participated in the European exploration of the Americas. The abandonment of the colony around 1450 ended any church presence in Greenland and the Protestant Reformation in Denmark effectively shut Greenland from any Catholic presence until the 20th century, when freedom of religion was declared and a small permanent Catholic presence reestablished.

Greenland was part of the "Apostolic Prefecture of the Arctic Pole" based in Norway from 1855 to 1868. Since that time, Greenland has been under the Danish Catholic hierarchy, first the Apostolic Prefecture of Copenhagen, which was raised to a Vicariate Apostolic, and later a full Catholic Diocese. The territory was under the jurisdiction of the Vicar Apostolic of Copenhagen in the early 20th century. Catholic priests have been visiting Greenland since 1930, after the Bishop of Copenhagen, Benedictine monk Theodore Suhr, received permission from the Vatican to ask the Missionary Oblates of Mary Immaculate to missionize there. Catholic priests have also served with the United States military as chaplains in the 20th century.

State-enforced Lutheranism was kept in place until 1953 when religious liberty was declared. In the summer of 1980, the Little Sisters of Jesus established a fraternity in Nuuk with three sisters. In 2007, a global environmental summit was held in Nuuk at their Catholic church, which was attended by Catholic, Orthodox and United Nations officials, with the approval of Pope Benedict XVI.

== Inuit spiritual beliefs ==
Ethnographically 80% of the population is divided between the Inuit population and population mixed with Inuit and Danish. It is said that the Inuit population is descended from Siberians who crossed from Asia to North America on that island. Although less than 1% of the residents practice Inuit spiritual beliefs, the presence of shamanism is widespread.

== Islam ==
As of 2019, the only known Muslim living in Greenland is a Lebanese citizen named Wassam Azaqeer, who lives in Nuuk, where he runs a restaurant.

== Judaism ==
There currently is one Jewish man named Paul Cohen who has been living in the city of Narsaq, who works as a translator. Despite his remoteness, he says that tourists are always able to find him.
