= Kristian Mørch =

Former Greenlandic Bishop

The Right Reverend Kristian Mørch
- Bishop of Greenland
- Kristian Mørch
- Church: Church of Denmark
- Diocese: Greenland
- Elected: 1993
- In office: 1993–1995
- Successor: Sofie Petersen

Orders
- Ordination: 1958
- Consecration: 1984

Personal details
- Born: 5 April 1930 Uvkusigssat, Ûmának, North Greenland
- Died: 3 May 2017 (aged 87) Ilulissat, Greenland, Kingdom of Denmark
- Denomination: Lutheran
- Spouse: Elisabeth Mørch
- Education: University of Copenhagen

Kristian Mørch (5 April 1930 – 3 May 2017) was a Greenlandic Inuk prelate who became Greenland's first bishop in 1993 after the restoration of the Diocese of Greenland. He is also considered as the mastermind behind the formation of the Church of Greenland, distinct from the Church of Denmark.

== Biography ==
Kristian was born in 1930 in Ukkusissat, Uummannaq in Greenland. Later he went to Denmark, where he studied at the Haslev Seminarium and later theology at the University of Copenhagen where he undertook his theological exam in 1958. When he graduated, he immediately returned to Greenland. He worked as a priest in Qaqortoq for a short period of time before becoming a priest in Qaanaaq in 1959, where he served as a minister for more than 10 years in three different periods. He has also been a priest in Upernavik, Uummannaq, Ilulissat, and Nuuk until he was appointed bishop in 1993 and was responsible for supervising the testimony, priests, and catechists. He became Vice-Bishop in 1984 and nine years later Bishop of Greenland. As a priest and bishop, he has had a great influence on the people's church's point of view and development. Influence not only in relation to the organization of the church but also in relation to human contact, for example, with the theology students. When he retired in 1995, he moved from Nuuk to Ilulissat with his wife Elisabeth.

== National Identity ==
Mørch believed and insisted that Greenlandic students should return home to help build the country. According to an article in the Kristeligt Dagblad he advised Greenlandic students not to marry Danish women if they were not prepared to settle in Greenland.
