= Aulanerk =

Inuit deity

In Inuit mythology, Aulanerk is a friendly sea god who rules over the tides, waves and joy. He is said to be naked and living in the sea.

Whereas Aulanerk caused the waves, he works with the other gods who lead Inuit hunters to seals. Sedna, the goddess of the sea, is unfriendly and dissimilar to Aulanerk.

== Description ==
He is described as a naked man who lived in the ocean like a merman.
