= Nanortalik Church =

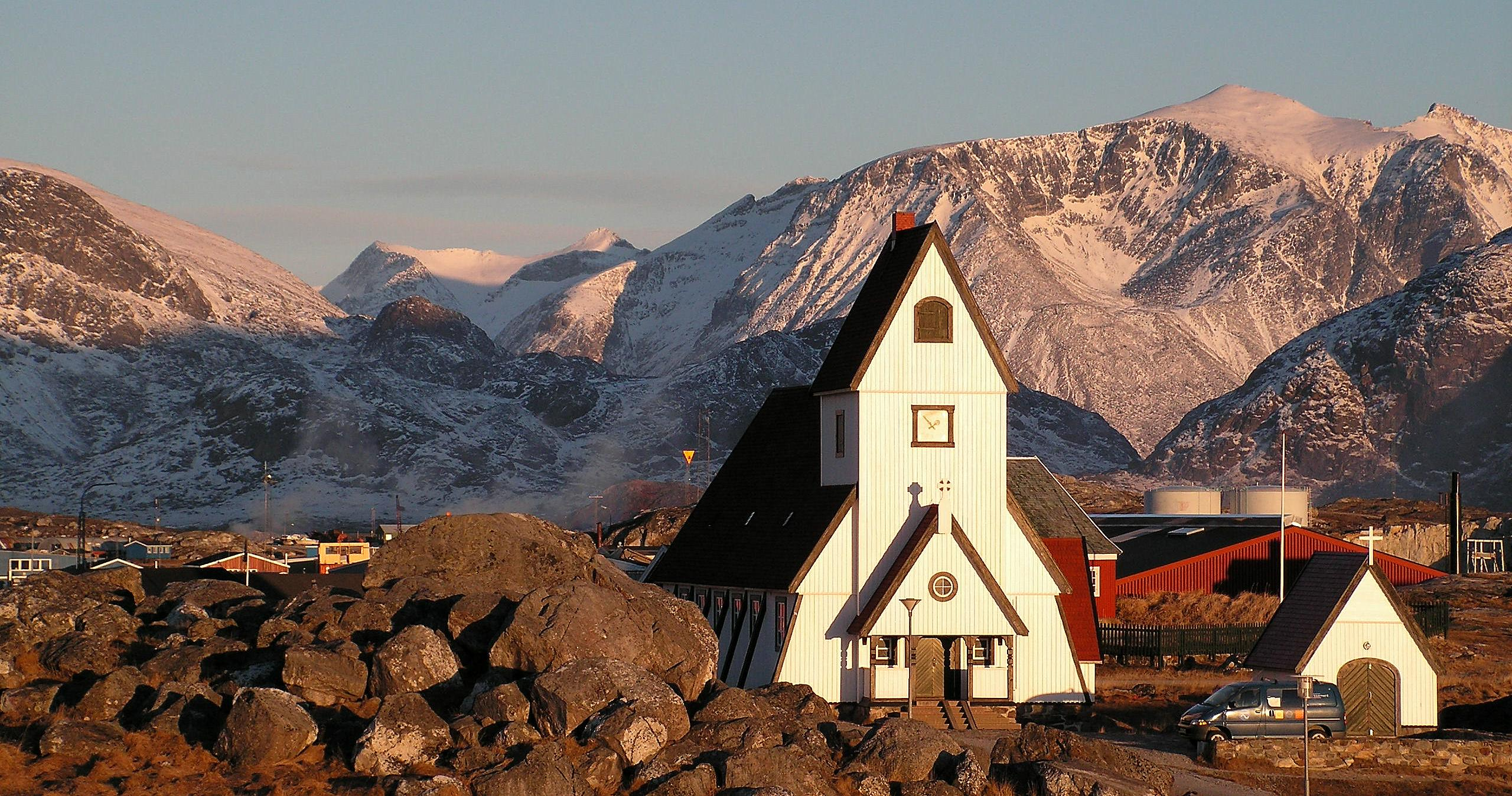

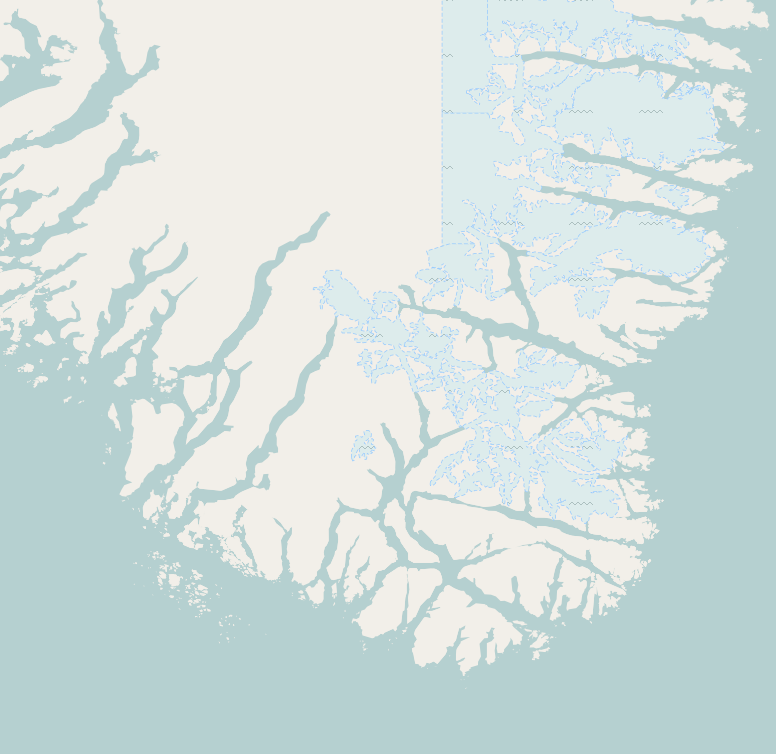
- Nanortalik Nanortalik Church (Greenland)
- 60°08′31″N 45°14′36″W
- Location: Nanortalik
- Country: Greenland; Kingdom of Denmark
- Denomination: Lutheran

History
- Founded: 1916

Administration
- Diocese: Diocese of Greenland

Clergy
- Bishop: Sofie Petersen

Nanortalik Church is a wooden, Danish Lutheran church in the town of Nanortalik in southern Greenland in the Arctic. The church was built and consecrated in 1916, and is currently the only church serving the Nanortalik congregation. The church is located in the old colonial quarter of the town. The church is deemed culturally significant and has enjoyed protected status since 2004.

The town of Nanortalik is currently assessing building an additional church for the congregation, citing problems with the current church being too small for bigger festivities.

A landmark Nanortalik boulder—called the Knud Rasmussen Stone—is located right next to the church.
