= Bishop of Greenland =

Diocesan Bishop of the Church of Denmark & Head of the Church of Greenland

- Bishopric

Lutheran
- Incumbent; Paneeraq Siegstad Munk

Information
- First holder: Kristian Mørch
- Established: 1 November 1993
- Diocese: Greenland
- Cathedral: Nuuk Cathedral

Website
- Website of the Diocese

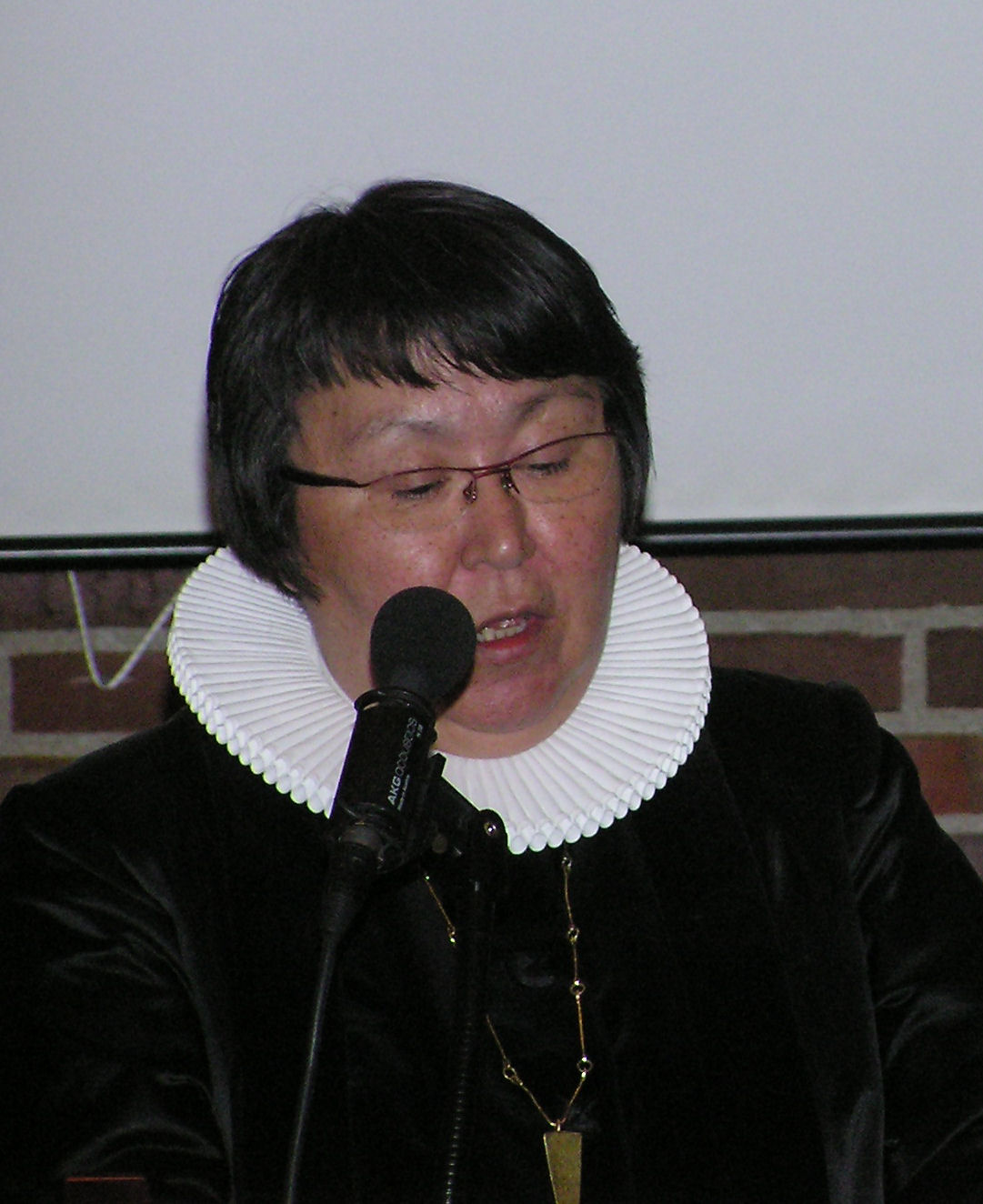
Bishop Sofie Petersen, Greenland

The Bishop of Greenland (Danish: Biskop af Grønland) is a diocesan bishop of the Church of Denmark, and the leader of the Church of Greenland, which is an episcopal church in the Lutheran tradition.

== History ==
Historically (before the Reformation) the Bishop of Greenland was known as the Bishop of Garðar. After the reformation, the diocese fell into disuse. In 1984 Kristian Mørch was appointed as vice-bishop to oversee and work in Greenland as a resident bishop. It was only in 1993 that a diocese was once more established in Greenland with its name changed to the Diocese of Greenland and the bishop known as the bishop of Greenland. Kristian Mørch became the first bishop.

== Bishops of Greenland ==
- Kristian Mørch (1993–1995)
- Sofie Petersen (1995–2020), an accomplished theologian. During her episcopacy she personally oversaw the introduction of a new translation of the Bible in Greenlandic, as well as a Greenlandic language hymnal, and a Greenlandic edition of the (originally Danish language) prayer book of the Church of Denmark.
- Paneeraq Siegstad Munk became Bishop of Greenland on 1 December 2020, the third Bishop since the re-establishment of the diocese in Greenland.
