= Statue of the Mother of the Sea =

Statue in Nuuk, Greenland

- Sassuma Arnaa (Greenlandic), Havets Moder (Danish)
- Artist: Christian "Nuunu" Rosing
- Year: 2007
- Type: Granite
- Subject: Sedna
- Location: Nuuk, Greenland; 64°10′43.16″N 51°44′45.92″W

The Statue of the Mother of the Sea (Greenlandic: Sassuma Arnaa; Danish: Havets Moder) is a monument in Nuuk, Greenland. It commemorates the Inuit goddess Sedna. The statue lies on at shore next to Nuuk Cathedral, in the historical Old Nuuk area of the city.

It's only 100 metres from the Statue of Hans Egede, together representing two different aspects of Greenland's history.

== Background ==
In 2004, the municipal council in Nuuk was interested in a piece of art representing Greenland's pre-Christian history. Sculptor Christian Rosing gave a presentation about his idea of a statue representing the Sedna story. It was approved. Rosing began work in 2004, and the statue was unveiled on 25 September 2007.

The statue is made from a 9-ton block of red Swedish granite from Ørbæk, Denmark. This was controversial as the statue was meant to represent Greenland's pre-Nordic past, but local Greenlandic granite has cracks that makes it a poor choice for a statue.

== Subject ==
Sedna — better known in Greenland as Sassuma Arnaa — is a goddess of the sea who lives on the ocean floor. The statue sits at the water's edge, in the intertidal zone. It is visible at low tide and underwater at high tide.

The statue depicts her with a host of sea animals and an angakkoq, a shaman, combing Sassuma Arnaa's hair. Traditionally, angakkut go to pacify and negotiate with Sassuma Arnaa when she is cross and withholding marine animals from hunters.
