= Nuuk Cathedral =

- The Cathedral of Our Saviour
- Annaassisitta Oqaluffia (Vor Frelser Domkirke)
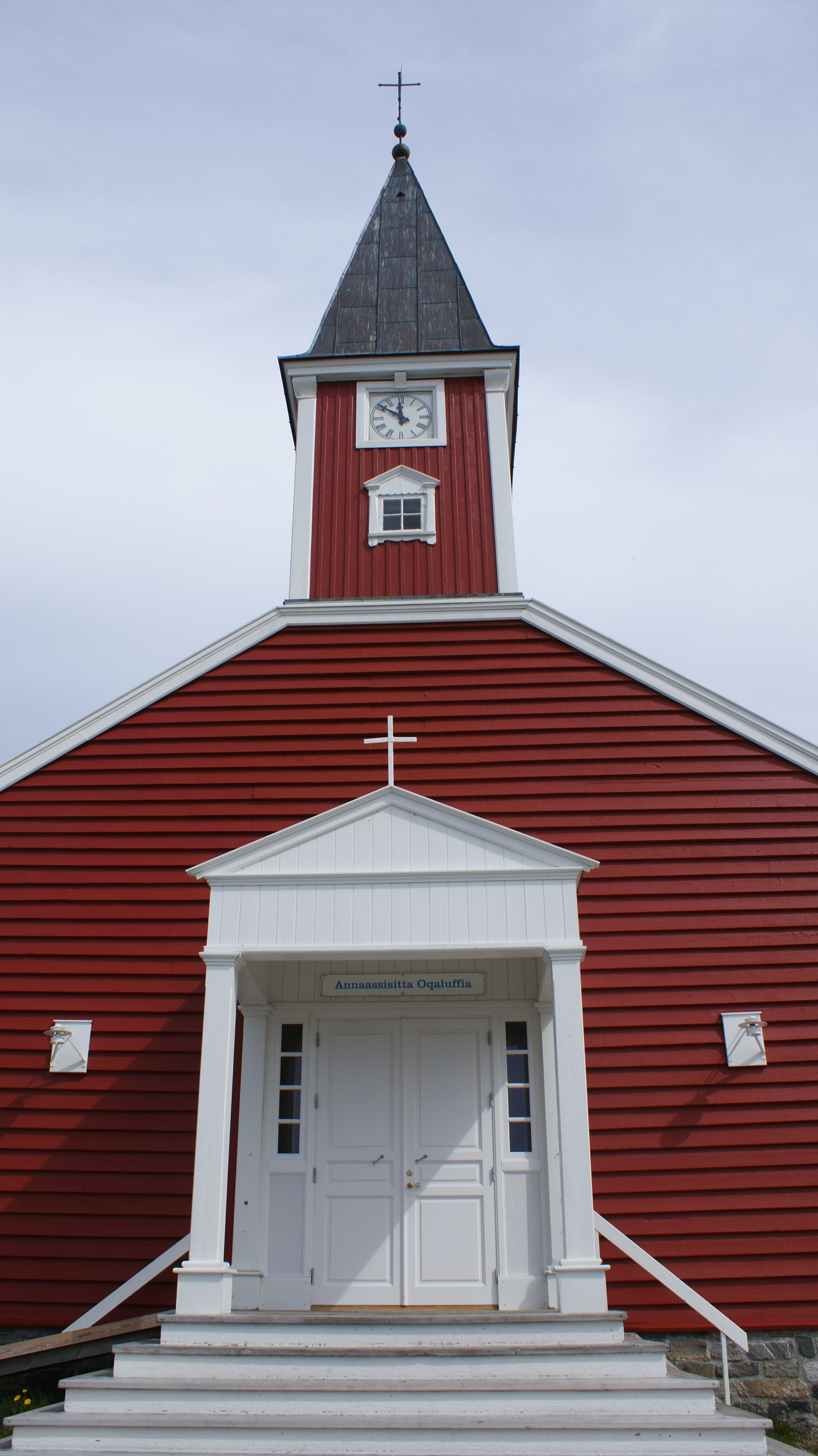

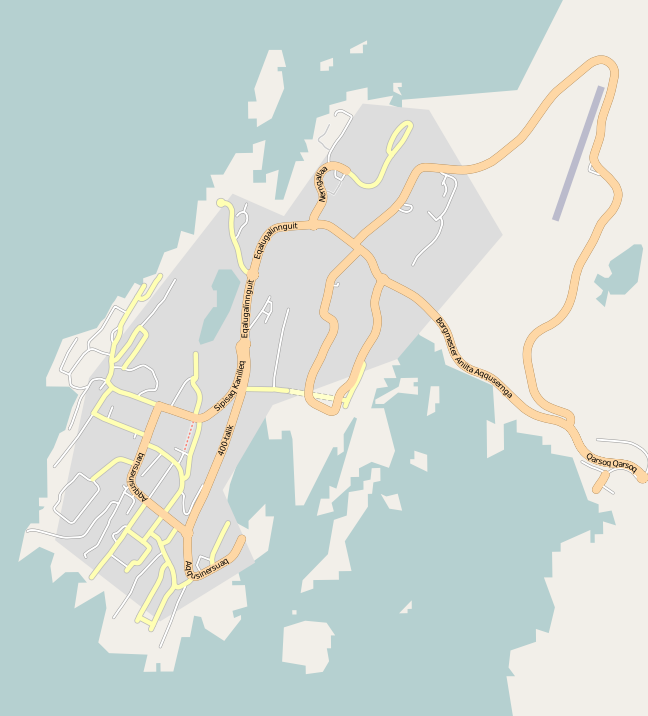
- Location in Nuuk
- 64°10′47″N 51°44′39″W
- Location: Nuuk
- Country: Greenland; Kingdom of Denmark
- Denomination: Church of Denmark

History
- Founded: 1849
- Dedication: Christ the Saviour

Administration
- Diocese: Diocese of Greenland

Clergy
- Bishop: Paneeraq Siegstad Munk

Nuuk Cathedral or Church of Our Saviour (Greenlandic: Annaassisitta Oqaluffia, Danish: Vor Frelser Kirke) is a wooden Lutheran cathedral in the Old Nuuk neighborhood of Nuuk, the capital of Greenland. It was established in 1849. The red building with its spire is a prominent site on the landscape. During National Day celebrations, large crowds usually gather around the church.

== History ==
The church was built from 1848 to 1849, and was consecrated on April 6, 1849. It was paid for in full by Karen Ørsted’s Fund. When it was consecrated it became the church of Nuuk congregation, replacing the responsibilities of many older Nuuk churches, the oldest of which was from 1758.

Until May 6, 1993, the Cathedral of Copenhagen was also the Cathedral of Greenland, but when the Law of Greenland's Church and School became effective on May 6, 1993, the church officially became the Cathedral of Greenland. The first bishop of Greenland in 616 years was Kristian Mørk who was ordained in 1994, the previous bishop of Greenland was Álfur Last-Bishop in 1378. Mørk vacated the seat the next year, and 39-year-old Greenland native Sofie Petersen became bishop of Greenland. Petersen is the second woman to become a bishop in the Church of Denmark.

The annex building next to the cathedral is the actual seat of the bishop of Greenland, the cathedral itself does not hold the seat.

== Construction ==
Originally the church was constructed with so called half timbering, a timber framing for soapstone and talc. Later the building was externally paneled with red wood panels. In conjunction with the outside paneling, the interior was paneled as well, the inside panels are painted white. The wooden church tower is a later add-on, it was erected in 1928. The church got electric power in 1949. In 2008 the tower clock underwent a 14-day restoration and the mechanical movement was replaced by a digital one.

The two big brass candelabras at the altar are a gift from the Church of Norway.

The organ of the church is an 11-rank 1970 Marcussen & Søn.

== Landmarks ==
The Statue of Hans Egede is located on the hill above the church. The statue is a 1921 copy of the statue in front of the Marble Church in Copenhagen. In front of the cathedral is a bronze bust of the celebrated organist Jonathan Petersen. Petersen was a well-known writer of psalms, as well as a gifted organist.

== Gallery ==
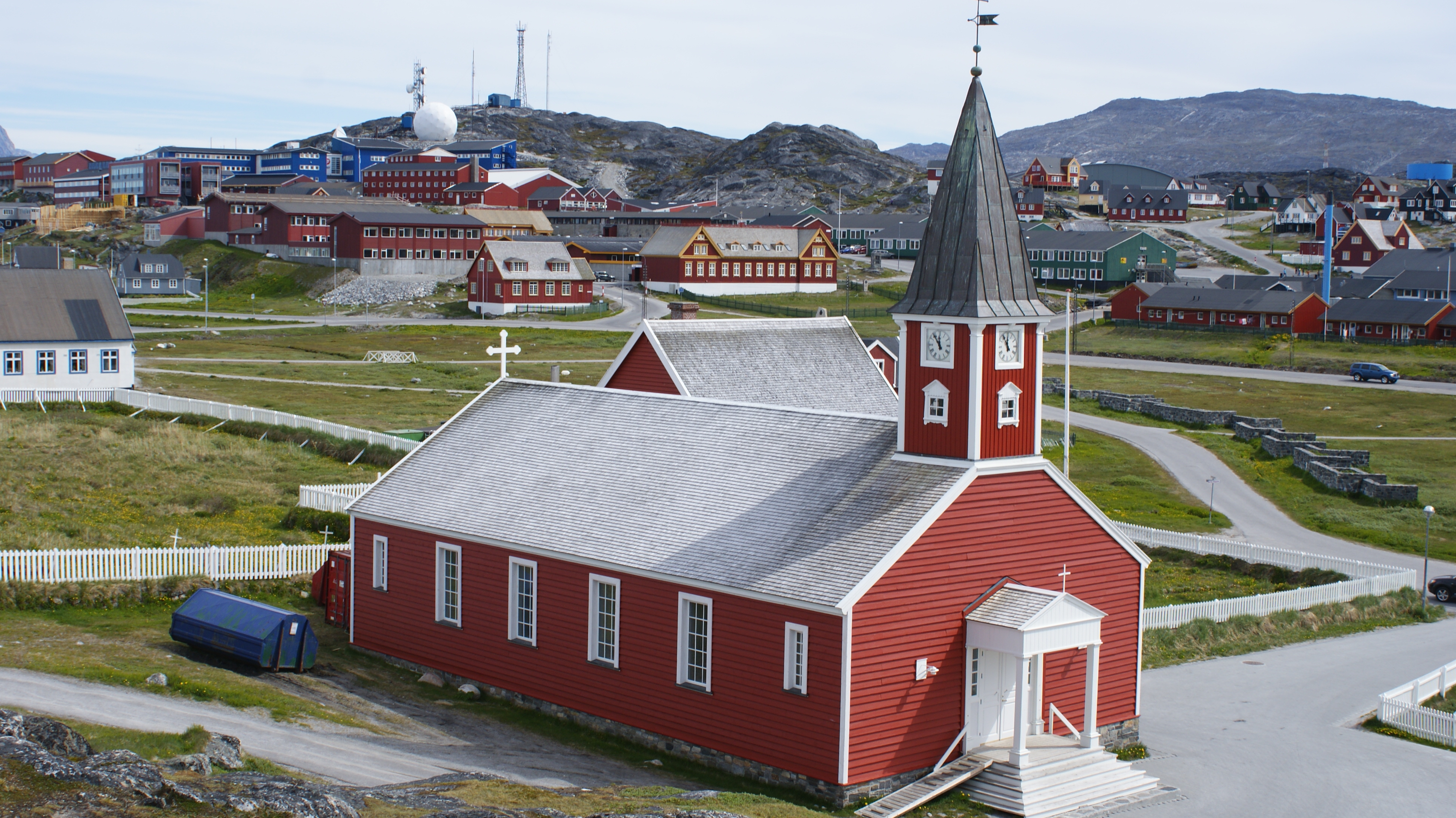
View of the church

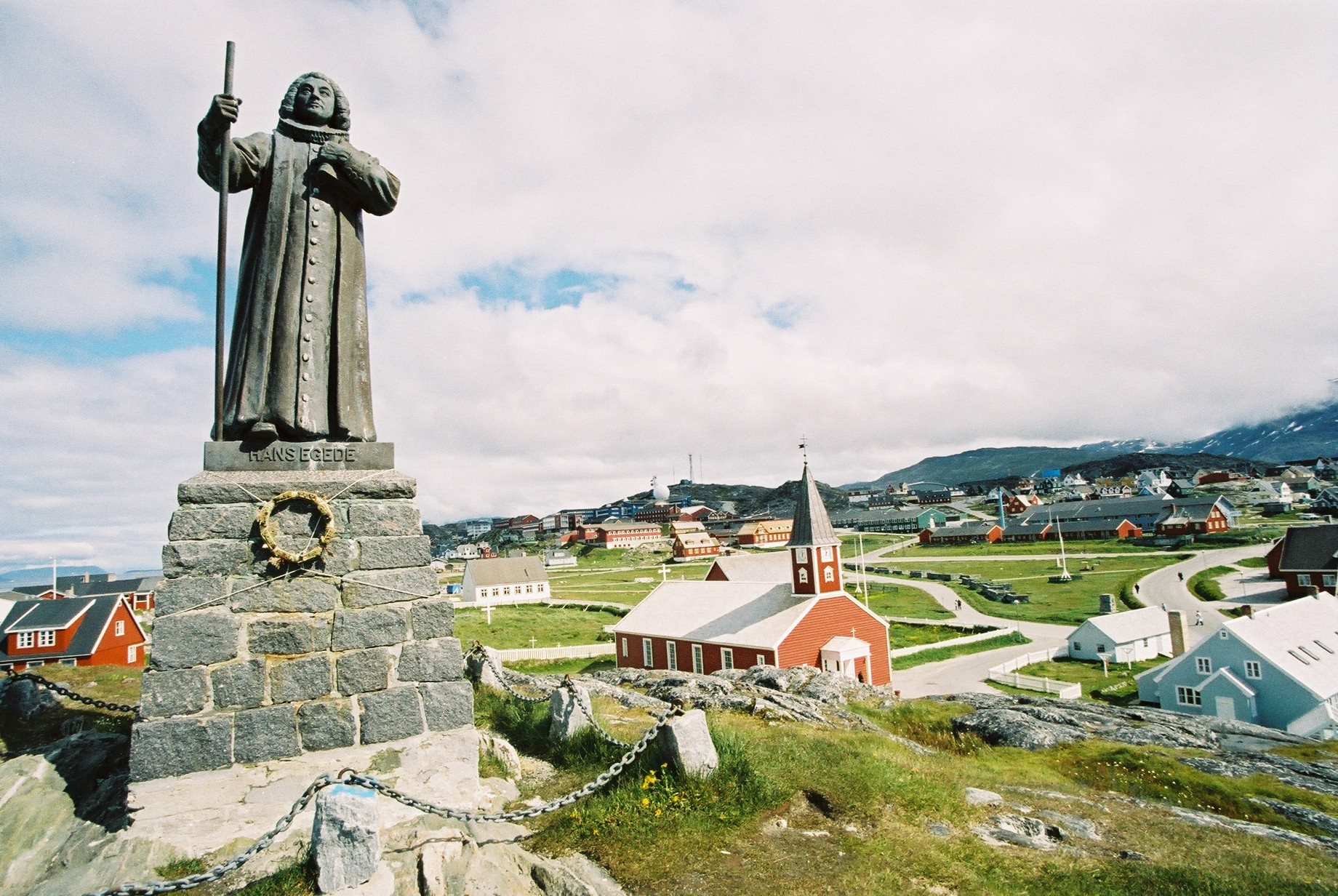
Statue of Hans Egede
