= Church of Greenland =

Official Lutheran Church of Greenland

Diocese of Greenland Kalaallit Nunaanni Ilagiit (Greenlandic) Grønland Stift (Danish)
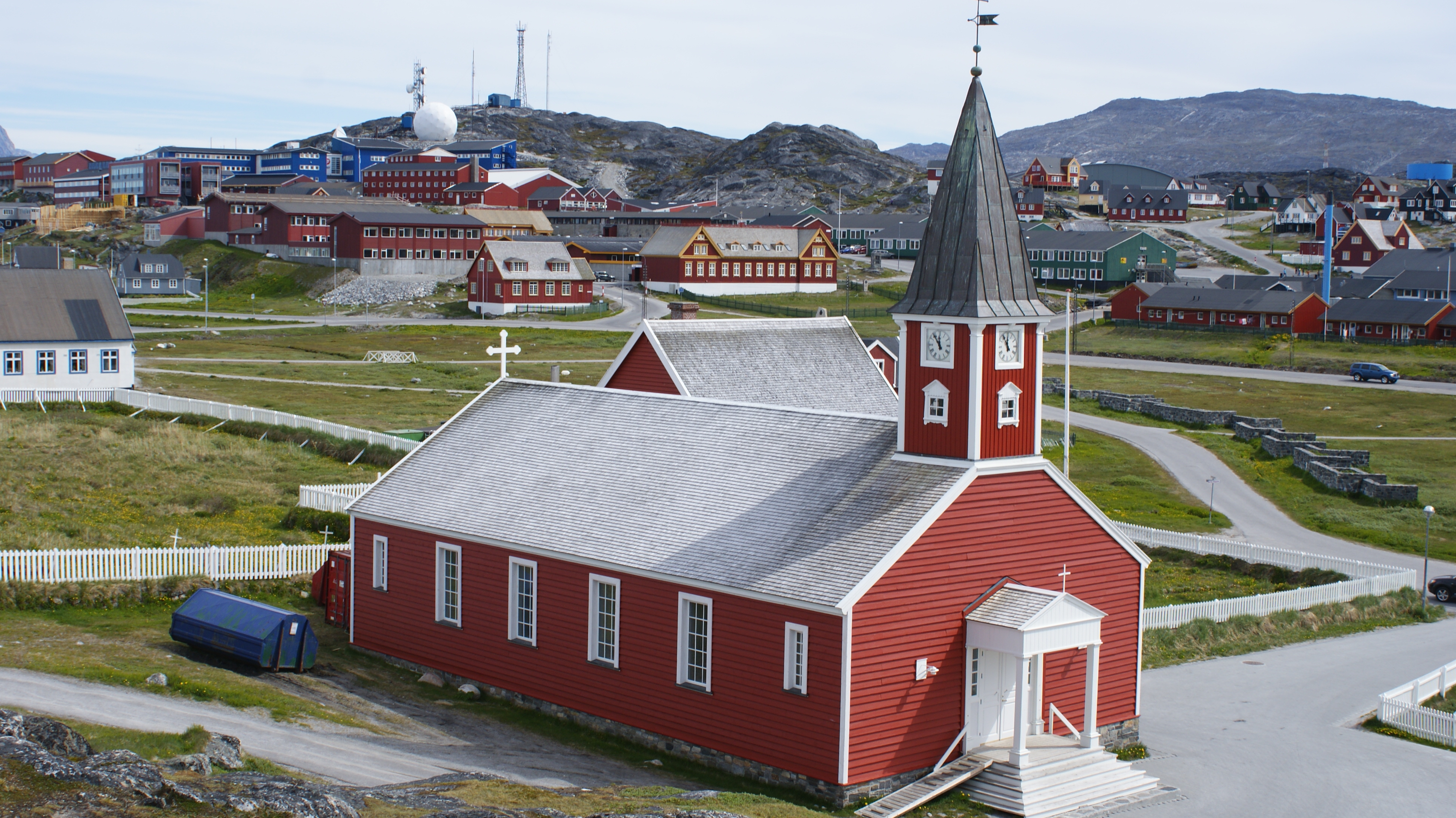
- The cathedral of the diocese, the only cathedral in Greenland

Location
- Country: Greenland; Kingdom of Denmark
- Deaneries: 3
- Subdivisions: 17
- Headquarters: Nuuk

Statistics
- Area: 2,166,086 km^{2} (836,330 sq mi)
- Members: 51,869 (91.48%)

Information
- Denomination: Lutheran
- Established: 12th century (as Diocese of Garðar); 1 November 1993 (as Diocese of Greenland)
- Dissolved: 1537 (as Diocese of Garðar)
- Cathedral: Nuuk Cathedral
- Language: Greenlandic; Danish

Leadership
- Parent church: Church of Denmark
- Bishop: Paneeraq Siegstad Munk

Website
- Website of the Diocese

The Church of Greenland (Greenlandic: Ilagiit, lit. 'The Congregation'; Danish: Grønland Stift), consisting of the Diocese of Greenland, is the official Lutheran church in Greenland. A diocese of the Church of Denmark, it is now semi-independent and is led by the Bishop of Greenland. Paneeraq Siegstad Munk became Bishop in 2020.

== History ==
Before the Reformation, the Diocese of Greenland was known as the Diocese of Garðar. This ancient diocese fell into disuse in the 14th century with the death of Bishop Álfur in 1378. Nonetheless, bishops were still appointed up until 1537, though none of these ever made it to Greenland.

From 1905 to 1923 Greenland was part of the now defunct Diocese of Zealand. From 1923 to 1993 it was part of the Diocese of Copenhagen, after which the bishopric's independence was restored after a trial period where bishops were appointed.

== Independent status ==
The Church of Greenland, in common with other institutions within the territory, is governed from Denmark, but with a large measure of autonomy. The Church of Greenland consists of a single diocese, which is part of the Danish church, but is moving towards full independence. In this respect it is following the example of the Church of the Faroe Islands, which is also a single diocese, and achieved full independence from the Church of Denmark in July 2007.

On June 21, 2009, the Church of Greenland was taken over by the local government of Greenland, where both funding and legislation now falls under the government of Greenland as opposed to other dioceses in the Church of Denmark who fall under the authority of the Danish parliament. Nonetheless, the Church of Greenland is still a diocese of the Church of Denmark.

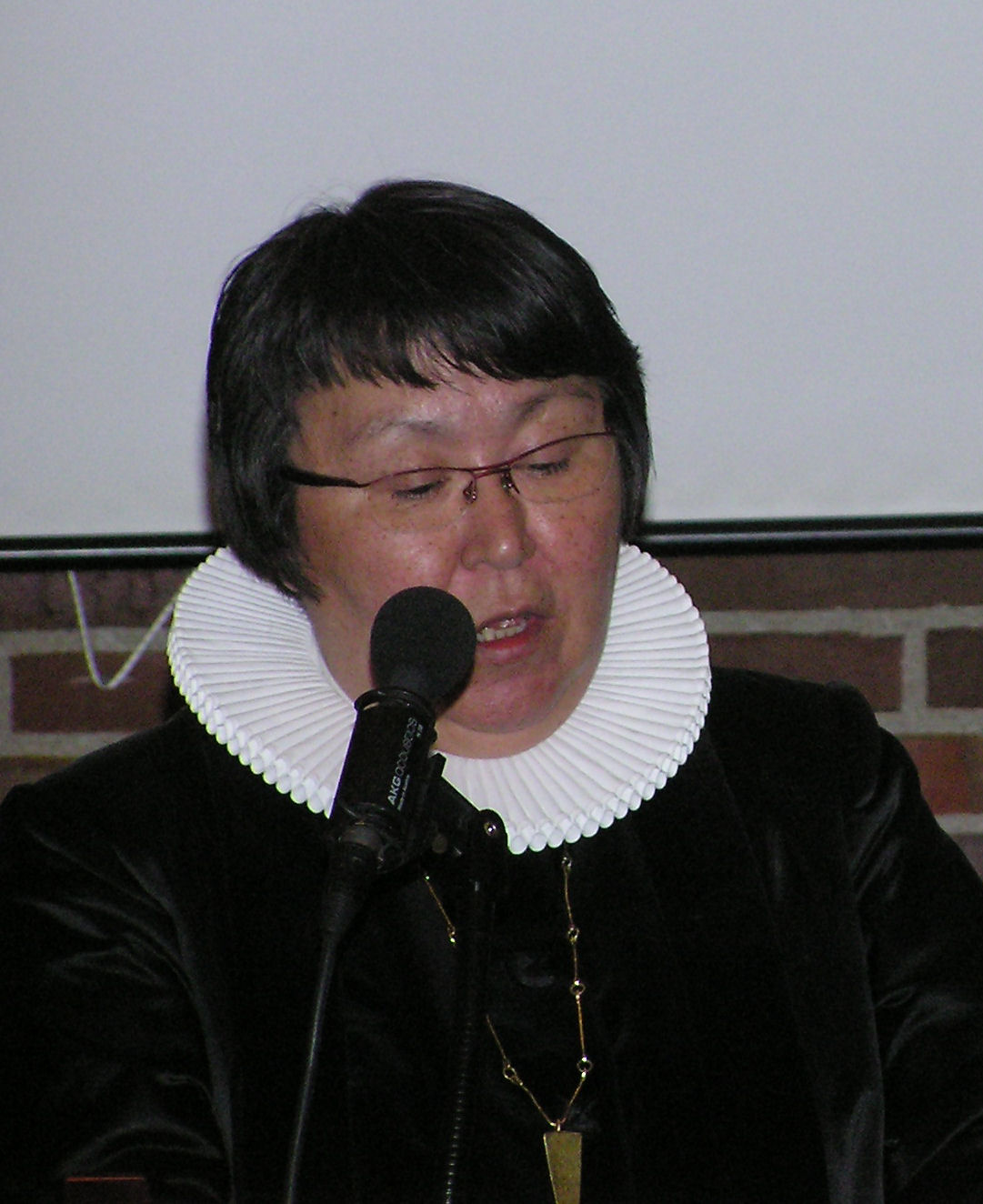
Sofie Petersen, Bishop of Greenland from 1995 to 2020

== Church structure ==
In common with other evangelical episcopal Lutheran churches, the Church of Greenland recognises the historic three-fold ministry of bishops, priests, and deacons; it acknowledges the two dominical sacraments of baptism and the eucharist; it provides liturgies for other rites including confirmation, marriage, ordination, confession, and burial; its faith is based on scripture, the ancient creeds of the Church, and the Augsburg Confession. It is in full communion with the other Lutheran churches of the Nordic and Baltic states, and with the Anglican churches of the British Isles.

The clergy, who work with local parish councils, but are ordained and supervised by the bishop, work in a network of seventeen parishes, with churches and chapels across Greenland. Four senior priests hold the title of 'Dean' - one as Dean of the cathedral church, and three as Area Deans for the three deaneries, an administrative structure between the level of the diocese and that of the local parishes.

== Membership statistics ==
Year	Population	Church members	Percent
2012	56,749	53,861	94.91
2013	56,370	53,409	94.75
2014	56,282	53,310	94.72
2015	55,984	52,987	94.65
2016	55,847	52,756	94.47
2017	55,860	52,725	94.39
2018	55,877	52,722	94.35
2019	55,993	52,634	94.00
2020	56,081	52,513	93.64
2021	56,421	52,647	93.31
2022	56,562	52,553	92.91
2023	56,608	52,164	92.15
2024	56,699	51,869	91.48
2025	56,542	51,529	91.13

Line graph of membership trends since 2012

== See also ==
- Religion in Greenland
