= Statue of Hans Egede =

Statue in Nuuk, Greenland

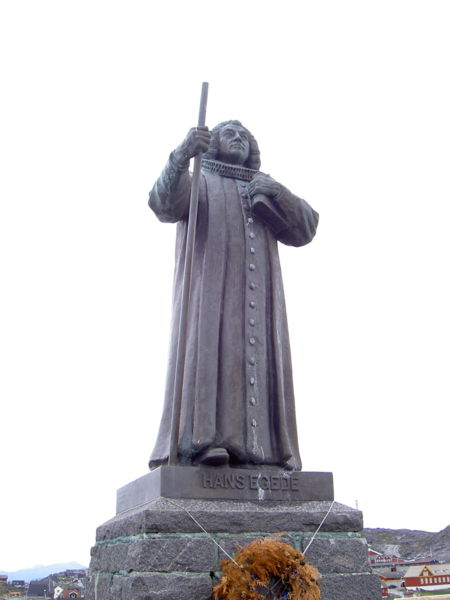
- Type: Bronze
- Location: Nuuk, Greenland; 64°10′46.6″N 51°44′43.9″W

The Statue of Hans Egede is a monument in Nuuk, Greenland. It commemorates the Dano-Norwegian Lutheran missionary Hans Egede who founded Nuuk in 1728. Funded by Greenlanders, the statue lies on a hill near the shore above Nuuk Cathedral in the historical Old Nuuk area of the city. The original statue by August Saabye stands outside Frederik's Church in Copenhagen. Egede's controversial missionary practices have recently attracted vandalism and calls for removal of the monument.

== Background ==
Egede arrived in Nuuk under Danish patronage to convert Norse settlers to Christianity. The Norse settlers, however, had moved and Egede instead encountered the Indigenous population. Egede's arrival and subsequent stay was not welcomed by these communities. After roughly ten years of work, Egede returned to Denmark. This was due in part to the deaths of his men and his wife along with the strain of running the colony.

== Funding ==
The statue itself was paid for by Greenlanders and erected in 1922. The project was meant to coincide with the 200th anniversary of Egede's arrival in Greenland. The funds were raised by private collection under secular and religious authorities as well as through donations provided by churchgoers in Denmark. Until 1953, Greenland was still a Danish colony and the country did not receive self-governing autonomy until 2009. Views of the statue have evolved as attitudes towards Denmark change.

== Formal qualities ==
The statue of Hans Egede stands on a cobblestone base. Under his feet is a pedestal with an inscription of his name. Together, the statue and pedestal stand at roughly 7-feet tall. One foot steps out to indicate foreword motion. Egede stands up straight, holding a pastoral staff in his right hand and a bible in his left. He is dressed in the simple robes of a monk, his face maintaining a neutral expression as he looks outward.

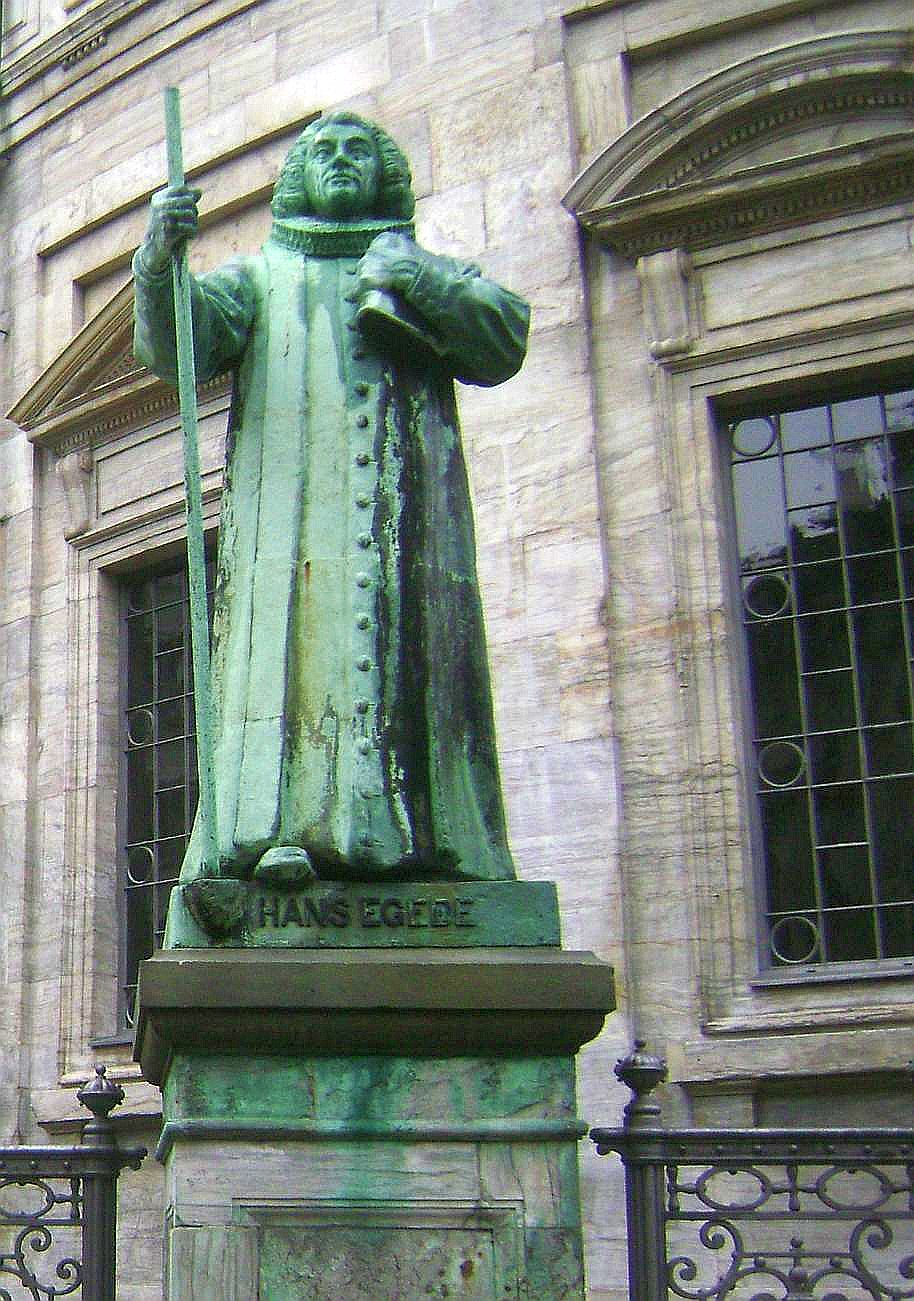
Statue of Hans Egede outside Frederik's Church in Copenhagen

This statue of Egede is a copy of a statue created by August Saabye in 1913 and placed outside Frederik's Church in Copenhagen. Here, Egede is in the same pose wearing the same attire, resting on the inscribed pedestal above a stone base.

== Recent controversies ==
The statue of Egede in Nuuk was doused in red paint on June 21, 2020, the national day of Greenland, or Kalaallit Nunaat as it is known in Greenlandic. Along with the red paint, the word "decolonize" was written along the base. Inuit symbols representing traditional Tunniit tattoos were marked on the pedestal and the pastoral staff that Egede holds was turned into a whip. This was also done to the Hans Egede statue in Copenhagen.

This is not the first time the statue has been vandalized. Incidents had been reported in the 1970s, 2012, and 2015. The first reported act of dousing the statue in red paint in 1973 was followed by a plaque placed at the foot of the statue reading "Was it not he who killed our souls? Should we continue to honour him?" The group responsible released an anonymous statement saying, "It is about time that we stop celebrating colonisers and that we start taking back what is rightfully ours... No coloniser deserves to be on top of a mountain like that." The Greenlandic artist Aqqalu Berthelsen, who delivered the message for the group, has called for all statues of Egede to be removed due to their representation of "oppression and colonisation." Police investigation into the matter led to the questioning of suspects, but within Greenland there is no clear consensus on what should happen with the statue. The statue has also been target of a number of satirical cartoons by Robert Holmene and Kunuk Platou, among others.

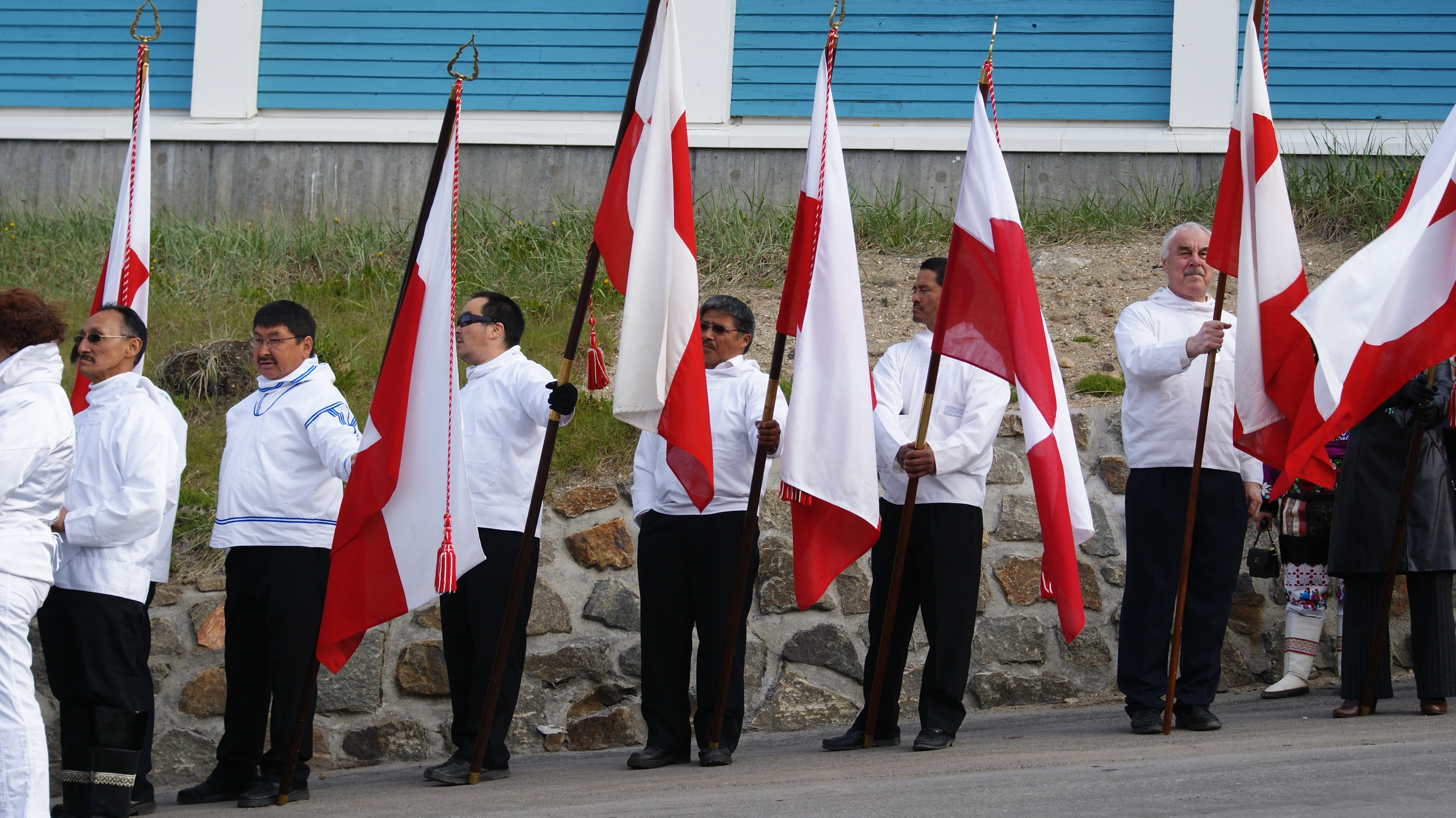
Greenland's National Day celebrations

A poll conducted in July 2020 showed 923 people in favor of the Hans Egede statue to remain up while 600 voted for its removal (23,000 people were eligible to vote). The voting was conducted in the Sermersooq municipality alone, a municipality that includes Nuuk. Not counted were the people who want the statue removed but placed in a museum. Even with this vote, what is to be done with the statue is yet to be determined by local council, which maintains that the statue can only be removed with the support of at least 75% of Greenlandic people.

Only 100 metres away is the Statue of the Mother of the Sea, a monument to an Inuit goddess installed in 2007, representing Greenland's pre-Christian history.

== Gallery ==
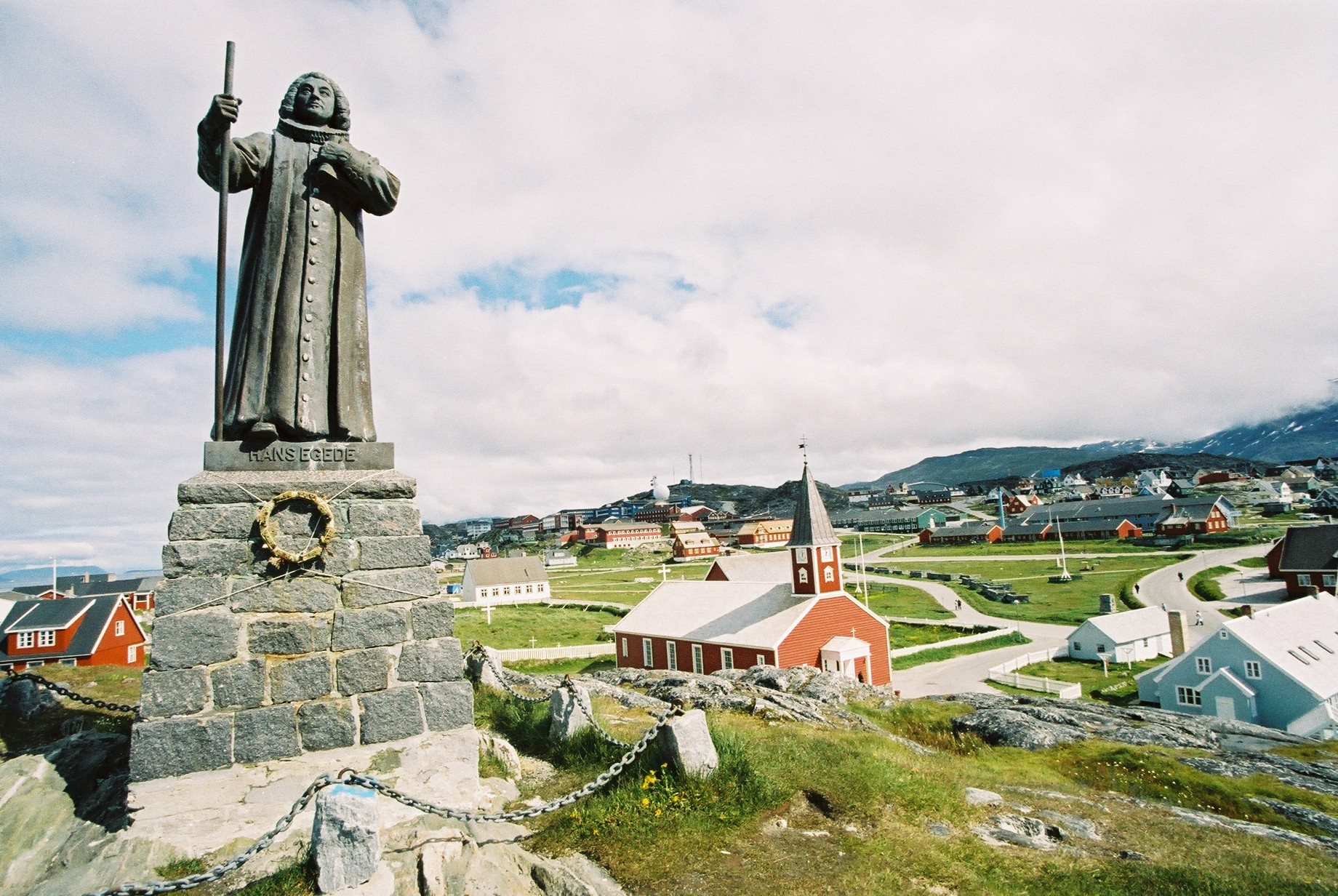
Statue of Hans Egede in the foreground with Nuuk Cathedral in the background

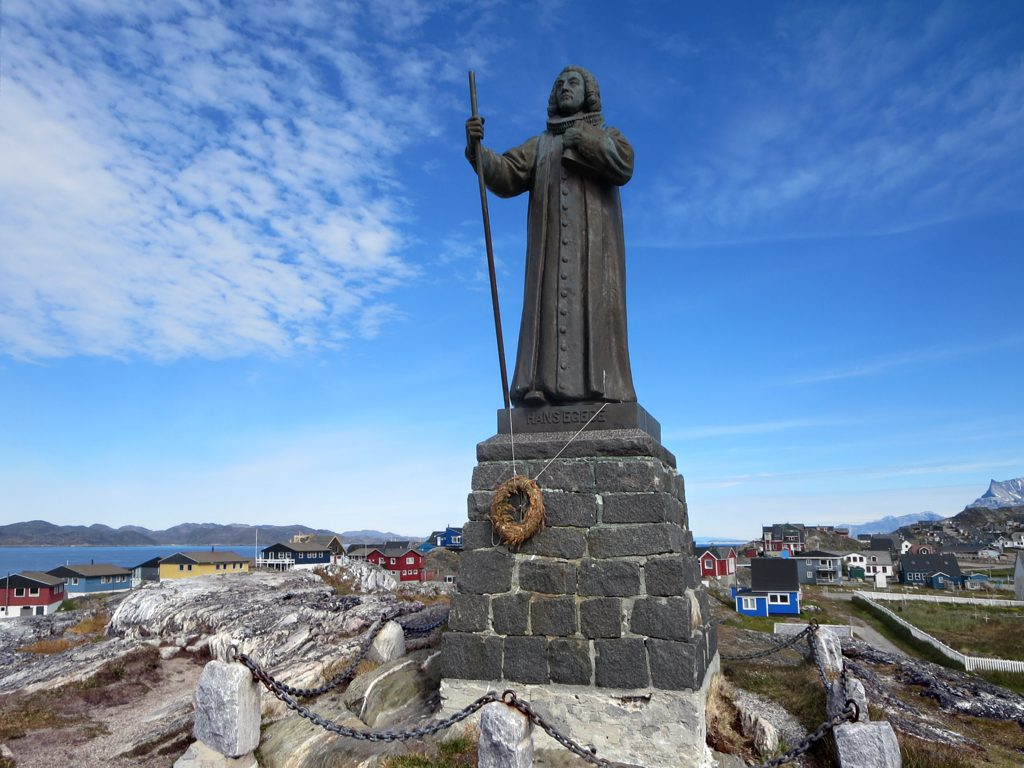
Statue with houses of Nuuk in the background

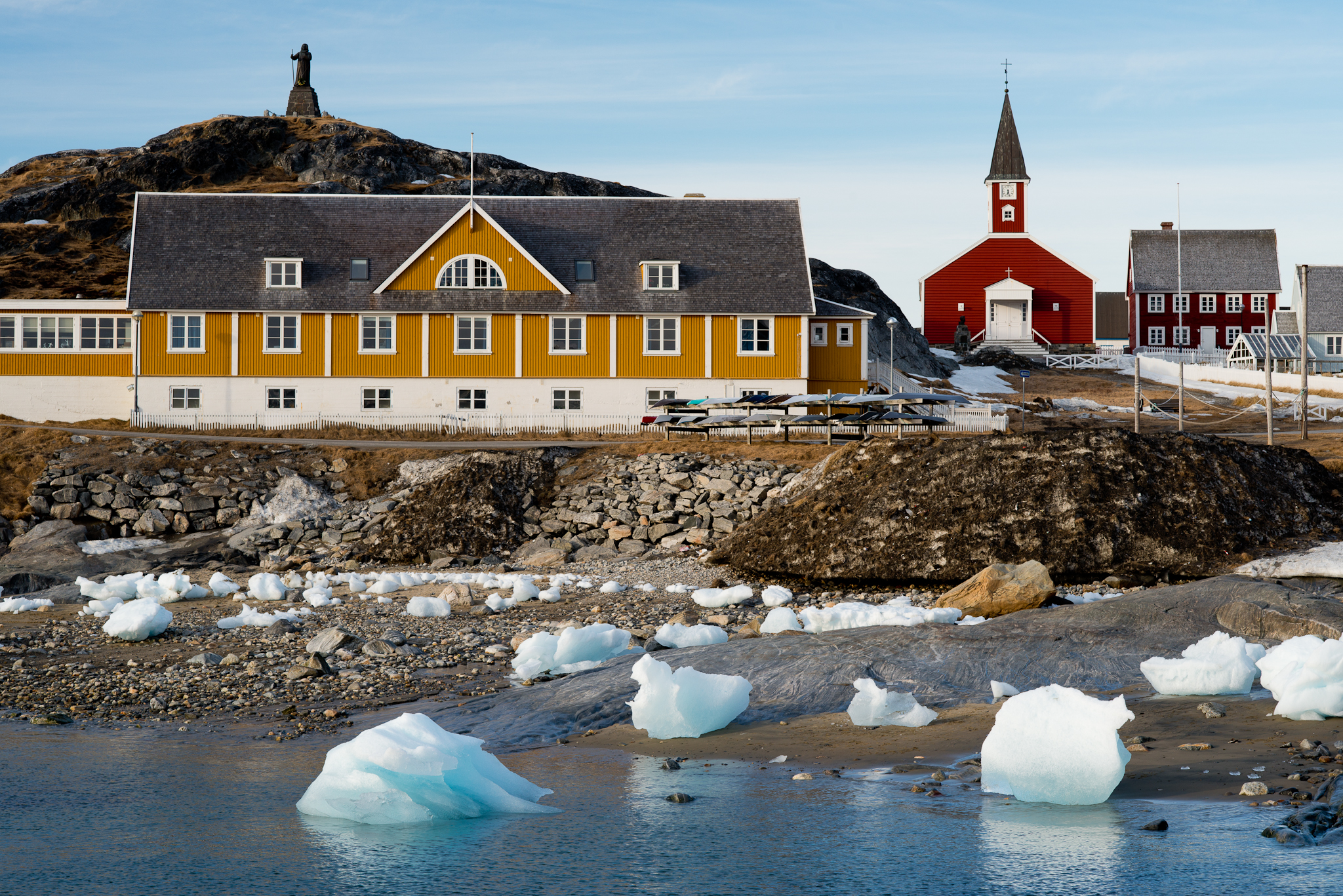
View of Nuuk with the statue of Hans Egede visible in the background atop a hill
