= Sedna (mythology) =

Inuit water deity

- Goddess of the sea and marine animals
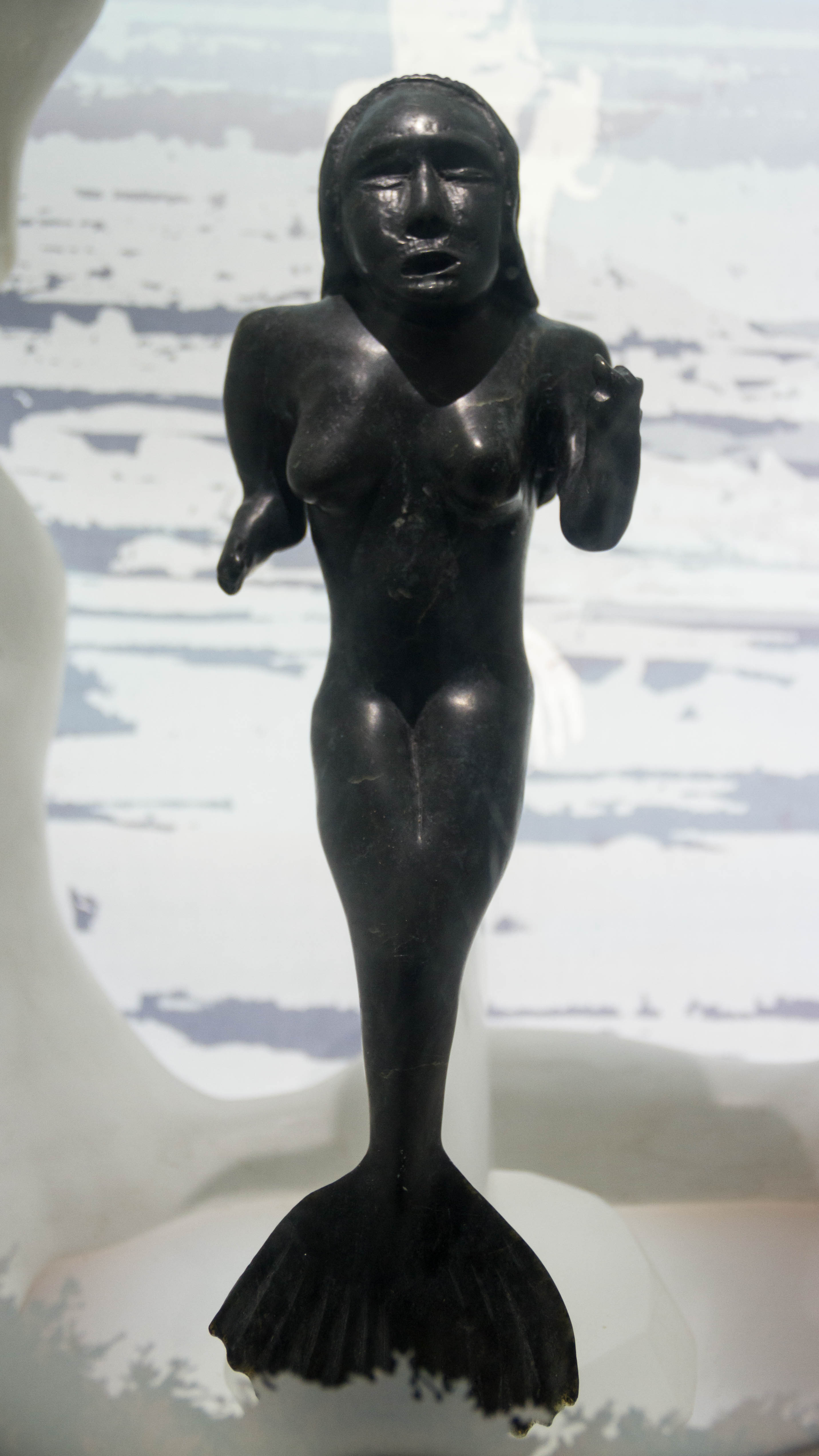
- Sedna sculpted by Nuvualiak Alariak

Sedna (Inuktitut: ᓴᓐᓇ, romanized: Sanna, previously Sedna or Sidne) is a goddess of the sea and marine animals in Inuit religion, also known as the Mother of the Sea or Mistress of the Sea, and several other names depending on region and dialect. The story of Sedna, which is a creation myth, describes how she came to rule over Adlivun, the equivalent of the underworld in Inuit religion.

== Names ==
She is known by a variety of names across different Inuit communities. Most of her names are avoidance speech workarounds, due to a custom of avoiding the proper name of one fearful or deserving of respect.

- Sanna (ᓴᓐᓇ) meaning "the great one down below". Sedna is an older spelling. (southern and southeastern Baffin Island)
- Nuliajuk or Nuliajuq (ᓄᓕᐊᔪᒃ) meaning "the great wife" (Aivilik, Netsilik,)
- Takannaaluk (ᑕᑲᓐᓈᓗᒃ) (old spelling Takánâluk) or Takannaaluk arnaaluk meaning "the terrible woman down there" (Igloolik)
- Kannaaluk meaning "the great woman down below" (Igloolik)
- Arnaqquaksaq (also spelled Arnakuagsak or Arnaqquassaaq) in parts of Greenland
- Uinigumasuittuq meaning "the one who did not want to marry"
- Nerrivik
- Taliilajuuq
- Sassuma Arnaa ('Mother of the Deep') in West Greenlandic
- Arnapkapfaaluk ('Big Bad Woman' or 'Sea Mother') of the Copper Inuit from the Coronation Gulf area
- 'Old-woman-who-lived-in-the-sea' (Killiniq Island, Labrador)

Outside of Inuit languages, Sedna has become the commonly used name due to being popularized by Franz Boas.

== Myth ==
=== Unwilling to marry ===
A young woman is reluctant to marry any of her human suitors, and instead ends up marrying either a dog or a bird, or both in succession.

==== Marrying a dog ====
This story is found among the Iglulingmiut (Iglulik) and Netsilik. This story sometimes also appears as a backstory for the Adlet.

There was a young woman who either refused to marry out of pickiness or her father refused to let her marry. The father angrily shouted that she would instead marry a dog. Shortly after, a strange man wearing a dog-tooth amulet arrived at their house. This was the father's dog shapeshifting. He stayed the night, laid with the daughter, and she became pregnant. When she was about to give birth, the father rowed his daughter to an island and left her there. She gave birth to a litter. The dog-father sometimes brought his family meat on the island. The litter was a mix of puppies and human babies. The dog-babies became the ancestors of white people, and the human-babies the ancestors of the Chipewyan, or other southern First Nations people.

==== Marrying a bird ====
This story is found among the Iglulingmiut (Iglulik) and Central Inuit.

A young woman marries a bird (who like the dog, sometimes shapeshifts into a human), either a storm petrel or a fulmar. She is unhappy in her marriage, either because she was abducted by her husband or because she married him because he promised her a nicer home than he actually had. When her father visits this daughter, she runs away, going back with her father in his boat. She is pursued by the birds. From the flapping of their wings and perhaps magic, they conjure up a storm. Their boat is sinking and the father is afraid, so he tries to throw his daughter overboard, back to the birds pursuing them.

=== Cutting of fingers ===
How she arrives to this situation differs, but the central element of the story is that a girl is thrown overboard a boat. In the water, she clings to the gunwale of the boat while a person in the boat cuts off her fingers so that she will be unable to hold on and will drown. She sinks to the bottom of the sea and there becomes a powerful spirit, mistress of the sea and mother of sea beasts.

Her cut-off pieces of finger become sea mammals. In all versions, seals are among the animals. In some versions her fingers are sequentially cut off joint by joint, with each joint becoming a different animal, like bearded seals, walruses, and whales.

In the "marrying a bird" version of the story, her father throws his daughter overboard to appease the birds and the supernatural storm that is sinking their boat. In the Iglulik storyteller Oruto's version, the girl sinks to the bottom of the sea where she becomes a powerful spirit. Her father, overcome by sorrow, drowns himself at the water's edge and becomes a spirit as well.

In another version that involves only marrying the dog, the woman is about to leave the island where she has been raising her human-dog children, who will grow up to become white men. She puts her children in the boat, then tries to get in herself, but they throw her overboard, where she sinks to the bottom.

In the Netsilik storyteller Nâlungiaq's version, there is no backstory. The girl has no family in her community, and no one cares about her, and so she is simply thrown into the sea.

The Central Inuit version Franz Boas recounts branches off the "marrying a bird" version, but the father fools the birds into thinking the girl drowned. She has not, and once the birds and the storm are gone, her father pulls her back into the boat. He really has nearly-drowned her and cut her fingers off, though, and the girl now secretly hates her father. When they get home, she calls upon her dogs to gnaw off his feet and hands. The earth then swallows them up and they become spirits.

== Cultural practices ==
=== Interactions with angakkuit ===
The goddess is easily upset when people do not observe the proper taboos, and she makes sure hunters will have no success. She restrains the animals, hiding them under the dripping-basin of her qulliq, the traditional oil lamp.

When this happens, an angakkuq (shaman) does rituals to appease her. This involves travelling to her house under the sea to negotiate with her. Sometimes appeasing her involves brushing and braiding her hair, something she cannot do for herself without fingers.

All agree that the goddess lives in a house under the sea with many beasts. Different versions give different colourful renditions of her house. Nâlungiaq tells of a large black guard dog, Nuliajuk's sea scorpion husband, her mysterious co-wife Isarrataitsoq, and their adopted baby Ungâq, abducted from a human couple. Oruto tells of her once-husband dog serving as guard dog, her father Isarrataitsoq, now called Takánâlûp angutialua, lying on a bench and mercilessly punishing all who have transgressed rules.

=== Kakiniit ===
A sketch by Kaj Birket-Smith of Inuk woman Tûglik's tattoos during the Fifth Thule Expedition, 1921–24.

Traditional kakiniit (Inuit tattoos) often include lines across a woman's fingers, knuckles, or wrists, alluding to the story of where Sedna's fingers were cut. Some say Sedna denies access to the afterlife to women whose fingers were not tattooed.

== Depictions in art ==
While the story itself does not mention this, in art Sedna is usually depicted with the head and upper body of a woman and the tail of a marine mammal, similar to a mermaid.

=== Public commemorations ===
The Statue of the Mother of the Sea on the Nuuk waterfront near the Greenland National Museum depicts the Greenlandic legend of a angakkoq combing the goddess' hair to release animals and fish to hunters and anglers.

- In 1957, Jens Rosing produced a Greenlandic commemorative postage stamp depicting the Mother of the Sea. It was reprinted in 1961.
- Nuuk, Greenland has the Statue of the Mother of the Sea at the shore. It depicts the goddess with a angakkoq combing her hair, and a host of sea animals.
- In 2024 Canada issued a commemorative toonie coin depicting Nuliajuk surrounded by a walrus, two beluga whales, a seal, and an Arctic char. It was designed by Mary K. Okheena, Charlotte Karetak, Thomassie Mangiok, and Tegan Voisey.

=== Figurines ===
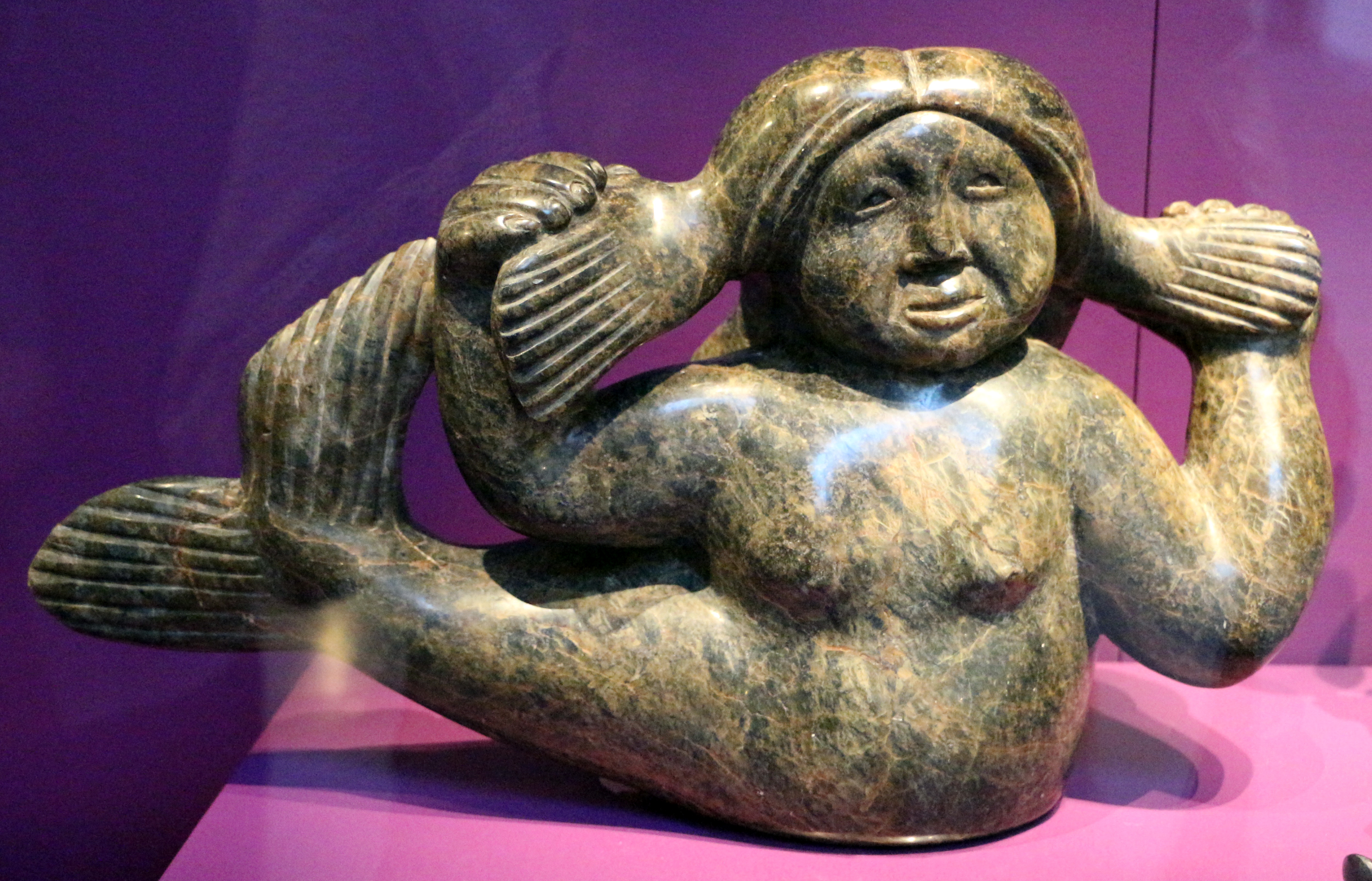
Sculpture of Sedna by Kaka Ashoona

- Pitseolak Niviaqsi carved Sedna many times throughout his career.
  - Pitseolak Niviaqsi (1994), Sedna (stone), Kinngait
  - Pitseolak Niviaqsi (2003), Sedna (stone), Kinngait
  - Pitseolak Niviaqsi (c. 2005), Sedna Holding her Braid (stone), Kinngait

=== Visual art ===
- Lucy Qinnuayuak (1982), Sedna with Spotted Bird (stonecut and stencil), Kinngait
- Ningiukulu Teevee (2010), Diving Sedna (stonecut and stencil), Kinngait
- Ningiukulu Teevee (2019), Sedna's Creation (stonecut), Kinngait

=== TV ===
- Nuliajuk: Mother of the Sea Beasts is a 2002 film and part two of the trilogy that started with Songs in Stone: An arctic journey home and ended with Diet of Souls. The film was directed by John Huston and produced by Aboriginal Peoples Television Network, Triad Film Productions, and VisionTV.
- In the 2025 TV show North of North, after falling off of a boat into the sea, an Inuk woman named Siaja Kudlak (Anna Lambe) has an underwater vision of Nuliajuk, played by Tanya Tagaq. From them on, Nuliajuk continues to appear to Siaja in visions when she is at her lowest moments.

== In astronomy ==
90377 Sedna, a trans-Neptunian object discovered by Michael Brown (California Institute of Technology (Caltech), Chad Trujillo (Gemini Observatory) and David Rabinowitz (Yale University) on November 14, 2003, is named after her.

== See also ==
- Selkie
