= Sofie Petersen =

Greenlandic bishop (born 1955)

The Right Reverend Sofie Petersen
- Bishop of Greenland
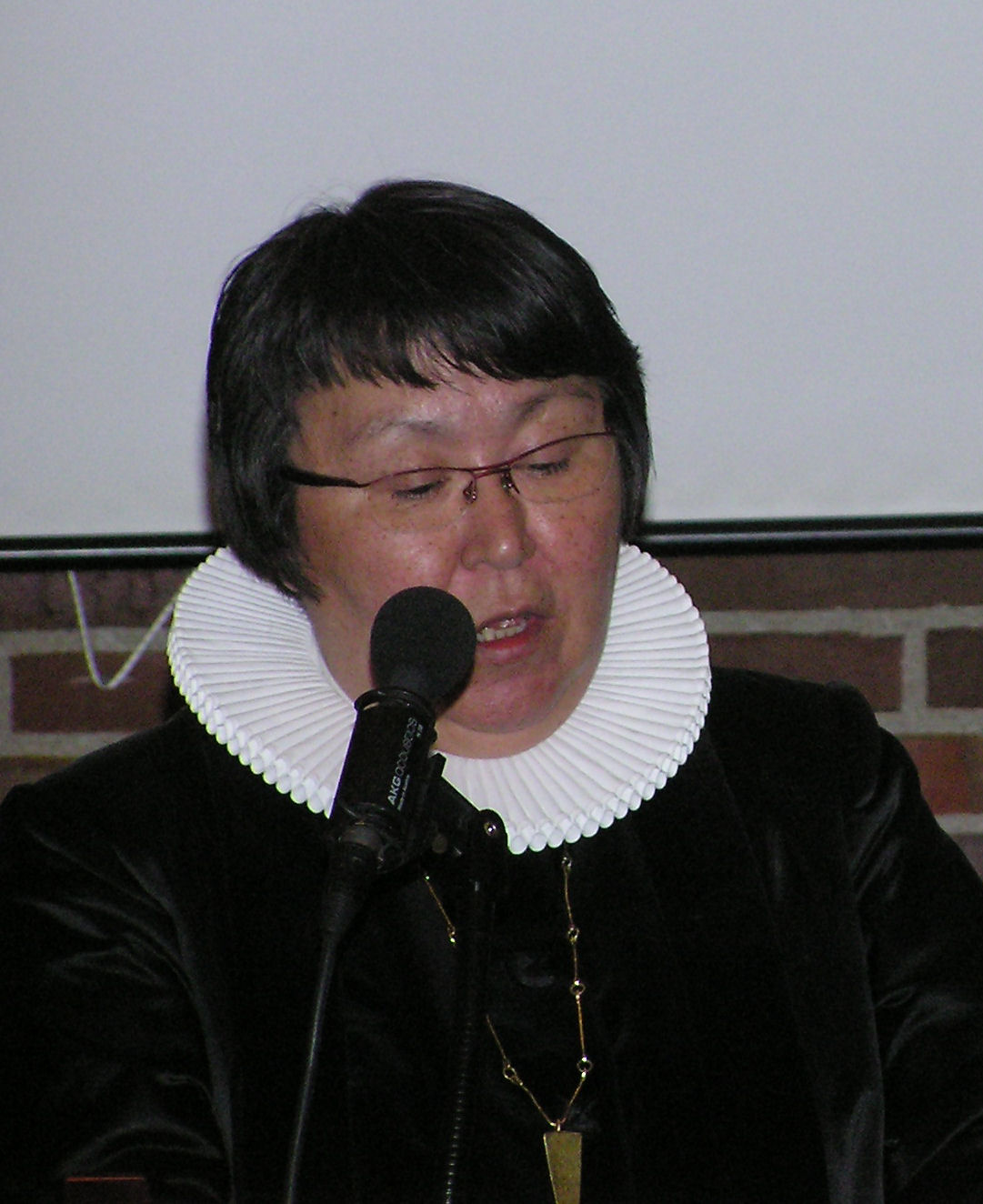
- Bishop Sofie Petersen
- Church: Church of Denmark
- Installed: 1995
- Term ended: 2020
- Predecessor: Kristian Mørch
- Successor: Paneeraq Siegstad Munk

Personal details
- Born: Sofie Bodil Louise Lisbeth Petersen; 23 November 1955 (age 70) Maniitsoq, Greenland, Kingdom of Denmark
- Denomination: Lutheranism
- Spouse: Christian Tidemand (m. 1976)
- Education: Theology
- Alma mater: University of Copenhagen, 1986
- Years active: 1987–2020
- Title: Bishop
- Website: www.groenlandsstift.dk

Sofie Petersen (born 23 November 1955) is a Greenlandic Lutheran bishop. She was Bishop of Greenland from 1995 to 2020.

== Early life and education ==
She was born on 23 November 1955 in Maniitsoq, Greenland. She studied theology and graduated from the University of Copenhagen in 1986. On 28 May 1995, at the age of 39, Petersen was ordained as the Bishop of Greenland in the Evangelical Lutheran Church in Denmark.

== Ministry ==
She was ordained at Hans Egede Church, the cathedral of Greenland, in the presence of Queen Margrethe II. She was the second woman to become a bishop in the Danish Lutheran church, and its second Inuk bishop.

Petersen is an outspoken advocate for climate justice. She worked closely with the Greenland's government to ensure the law would allow same-sex couples to marry in churches and other religious buildings. She retired in December 2020.
