= Paneeraq Siegstad Munk =

Greenlandic bishop

The Right Reverend Paneeraq Siegstad Munk
- Bishop of Greenland
- Church: Church of Denmark
- Diocese: Greenland
- Elected: October 2020
- Installed: 1 December 2020
- Predecessor: Sofie Petersen

Orders
- Ordination: 22 February 2004 by Sofie Petersen
- Consecration: 10 October 2021 by Sofie Petersen

Personal details
- Born: Paneeraq Hansine Judithe Karen Siegstad; 30 January 1977 (age 49) Attu, Greenland
- Denomination: Lutheranism
- Spouse: Arne Frigaard Munk (m. 2007)
- Children: 2
- Education: Theology
- Alma mater: University of Greenland; University of Copenhagen

Paneeraq Siegstad Munk (born 30 January 1977) is the current Bishop of Greenland for the Evangelical Lutheran Church. She was elected as bishop in 2020, and officially sworn in the next year.

== Early life ==
Paneeraq Siegstad Munk was born on 30th of January 1977 in Attu, Greenland.

== Career ==
In 2001, Munk earned a bachelor's degree in theology from the University of Greenland. Three years later, she was ordained as a priest for the Evangelical Lutheran Church (Church of Denmark). As a priest, she served the towns of Ittoqqortoormiit and Aasiaat. She also oversaw the Greenland Clergy Association. In 2017, she completed her master's degree in theology, and became a provost in Kujataa.

In 2020, she defeated three other candidates to become the bishop of Greenland, taking office on 1 December 2021. Allegations arose after her election that she had committed academic misconduct in relation to her bachelor's thesis—specifically that she cheated—but she and personnel from the university denied this. She replaced Sofie Petersen, who had served as bishop for the previous 25 years (1995–2020), and is the third bishop of Greenland overall. Due to the COVID-19 pandemic, her official swearing in was delayed until 2021, which coincided with the 300th anniversary of Hans Egede bringing Lutheranism to the island. She took her oath in October, and Queen Margrethe II and other bishops (including Marianne Gaarden, Jogvan Fridriksson, and Henrik Stubkjær) attended the ceremony. Her predecessor ordained her, and she took office on 1 December 2021.

She said that the Greenlandic language is an important element of the church, and that the interest of Margrethe II in the religious participation of the island was meaningful to its members.
