= Church of Denmark =

State-supported Lutheran church

Evangelical-Lutheran Church in Denmark
- Folkekirken
- Type: Established church
- Classification: Protestant
- Orientation: Lutheran
- Scripture: Protestant Bible
- Theology: High church Lutheran
- Polity: Episcopal
- Supreme Authority: Frederik X of Denmark and the Folketing
- Minister for Ecclesiastical Affairs: Ida Auken
- Primate: Peter Skov-Jakobsen
- Dioceses: 11
- Parishes: 2,163 (November 2019)
- Associations: Lutheran World Federation; World Council of Churches; Conference of European Churches; Porvoo Communion; Communion of Protestant Churches in Europe
- Region: Kingdom of Denmark (including Greenland, excluding Faroe Islands)
- Language: Danish
- Origin: 1536; 490 years ago
- Separated from: Catholic Church in Denmark
- Separations: Church of Iceland; Church of the Faroe Islands
- Members: 4,217,476 (70%, January 2026)
- Places of worship: 2,354 (2014)
- Aid organization: Folkekirkens Nødhjælp (ACT Alliance Denmark)
- Official website: Official website (in Danish); Official website (in English)

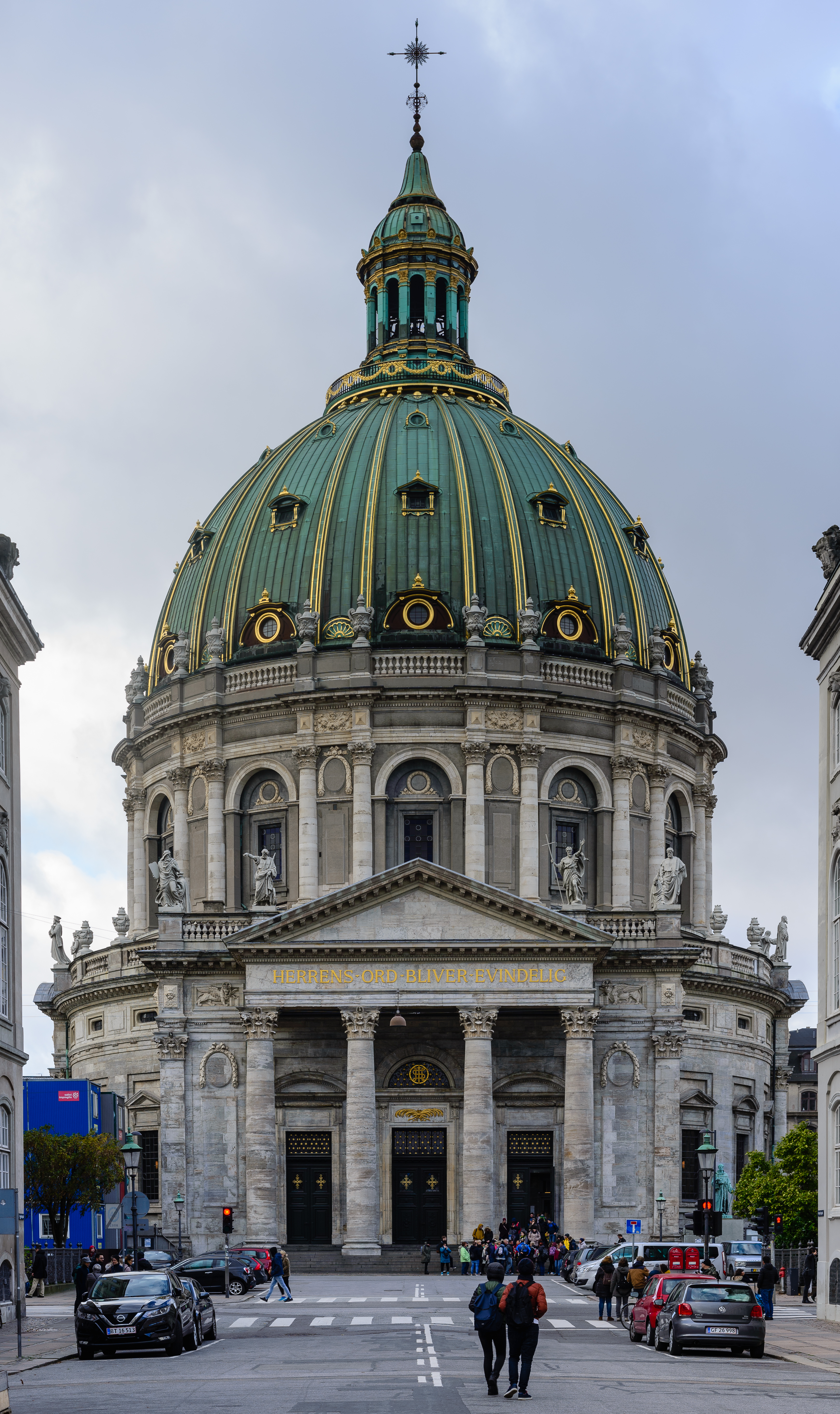
The Marble Church is an iconic landmark in Copenhagen

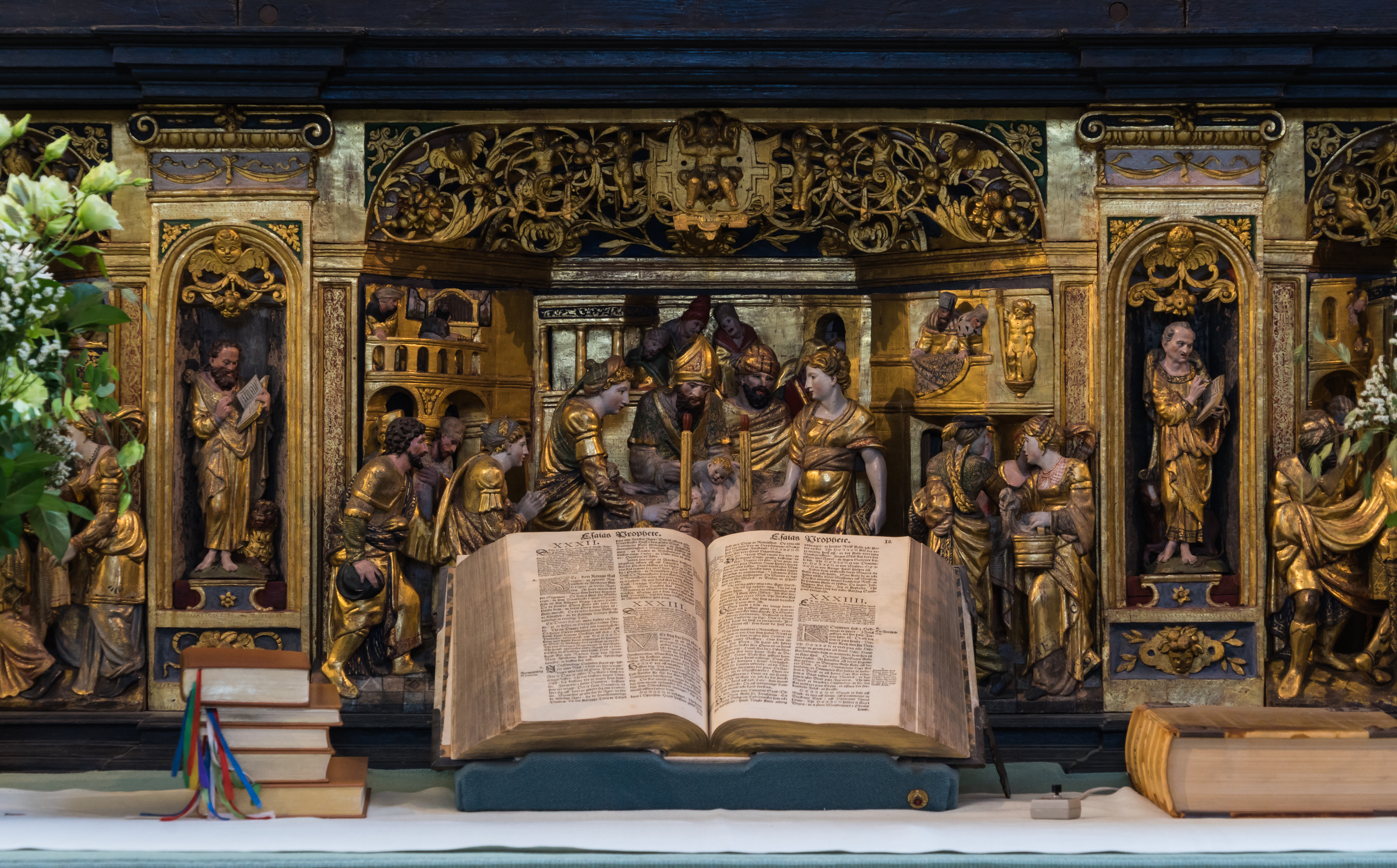
The Bible, main altar of Roskilde Cathedral

The Evangelical-Lutheran Church in Denmark or National Church (Danish: Folkekirken lit. 'the People's Church', or unofficially den danske folkekirke, 'the Danish People's Church'; Greenlandic: Ilagiit lit. 'the Congregation'), sometimes called the Church of Denmark, is the established, state-supported church in Denmark. The supreme secular authority of the church is composed of the reigning monarch and Denmark's Parliament, the Folketing. As of 2026, 70% of the population of Denmark are members, though membership is voluntary.

Christianity was introduced to Denmark in the 9th century by Ansgar, Archbishop of Hamburg-Bremen. In the 10th century, King Harald Bluetooth became Christian and began organizing the church, and by the 11th century, the country was fully Christianized. Since the Reformation in Denmark, the church has been Lutheran, while retaining much of its high church pre-Reformation liturgical traditions.

The 1849 Constitution of Denmark designated the church "the Danish people's church" and mandated that the state support it as such.

The Church of Denmark continues to maintain the historical episcopate. Theological authority is vested in bishops: ten bishops in mainland Denmark and one in Greenland, each overseeing a diocese. The bishop of Copenhagen is primus inter pares.

== Organization ==
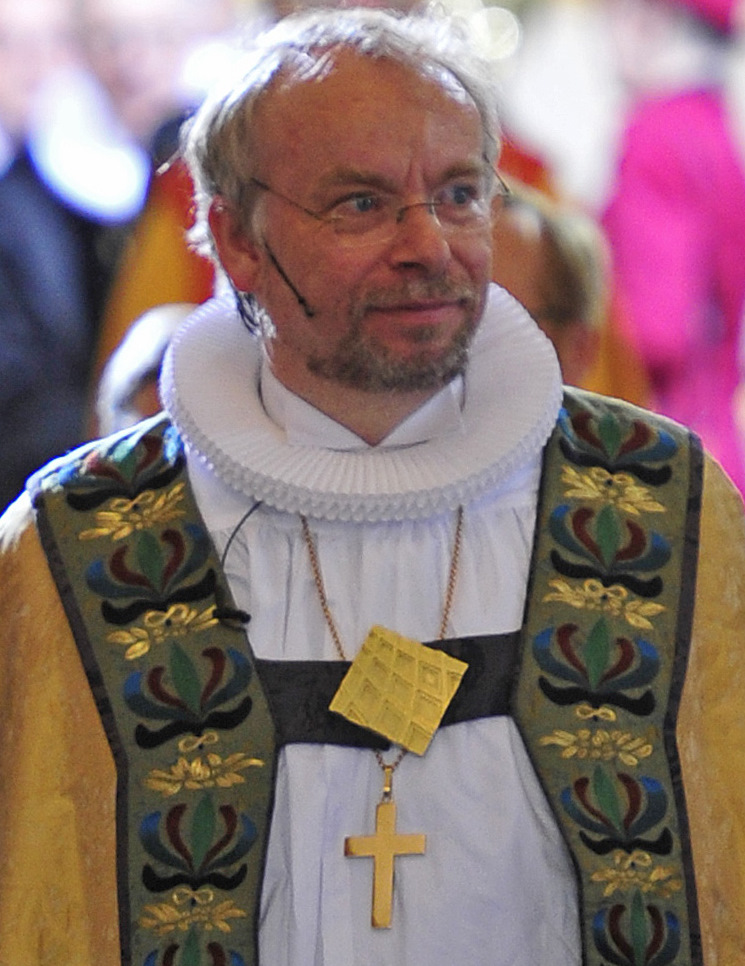
Peter Skov-Jakobsen, current Bishop of Copenhagen since 2009

=== Dioceses ===
The Church of Denmark is organized into eleven dioceses, each led by a bishop, including one for Greenland (the Faroe Islands was a twelfth diocese until 29 July 2007). The most senior bishop (primus inter pares) is the bishop of Copenhagen, currently Peter Skov-Jakobsen. The further subdivision includes 111 deaneries and 2,200 parishes. There are about 2,400 ordained pastors (Danish: præst).

Diocese	Founded	Cathedral	Incumbent
Diocese of Aalborg	1554	Aalborg Cathedral	Bishop Thomas Reinholdt Rasmussen (2021– )
Diocese of Aarhus	948	Aarhus Cathedral	Bishop Henrik Wigh-Poulsen (2015– )
Diocese of Copenhagen	1922	Copenhagen Cathedral	Bishop Peter Skov-Jakobsen (2009– ) (Primate of Denmark)
Diocese of Funen	988	St. Canute's Cathedral	Bishop Mads Davidsen (2023– )
Diocese of Haderslev	1922	Haderslev Cathedral	Bishop Marianne Christiansen (2013– )
Diocese of Helsingør	1961	Helsingør Cathedral	Bishop Peter Birch (2021– )
Diocese of Lolland–Falster	1803	Maribo Cathedral	Bishop Marianne Gaarden (2017– )
Diocese of Ribe	948	Ribe Cathedral	Bishop Elof Westergaard (2014– )
Diocese of Roskilde	1922	Roskilde Cathedral	Bishop Ulla Thorbjørn Hansen (2022– )
Diocese of Viborg	1537	Viborg Cathedral	Bishop Henrik Stubkjær (2014– )
Diocese of Greenland	1993	Nuuk Cathedral	Bishop Paneeraq Siegstad Munk (2020– )

=== Parishes ===
Each parish has a parochial council, elected by church members in four-year terms. The parochial council leads the practical business of the local church and decides employment of personnel, including the pastors, musicians, verger, and sacristan. The pastor (Danish: præst) is subordinate to the council, except in spiritual matters such as conducting church services and pastoral care. Parishes in the same local area are grouped into deaneries, with one priest serving as Rural Dean. Deaneries, parochial councils, and pastors are all subordinate to the bishop of the diocese.

==== Voluntary congregations ====
A special feature is the possibility of creating voluntary congregations (valgmenighed) within the Church. These account for a few percent of church members. They are voluntary associations, electing their own parochial council and parish pastor, whom they agree to pay from their own pockets. In return, they are exempt from church tax. The voluntary congregation and its pastor are subordinate to the bishop of the diocese, and members remain full members of the Church. Historically, when a parish was dominated by a conservative majority and priest, the liberal minority would often set up a voluntary congregation with their own priest – and vice versa. Today the voluntary congregations are often a solution for people who find the idea of a free church appealing, but wish to keep some bonds to the church.

==== Parish optionality ====
Another, less commonly used feature is parish optionality (sognebåndsløsning, literally "parish bond release"). If a Church member is dissatisfied with the particular pastor of his residence parish, he may choose to be served by another pastor who matches better with his Christian views.

=== Monasteries and convents ===
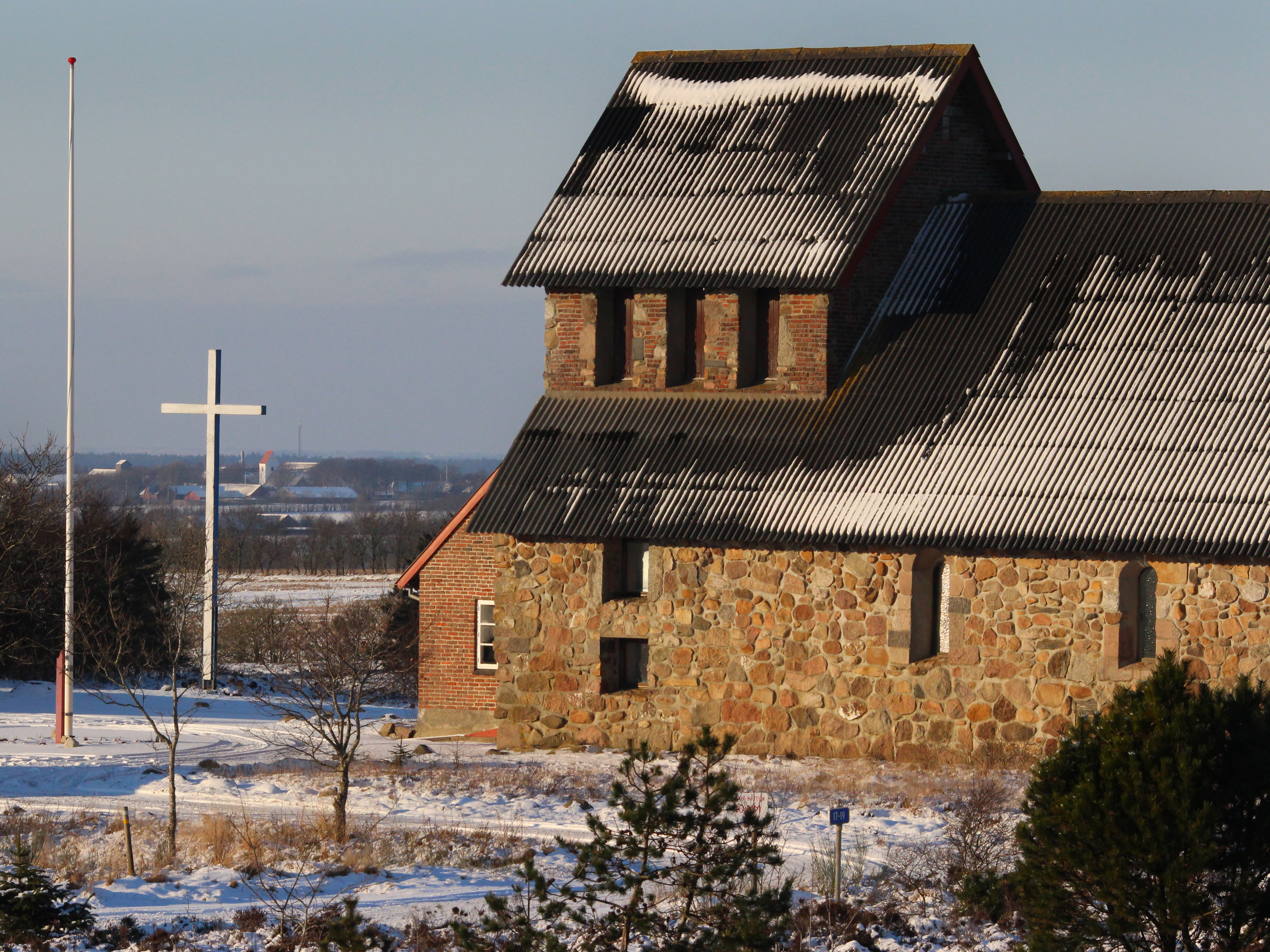
Hellig Kors Kloster (Holy Cross Monastery), an Evangelical-Lutheran abbey in Lem, Denmark

Evangelical-Lutherans interested in Christian monastic life are able to join monasteries and convents in Denmark, including Hellig Kors Kloster (Holy Cross Monastery), as well as nunneries belonging to the Daughters of Mary.

=== Membership ===
Church of Denmark
year	population	members	percentage	change annually
1984	5,113,500	4,684,060	91.6%	
1990	5,135,409	4,584,450	89.3%	0.4 ▼
2000	5,330,500	4,536,422	85.1%	0.4 ▼
2010	5,534,738	4,479,214	80.9%	0.6 ▼
2020	5,822,763	4,327,018	74.3%	0.4 ▼
2021	5,840,045	4,311,333	73.8%	0.5 ▼
2022	5,873,420	4,296,800	73.2%	0.6 ▼
2023	5,932,654	4,276,271	72.1%	1.1 ▼
2024	5,961,249	4,253,575	71.4%	0.7 ▼
2025	5,992,734	4,234,315	70.7%	0.7 ▼
2026	6,025,603	4,217,476	70.0%	0.7 ▼

Statistical data: 1984, 1990–2026, Source: Kirkeministeriet

According to official statistics from January 2026, 70% of the inhabitants of Denmark are members of the Church of Denmark, 0.7 percentage points less than the previous year. Membership rates vary from 52.5% in the Diocese of Copenhagen to 80.7% in the Diocese of Viborg. In recent decades, the percentage of Danes that are members of the church has been slowly declining, the most important reasons being immigration from non-Lutheran countries, withdrawal of some members, and a somewhat lower rate (56.2%) of Danish infants being christened.

Any person who is baptized (usually infant baptism) into the Church of Denmark automatically becomes a member. Members may renounce their membership and later return if they wish. Excommunication is legally possible but a rare occurrence. Examples include declared Satanists. A church member supporting reincarnation was excommunicated, but the Supreme Court overturned the excommunication in 2005.

=== Faith and church attendance ===
According to the latest inquiry about 2.4% of church members attend services every week, although on Christmas Eve more than a third of the population attends. The church is still widely used for traditional family ceremonies including christenings and confirmations. In the year 2022, 31.2% of weddings and 80.7% funerals were performed in the Church of Denmark, and 66.5% of children in grade 7–8 were confirmed. The level of weekly church attendance is similar to that in Norway and Sweden.

According to a 2009 poll, 25% of Danes believed Jesus is the Son of God, and 18% believed he is the Redeemer.

== Doctrine ==
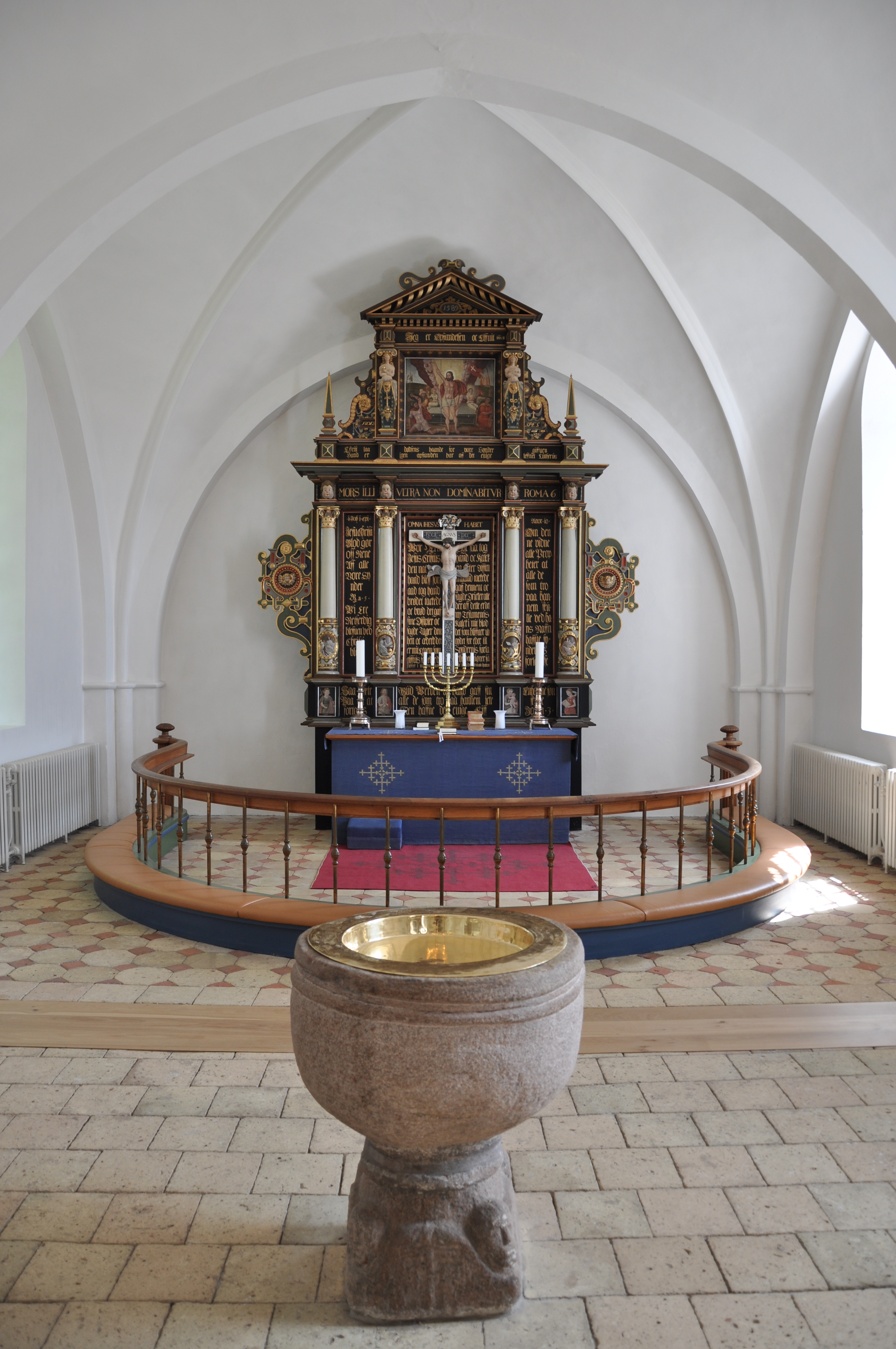
Altar and baptismal font in Besser Church, Samsø

The church is aimed at having a wide acceptance of theological views, as long as they agree with the official symbolic books as stipulated in the Danish Code of 1683. These are:

- The Apostles' Creed
- The Nicene Creed
- The Athanasian Creed
- The Augsburg Confession
- Luther's Small Catechism

Revised versions of the Old and New Testament were authorized by Queen Margrethe II in 1992. A revised Hymn Book was authorized in 2002.

Historically, there is a contrast between a liberal current inspired by N. F. S. Grundtvig and more strict, pietist or Bible fundamentalist movements (such as Indre Mission). These tensions have sometimes threatened to divide the Church. Tidehverv is a minor fraction based on a strict Lutheranism and antimodern, national-conservative views.

The Church of Denmark is a member of the World Council of Churches, the Lutheran World Federation, the Communion of Protestant Churches in Europe and the Porvoo Communion.

=== Liturgy ===
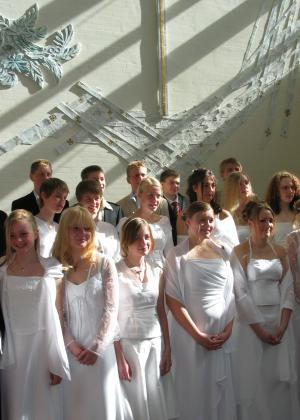
Children preparing to be confirmed

The Communion Service includes three readings from the Bible: a chapter from one of the Gospels, from one of the Epistles or another part of the New Testament and, since 1992, from the Old Testament. Texts are picked from an official list following the church year. Some liturgical features have a fixed content but are free to the form. This accounts for the Common Prayer following the sermon, where the priest is encouraged to mention the royal house. Some will simply mention "the King and all his House" whereas others will list all members of the royal house by name and title.

The sermon, as in other Protestant churches, is a central part of the service. The priest takes a starting point in the text of that Sunday, but is free to form a personal message of it. Hymns are also very central. In contrast to Roman Catholic churches, Danish congregations sit while singing and stand while listening to the Bible.

The Church of Denmark recognizes two sacraments: baptism and the Lord's Supper, as well as four other rites. Formerly, individual or shared confession was a condition to receive the Lord's Supper. An official confession ritual still exists, but is used on a particular basis, as requested. There are also official rituals for confirmation, wedding, holy orders, anointing of the sick and funerals. Emergency baptism may be performed by any Christian if necessary, and later the child will then be "ratified" in Church.

== Church and state ==
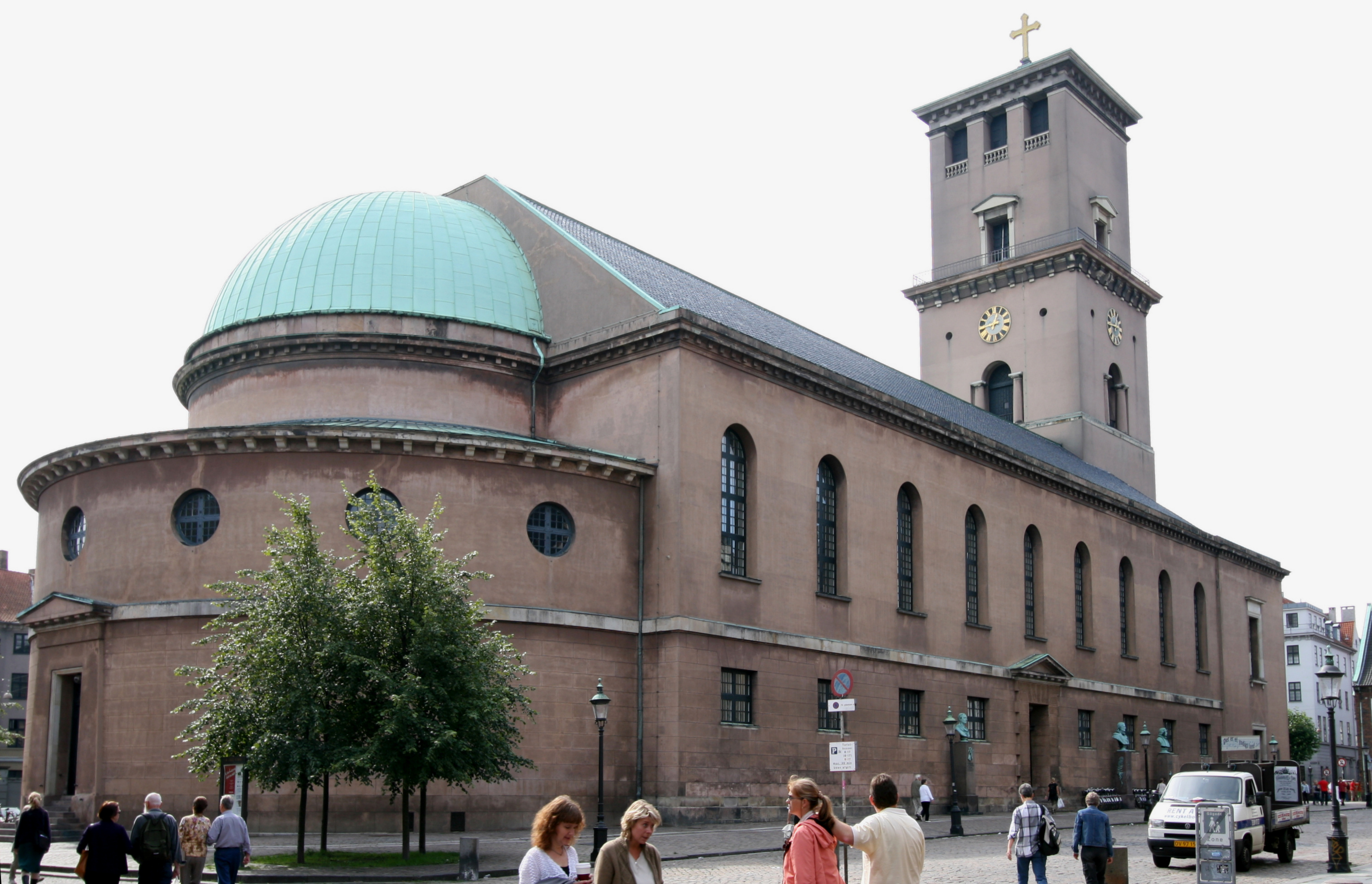
The Church of Our Lady, the cathedral of Copenhagen and the National Cathedral of Denmark

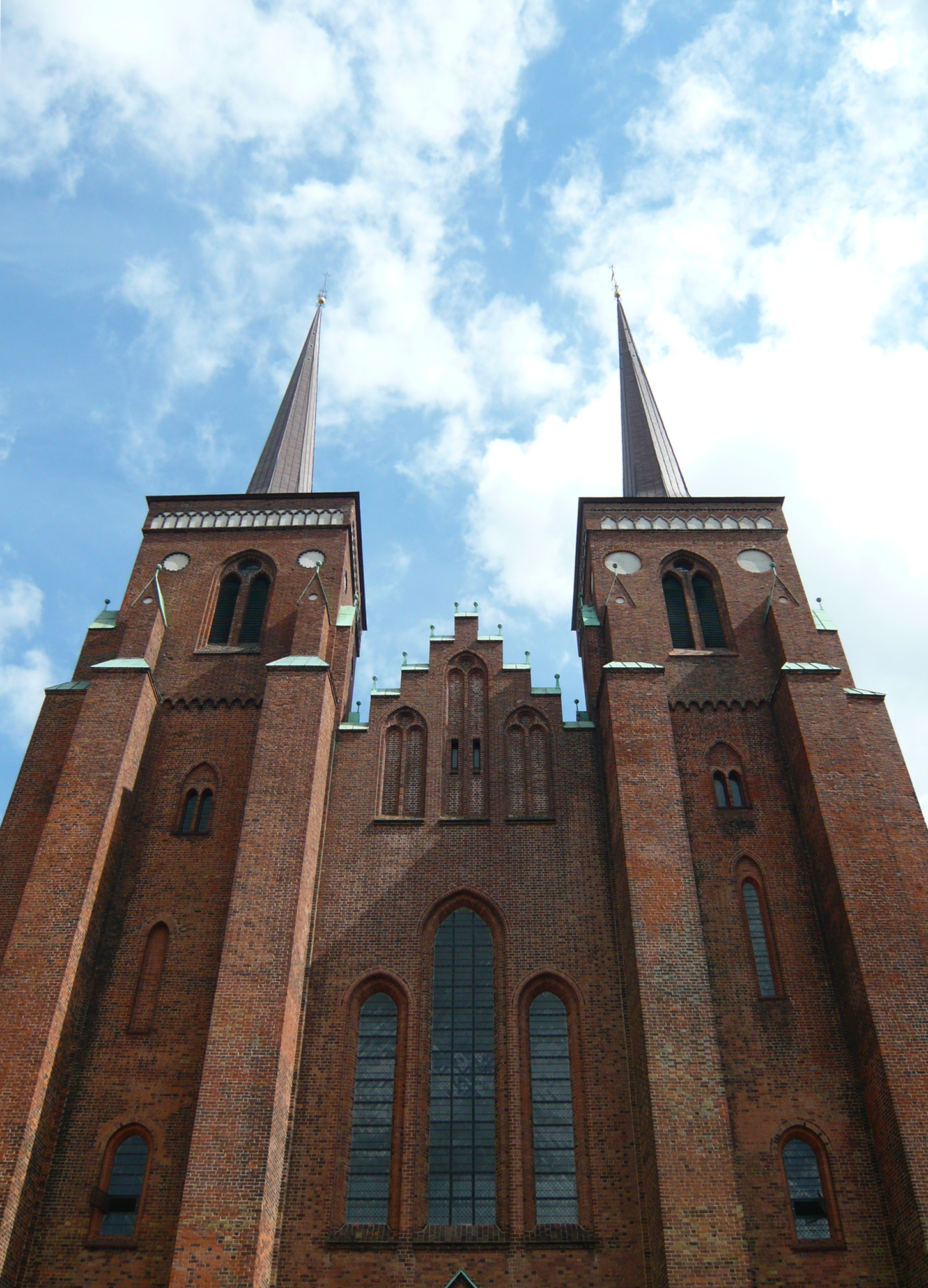
Roskilde Cathedral has been the burial place of Danish royalty since the 15th century. In 1995 it became a World Heritage Site.

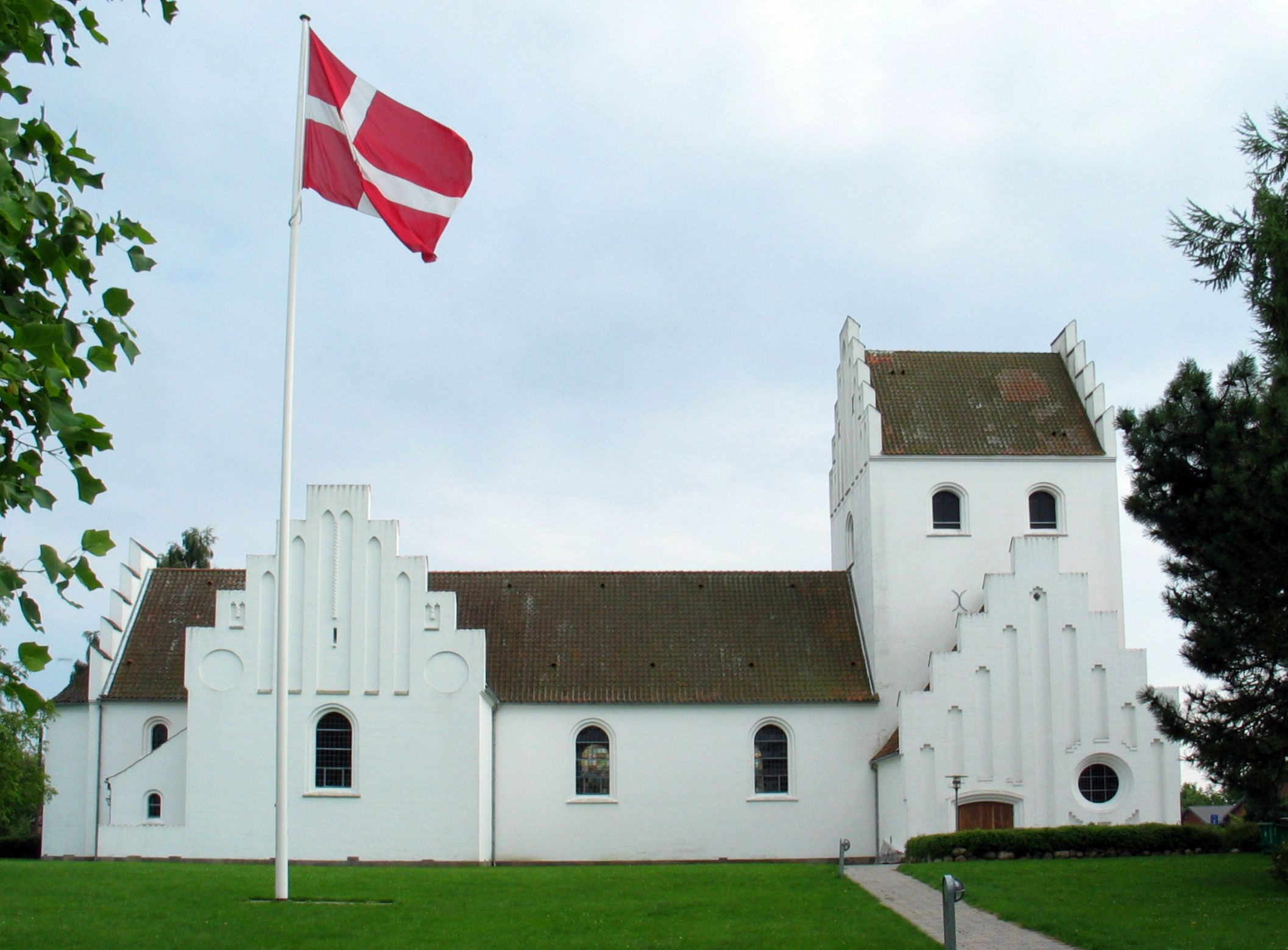
A historical picture of the parish church in Holte

As supreme authority of the Church of Denmark, the monarch must be a member (article 6 of the Constitution). This applies to the royal princes and princesses as well, but does not apply to their spouses. Traditionally, though, every foreigner who has become a member of the royal family has converted or become a member of the church; as a result, the Prince Consort Henrik converted to Evangelical-Lutheranism from Catholicism and Mary Donaldson also converted from Presbyterianism to Evangelical-Lutheranism.

=== Freedom of religion ===
With the Reformation in Denmark in 1536, Lutheran Christianity was established as the state religion. For the next century, in a time when religious wars swept Europe, persecution of other faiths followed (Lutheran orthodoxy). Exceptions were granted only to foreign diplomats. For at least a period in the 16th century, small circles of clandestine Catholicism prevailed. From the second half of the 17th century, Roman Catholic, Reformed and Jewish congregations were allowed in the new town of Fredericia. Non-Lutherans were also allowed in Friedrichstadt and on Nordstrand in Slesvig. With the constitution of 1849, freedom of religion was introduced in Denmark, but Lutheranism remained the state church.

==== Recognized and approved religions ====
A religious community does not need any state approval in order to enjoy the freedom of religion granted by the constitution. However, state-approved congregations (godkendte trossamfund) enjoy several privileges. They may conduct legal weddings, establish own cemeteries, get residence permits for foreign priests, are exempt from corporate and property tax, may apply for means from the state lottery fund, and members may tax-deduct membership fees and presents to the congregation.

Before changes introduced under the Religious Communities Act, religious communities recognized before 1970 had additional civil-registration privileges, including the ability to issue birth, baptismal, and marriage certificates. These privileges were extended to all recognized religious communities from 2023.

This legal distinction between "recognized" and "approved" communities remains, but is mainly a historical one. Communities recognized before 1970 includes only eight well-established Christian communities as well as one Jewish community. From 1970 until the 1990s only a few more Christian congregations were approved, but since 1998, a much more liberal practice has ensued. Since then, a board of independent experts decide about approval of new religious communities. The board includes professors of law, religious studies and theology. It merely investigates whether the organization fulfills basic definitions, such as having a doctrine, creed and cult, in order to be called a congregation of faith. In 2003, the approval of the Forn Siðr religion caused some public debate.

=== Lack of central authority ===
The Church is in practice barred from having official positions in political or other matters, since it has no central bodies that could define such stances: neither a spiritual leader (such as an archbishop) nor a central assembly or synod. Bishops have the last say on doctrinal questions within their respective dioceses. The King (in practice the Minister of Ecclesiastical Affairs) and Parliament are the central bodies, but they usually keep to administrative matters and abstain from interfering with spiritual questions. Church laws are rarely changed, and, when it happens, only administrative matters are affected.

Firstly, these principles are generally believed to ensure a nonsectarian, tolerant church where parishioners and priests enjoy a high degree of freedom to practice their own interpretation of Lutheran Christianity. Secondly, many Danish politicians and theologians claim that only this church-state-model will ensure the division of politics and religion, since the Church cannot interfere with political matters or even claim to speak with one voice on behalf of its members. They frequently discourage the term state church and argue it is, as its name states, the "people's church".

Article 66 of the Danish Constitution stipulates a church ordinance shall be laid down by law. This promissory clause dates back from the first Constitution of 1849 but was never put into practice. It was feared that splits could occur if a central authority were created.

In very few cases have politicians deviated from their traditional hands-off course in church doctrinal matters. Where they have done so, it has been with the declared aim of preventing a possible split in the church. See the issues of Female clergy and Same-sex marriage below.

=== Civil registration ===
The Church of Denmark conducts civil registration of births, deaths, change of name etc. (vital records). The keeping of such kirkebøger ("church books") is a centuries-long tradition, dating from when the parish rectors were the only government representatives in rural areas. In 2002–03 the traditional church records were replaced by a new national electronic registration system called Personregistrering. After protests in 2005, the Minister for Education and Ecclesiastical Affairs Bertel Haarder announced that people who for various reasons did not want to send their registration forms (e.g. births and namings) to the local church office could now send their forms to a central office located in Nykøbing Falster.

In 2010 parents' duty to report the birth of their child was abolished. Instead, it was decided that in the future it was the task of the midwives to report all births in Denmark (only when a midwife is not present at the birth of a child are the parents still obliged to report the birth of the child).

=== Economic support ===
Article 4 in the Constitution of Denmark stipulates that "The Evangelical Lutheran Church shall be the Established Church of Denmark, as such, it shall be supported by the State." On the other hand, article 68 ensures that citizens are not obliged to pay personal contributions to any religion other than their own. Non-members do not pay church tax, but an additional state subsidiary accounted for 12% of the Church's income in 2006. This means every citizen, even a non-member, contributes with an average of 151 kroner annually, as of 2022. In addition, the bishops are high-ranking officials whose salary is fully paid by the state. In return, certain public tasks are carried out by the Church, such as conducting vital records registries and managing graveyards which are open to all denominations.

=== State church ===
The Act of Succession specifies that monarch "shall be a member of the Evangelical Church." Furthermore, clergy "in the Church of Denmark are civil servants employed by the Ministry of Ecclesiastical Affairs" and the "economic base of the Church of Denmark is state-collected church taxes combined with a direct state subsidiary (12%), which symbolically covers the expenses of the Church of Denmark to run the civil registration and the burial system for all citizens."

The current arrangement of governmental support of the Church of Denmark as the state church is supported by most political parties. It has been challenged for decades by the left wing and by atheists; more recently also by some ideological liberals and some members of free churches.

Proponents for the current system argue that membership is voluntary, that the existence of a state church has ancient historical roots, and that the church fulfills certain administrate tasks for the state. Antidisestablishmentarians view patronage of the Church of Denmark as being consistent with Denmark's identity as a Christian state. They also argue it would be difficult to decide whether church-owned real estate should be handed over to the state or not. The former possessions of the Catholic Church were ceded to the Crown at the reformation in 1536. Proponents for a separation (disestablishment) argue the state church violates their concept of the equality of religions. Immigrant groups and the Muslim society are divided on the issue, as some think official Christianity is preferable to a purely secular state.

As of 2026, full legal equality between religious communities exists in only some Western European countries. Besides Denmark, the Faroe Islands, Greenland, Iceland and England have established or state churches, while Scotland has an officially recognized national church whose relationship with the state differs from that of the Church of England. Greece gives constitutional recognition to the Eastern Orthodox Church as the "prevailing religion", and Malta’s constitution identifies Roman Catholicism as the religion of Malta.

=== Similar Nordic Lutheran churches ===
- Church of Sweden – Svenska kyrkan
- Church of Norway – Den norske kirke
- National Church of Iceland – Þjóðkirkjan
- Evangelical Lutheran Church of Finland – Suomen evankelis-luterilainen kirkko (Swedish: Evangelisk-lutherska kyrkan i Finland)
- Church of the Faroe Islands – Fólkakirkjan
- Denominations in the Communion of Nordic Lutheran Dioceses, which are aligned with Confessional Lutheran praxis

== Controversial issues ==
=== Female clergy ===
The ordination of women, having been discussed within the church since the 1920s, has been allowed since 1948, despite some rather strong early resistance from the clergy. The then Minister of Ecclesiastical Affairs was contacted by a parochial council who wished to employ a female priest. He decided there was no legal obstacle to that. The first woman to become a bishop was instituted in 1995. As of 2021, a majority of priests are women.

Among a small conservative minority, resistance to women ordained as clergy remains. In 2007 the Bishop of Viborg, known as a moderate conservative, revealed that he had given special consideration to priests who were known to be against ordained women. He had organized ordination ceremonies in such a way that new priests who so wished could avoid shaking hands with, or receiving the laying on of hands from, women ordained as priests. According to the bishop, this had happened twice in the 100 ordinations he had performed. The matter became headline news amidst a debate about Muslim fundamentalists who refuse to shake hands with members of the opposite sex. The Minister for Education and Ecclesiastical Affairs, Bertel Haarder, said he would discuss the matter with the bishops, but also stated that tolerance for various views should be respected. In contrast, the Minister for Employment, Claus Hjort Frederiksen, thought that the priests in question should be dismissed, as public employees are obliged to shake hands with anyone.

=== Same-sex marriage ===
A 2011 poll of the Danish public found that 75.8% of Danes approve of same-sex marriages being performed in the church.

A 2011 survey asked 1921 priests, of which 1137 priests responded, for their opinion on same-sex marriage in the Church. It found that 62% of those who replied supported same-sex marriage in the Church on the same basis as for heterosexuals, while 28% were against. A map of the results hints at the traditional west–east division, with a conservative wing being dominant in central West Jutland (the former Ringkjøbing Amt) and on Bornholm, but liberal priests dominating in most other cities.

In 2004, a poll among pastors said 60% were against church marriage of same-sex couples.

==== Early position of the church ====
Since Denmark approved same-sex civil unions (registered partnership) in 1989, the question of church blessing ceremonies for such unions emerged. After an inquiry from the Danish National Association of Gays and Lesbians in 1993, bishops set up a commission to reach a stance on the matter.

An early stance on registered partnerships was reached in 1997. Bishops maintained that the ceremony of marriage was God's framework for the relation between a man and a woman, but this view of marriage was not affected by the fact that some people chose to live in a responsible community with a person of the same sex, approved by society, i.e. a registered partnership. The bishops disapproved of institutionalising new rituals, but couples who wished a nonritualized marking in church of their registered partnership should be obliged. In such cases, it would be up to the rector to decide, and he should seek advice from his bishop.

At this time, many churches chose to bless registered partnerships, however this blessing was distinguished from a legal ceremony, which was performed by a mayor or another municipal official.

==== Same-sex marriages accepted ====
On 15 June 2012 the Church of Denmark made the decision to perform same-sex marriage ceremonies and not merely bless them; therefore Denmark now recognizes same-sex marriages. In early 2012 Minister for Equality, Ecclesiastical Affairs and Nordic Cooperation, Manu Sareen introduced a bill approving same-sex marriage, which was passed in parliament in June 2012. A wedding ritual with liturgy has been developed and presented to parliament by the eleven bishops who are in favor of same-sex marriages being performed in church. Manu Sareen and a majority of bishops initially proposed the ritual would not declare the same-sex couple 'spouses', but 'life partners' (livsfæller, a Danish neologism), but the minister later changed his mind on this detail. Two conservative organizations within the church, Inner Mission and Lutheran Mission, as well as one of the twelve bishops, maintain their protests against same-sex marriage. It will be up to each individual priest to decide whether he or she will conduct marriages of same-sex couples. The first same-sex couple was married on Friday 15 June.

The process towards the official recognition of same sex marriage in the Church of Denmark began on February 8, 1973, when Provo Priest Harald Søbye performed a wedding of a male couple, although not legally recognized, on a suggestion from a journalist at the newspaper Ekstra Bladet, which announced it as "The World's First Gay Wedding". On February 25, 1973, Harald Søbye performed another wedding on a TV show. The state prosecutor investigated the cases, but concluded that the priest's use of his vestment was not illegal. Søbye had been retired in 1964 for political activism, but remained an ordained priest within the church. During the next 15 years, Søbye performed approximately 210 blessings or weddings of same-sex couples.

When Denmark introduced registered partnerships in 1989, the issue of same-sex marriage for some years received little attention. Church blessings of these partnerships slowly gained ground (see above). Later, the possibility of registered partnership, or same-sex marriage, performed by the church came under discussion. The issue was brought up in an unusual way by Prime Minister Anders Fogh Rasmussen in 2004, who said he would approve of such a change, although he claimed to speak as a private person on this issue, not as prime minister.

Views among proponents vary whether such a ceremony should be called 'marriage' or merely 'registered partnership' (registreret partnerskab), as the original same-sex civil union was called. In practice, clergy have been allowed to decide for themselves whether to perform same-sex marriages or not, similar to the right to deny remarriage of divorced persons (a policy employed by a conservative minority of priests).

==== Constitutionality ====
A further controversy is that this new practice may be against the Danish constitution; §4 of the constitution states: "The Evangelical Lutheran Church shall be the Established Church of Denmark, as such, it shall be supported by the State." §4 not only establishes "Folkekirken" as the state church, but also gives certain boundaries as to what the state church is. It is forced to follow the Lutheran doctrines and if, as some critics claim, the Lutheran doctrines explicitly state that homosexuality is a sin, then it is a violation of the constitution to allow gay marriages in the state church.

=== Gay clergy ===
Gay and lesbian clergy exist, and this is generally considered a strictly personal issue. Parish councils are central in selecting and employing new priests, including interviews with candidates. Once employed, parish priests are public servants and cannot be discharged except for neglect of duties, ultimately the bishop's decision.

In 2011 a female priest serving two small island parishes was fired after controversies with the parish council of Agersø She claimed to have been ousted because of her sexuality, but the parish council rejected this accusation and mentioned cooperation problems as the cause. Twenty years earlier she had come out as lesbian and a practitioner of sadomasochism in a Swedish TV show.

In 2009 a parish priest in Tingbjerg, a Copenhagen suburb, moved away from the parish to a secret address after assaults against his vicarage, his car and the parish church. The vicarage was put up for sale. According to Avisen.dk, local youths claimed they harassed him because he was openly homosexual, among other reasons. The priest himself denied this was the issue, but rather claimed the assaults were part of a general tendency therein which intensified after his public denunciation. A Sunday service held a few weeks later was attended by several prominent guests supporting the priest, including Prime Minister Lars Løkke Rasmussen, Minister for Education and Ecclesiastical Affairs Bertel Haarder, and photographer Jacob Holdt. Tingbjerg is a single-plan public housing area, marked by gang violence and youth crime, and the most criminal district of Copenhagen.

=== Rebuttal to Dominus Iesus ===
In 2000, the Church of Denmark's ecumenical department publicly criticized the Roman Catholic declaration Dominus Iesus, which controversially used the term "ecclesial community" to refer to Protestant denominations, including Lutheran churches. The Church of Denmark argued that there is a destructive effect on ecumenical relations if one church deprives another of the right to be called a Church and that it is just as destructive as if one Christian denies another Christian the right to be called a Christian.

== See also ==
- Danish Seamen's Church and Church Abroad
- Danish Church in Southern Schleswig
- Danish Evangelical Lutheran Church Association in America
- United Danish Evangelical Lutheran Church
- History of Denmark; for the history of the Church of Denmark
- Religion in Denmark
- Christianity in Denmark
- Catholic Church in Denmark
- Religion in the Faroe Islands
- Religion in Greenland

Other Nordic national Lutheran churches

- Church of the Faroe Islands
- Evangelical Lutheran Church of Finland
- Church of Iceland
- Church of Norway
- Church of Sweden
