= Angodic =

Ugandan cuisine

Angodic is a traditional food enjoyed by the Karamojong people in Karamoja sub-region of Northern Uganda. The local food is a traditional cuisine that consists of sour milk mixed with pounded sorghum and ghee, roasted and pounded groundnuts and once prepared, Angodic is preserved with a little bit of honey for up to one year. The traditional delicacy is consumed by cultural leaders and the Karamojong community.

== See also ==
- Alakena
- Nsenene
- Nangnang fish
