= Sun Moon =

Sun Moon may refer to:

- Abbreviation of Korean names with the surname Moon (문) and the generation name Sun (선, Seon):
  - Sun Myung Moon (1920–2012), founder of the Unification Church
  - Sun-hee Moon, South Korean voice actress
- Sun Moon Lake, Yuchi, Nantou, Taiwan, Republic of China
- Sun Moon, the 2023 movie directed by Sydney Tooley
- Sun Moon University, Cheonan, South Korea
- Pokémon Sun and Moon
- Donyi-Polo, a Tani-language term meaning "Sun-Moon"
  - Donyi-Polo (religious movement), religious movement among the Tani people of Arunachal Pradesh, India

== See also ==
- Sun and Moon (disambiguation)
- Sun and moon letters in Arabic and Maltese
