= Sun and Moon =

Sun and Moon (or, less commonly, Moon and Sun), The Sun and the Moon, or variants may refer to:

== Places ==
- The Sun and the Moon in classical astronomy and astrology, see classical planet
- Sun and Moon Bay, Hainan, China
- Sun Moon Lake, Yuchi Township, Nantou County, Taiwan

== Literature ==
- "Sun and Moon" (Mansfield), a 1920 short story by Katherine Mansfield
- The Moon and the Sun, a 1997 novel
- Sun & Moon (publisher), a Los Angeles publisher
- Brother and sister who became the Sun and Moon, Korean fairy tale
- Sun and Moon (Inuit myth), a traditional Inuit story

== Film and TV ==
- The Moon and the Sun (film), a 2022 film released as "The King's Daughter", originally scheduled for release in 2015 as "The Moon and the Sun"
- Moon Embracing the Sun, also known as The Sun and The Moon, a 2012 South Korean television drama series
- Pokémon the Series: Sun & Moon, the twentieth season of the Pokémon anime

== Music ==
- The Sun and the Moon, a British post-punk band fronted by Mark Burgess (musician)
- The Sun The Moon The Stars, an American metal band

=== Albums ===
- The Sun and the Moon (The Bravery album), an album by The Bravery
- The Sun and the Moon Complete, a remix album by The Bravery
- The Sun and the Moon (The Sun and the Moon album), an album by the band of the same name
- Earth and Sun and Moon, an album by Midnight Oil
- Earth, Sun, Moon, an album by Love and Rockets
- Sun and Moon, an album by Sam Kim
- Sun and Moon, an album by Phil Chang

=== Songs ===
- "East of the Sun (and West of the Moon)", a jazz standard
- "Sun & Moon (Above & Beyond song)", a progressive house track by Above & Beyond featuring Richard Bedford
- "Sun & Moon", by NCT 127 from Cherry Bomb (EP)
- "The Sun and the Moon", by The Corrs from Jupiter Calling (album)
- "Sun & Moon", by Claude-Michel Schönberg and Alain Boublil from the musical Miss Saigon
- "Sun & Moon", by Two Steps from Hell from the album SkyWorld
- "Sun and Moon" (Anees song), by Anees

== Other ==
- Pokémon Sun and Moon, handheld video games for the Nintendo 3DS
- Wall of the Sun and Wall of the Moon, a pair of murals
- The Creation of the Sun, Moon and Vegetation, a painting by Michelangelo
- Yin and yang, a concept in Chinese philosophy, "yang" is the Sun, "yin" is the Moon

== See also ==
- Sun Moon (disambiguation)
- Union of the Sun and Moon
- Sun and Moon allegory
- Sun and moon letters in Arabic
- Moon (disambiguation)
- Sun (disambiguation)
