= The Brother and Sister Who Became the Sun and Moon =

Traditional Korean tale

"The Brother and Sister Who Became the Sun and Moon" (Korean: 해와 달이 된 오누이; RR: Haewa Dari Doen Onui) is a traditional Korean tale that explains the origins of the Sun and Moon. It is also called "The Reason Sorghum is Red". This fairy tale was featured in the Korean post stamp.

== Plot ==
A tiger catches and eats an old mother who was returning from work at a rich neighbor's house. The tiger then disguises itself in the mother's clothes. It goes to the mother's house, where her son and daughter live, and tells them to open the door. The older brother and younger sister look out through the hole in the door, and, quickly realizing their visitor is actually a tiger, escape through the back door and climb up onto a tree. The tiger begins to chase them, so the two climb further up the tree. Reaching the top, the siblings pray to the Sky God, who sends down an iron rope. Climbing the rope, the brother and sister became the Sun and the Moon, respectively. The tiger prays to the Sky God in a similar fashion and is given a weak rope. When the tiger tries climbing on it, the rope breaks and the tiger falls onto a sorghum stalk, killing him. The sorghum is covered with the tiger's blood, giving it its distinctive red color. The younger sister was afraid of the night, so she and her brother switched roles; the brother became the Moon and the sister the Sun. The shy sister emits a powerful light as she does not want to be stared at by people during the day.

== Analysis ==
Folktales in the form of Sun-sister, Moon-brother or Sun-brother, Moon-sister are widely distributed all over the world, and are also called Sun-Moon origin myths because they explain the origins of the Sun and Moon. In Korea, it has been widely transmitted orally under titles such as Brother and sister who became the Sun and Moon or The Sun and the Moon. The earliest recorded and reported material is the contents presented above, which is The Sun and the Moon (written by Zong In Sob), narrated by O Su-hwa in South Gyeongsang Province in 1911. Since it was published in an English book introducing Korean folktales under the title of The Sun and the Moon, only the plot is organized, but the basic motifs of this type of folktale are well equipped. The killing of the mother by the tiger, the confrontation between the tiger and the siblings, the ascension of the brother and sister, the punishment of the tiger, and the exchange of the Sun and the Moon between the brother and sister. Basically, it is a folktale in the form of an animal story in which a tiger appears, but it is not entirely an animal story. In order to understand this story, it is necessary to look at both the mythological context and the folktale context.

== Characteristics ==
The relationship between chasing and being chased is the driving force of this story, and the chasing being is not necessarily an animal, but it is also common that it is a human being. The brother chases the sister in one Manchu and one Inuit myth and a sister-in-law abuses the other sister-in-law to death in another Manchu myth. In the Nanai tribe, a man pursues a woman, and in Japan, a stepmother is a pursuer. When a person, not an animal, is the main character, the conflict within the family appears as a chasing and being pursued relationship. Therefore, it is appropriate to understand the case of brother and sister as a problem within family relationships.

In Inuit mythology, a mysterious man visits a woman nightly, and the woman mixes her lamp soot with her oil and applies it to her nipples to reveal the man's identity. The next day, seeing her brother's lips black, his sister leaves the village in shame, and her brother follows. The younger sister became the Sun and the older brother became the Moon. An eclipse occurs when the older brother catches up with his younger sister. This myth, which talks about the origin of the Sun and Moon and even the origin of the solar eclipse, presents the issue of incest as a key motive for the origin of the Sun and Moon. Although there are slight variations, the Manchurian myth is the same: the chasing brother's mirror becomes the Moon and the running sister's lantern becomes the Sun.

In the Korean fairy tale, however, the being chasing the sister is not the older brother, but the tiger; in fact, the older brother is also being chased by the tiger. The tiger, replacing the brother, erases the myth's motif of incest. Similarly, in the Inuit and Manchurian myths, a maternal figure does not appear. The existence of a mother being eaten by a tiger is a unique characteristic of Korean folktales.

== See also ==
- Sun and Moon (Disambiguation page for similar topics)
