= Sorghum production in Ethiopia =

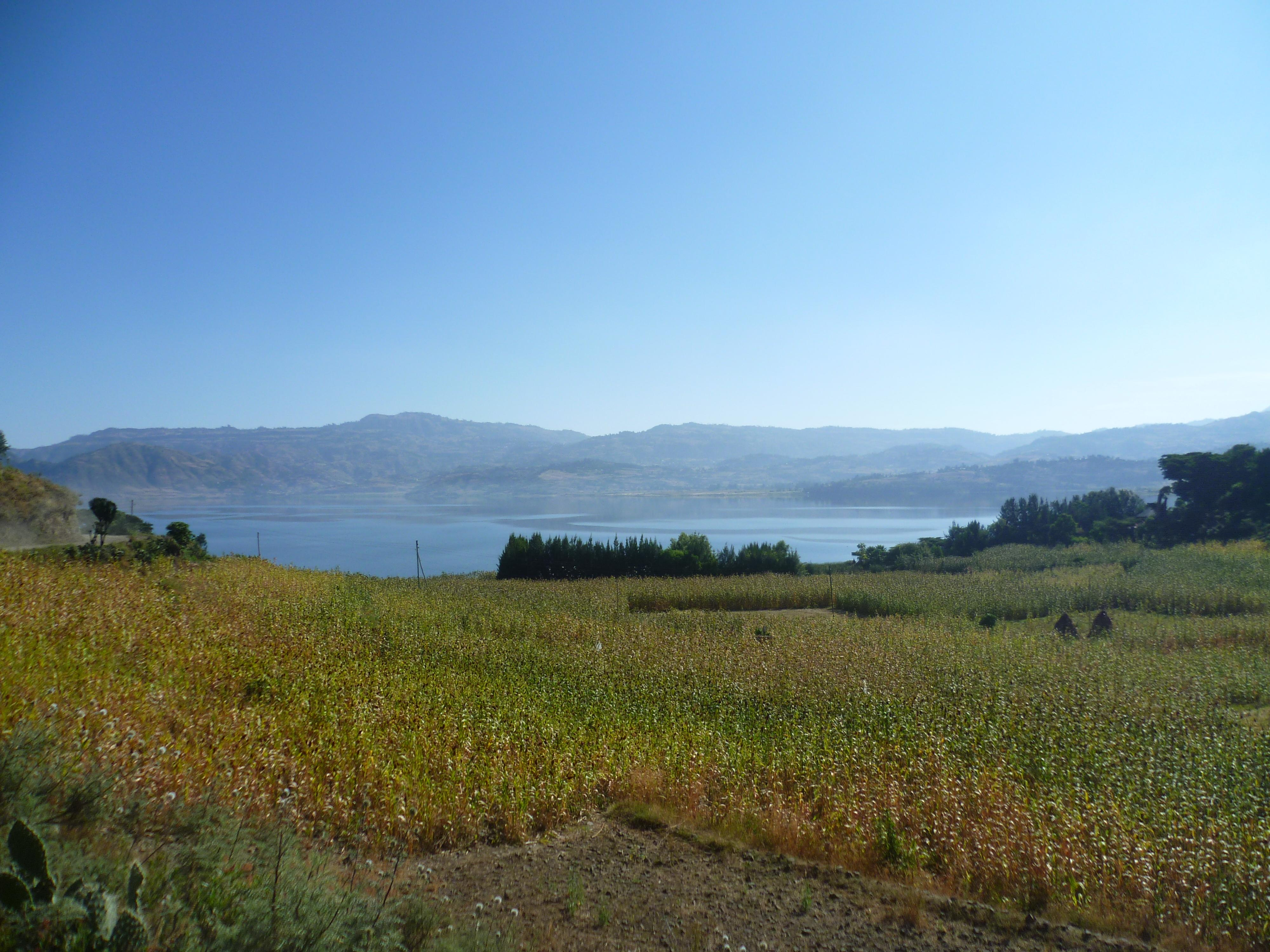
A sorghum field next to Lake Hayq.

Ethiopia is a major producer of sorghum, being the second-largest producer of the crop in Africa and one of the largest globally. Sorghum was domesticated in or near the country, and the crop had been cultivated there for thousands of years. It is one of the main agricultural products of the country, along with teff, maize, and wheat, being cultivated by almost 5 million farmers.

== History ==
Sorghum was first domesticated in the territory of present-day Ethiopia or neighboring Sudan sometime between 4,000 to 3,000 BC, and from the area spread to the Sahel region, East Africa, and beyond the continent. During the time of the Kingdom of Aksum, sorghum was well-established as a rain-fed crop. By the time of the arrival of Muslims in Ethiopia in the early seventh century, the Sorghum bicolor variety (durra sorghum) had already been present for at least 300 years.

In 1973, the Ethiopian Sorghum Improvement Program was set up to develop new varieties of sorghum and collect existing local varieties. Between 1980 and 1990, the number of "improved" cultivars of sorghum in Ethiopia increased from 1 to 7.

== Production ==
In 2022, Ethiopia was the world's sixth-largest producer of sorghum, and second-largest in Africa (behind Nigeria). In 2024, the country produced 4.1 million tonnes of sorghum, a 27 percent decline from its 2020 output of 5.63 million tonnes. This decline was attributed to a decline in cultivated area, droughts, conflicts in the producing regions, and the increasing spread of the parasitic striga weed. It is one of the country's main cereal crops, in 2010/11 covering 1.9 million hectares of farmland making it the third-most cultivated crop behind teff and maize, and second-most produced behind maize. By the 2020s, wheat had surpassed sorghum in both production and cultivated area, with the area under sorghum cultivation declining to 1.5 million hectares. 90 percent of Ethiopia's crop in 2020/2021 were in the Oromia, Tigray, and Amhara regions.

Around 4.9 million farmers cultivated sorghum in 2022. The Food and Agriculture Organization reported that compared to other key cereal crops (wheat, barley, teff, and maize), sorghum farmers sold a lower percentage of their crop to market, had less credit access, used less improved seeds, and only around half used fertilizers compared to over 90 percent for barley, teff, and wheat farmers. International trade was minimal, with only 600 tonnes of sorghum exported in 2023, further hampered by intermittent export bans on grains imposed by the Ethiopian government to conserve domestic supply.

== Usage ==
In eastern and northwestern Ethiopia, sorghum comprised around 10 percent of the caloric intake. Around three-quarters of the crop are used in the production of injera bread, where sorghum generally serves as a substitute for other cereals. The rest of domestic production was mainly used as animal feed or alcohol production, although supply constraints and increased prices have led to a decline in animal feed use.
