= Nangnang fish =

Scientific classification
- Kingdom: Animalia
- Phylum: Chordata
- Class: Actinopterygii
- Division: Teleostei
- Order: Characiformes
- Family: Alestidae
- Genus: Brycinus
- Species: B. nurse

Binomial name
- Brycinus nurse (Rüppell, 1832)

Synonyms
- Myletes nurse Rüppell, 1832

Species of fish

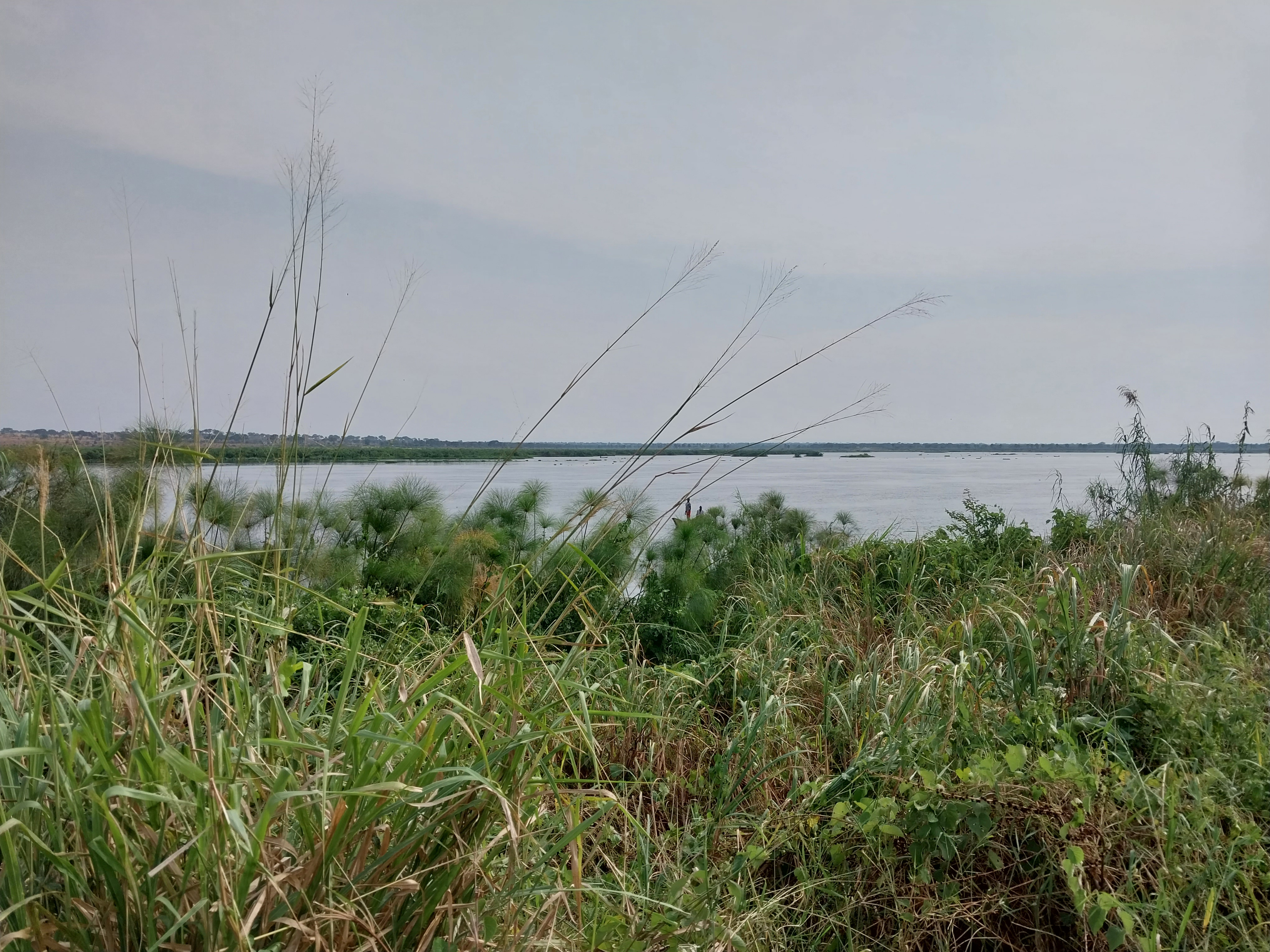
Pakwach West Nile River

Nangnang fish, also known as Brycinus nurse, or Onang nang or Ragogi, is a species freshwater fish in the family Alestidae. It is widely distributed in East Africa and is harvested as food in parts of Uganda, including Pakwach district, West Nile sub-region along the Nile Basin. The fish is locally processed and consumed, and contributes to households income and regional fish trade. The fish areis deep-fried in hot oil and consumed by the local community and travelers plying the Kampala-Arua highway. The fish provides a source of income to vendors and their families.

== Taxonomy and nomenclature ==
- Scientific name is Brycinus nurse
- It belongs to Alestidae family
- Its commonly known as Nangnang fish, Onang nang, Ragogi (in some part of Uganda)

== Distribution and habitat ==
Although locally associated with the nile and fresh water bodiesin Pakwach District, Brycinus nurse has a broader natural distribution across African freshwater systems, including the nile basin, Lake Albert, and neighboring river nwtworks. It is a fresh water species typically found in less salin waters such as rivers and lakes.

== Description ==
Nangnang is a small to medium fish with generally greyish body and a hint of golden tones when fried or fresh. It is consumed by various ethnic groups in the West Nile region, including the Alur people. The species is often harvested in large numbers due to its schooling behavior and relative abundance in suitable freshwater habitats. It is found in less saline waters such as the White Nile and fresh rivers. It is a crunchy snack that is served on the move. During preparation, the fish is washed, sorted into different sizes and then deep fried from silver-grey to golden brown.

== Ecology and biology ==
Brycinus nurse is an omnivorous freshwater fish that feeds on variety of aquatic plants such as zooplankton, insects, and small invertebrates. Studies from other regions indicate that this diet contributes to its ecological success across diverse river and reservoir environments. The species grows to moderate lengths typical of small pelagic fish and undergoes spawning during wet seasons in many parts of its range, including reproductive cycles influenced by flooding and seasonal water changes.

== See also ==
- Nsenene
- Alakena
- Ugandan Cuisines
