= Sun and Moon (Inuit myth) =

Inuit myth

The Sun and Moon is an unipkaaqtuat, a story in Inuit folklore. The traditional explanation for the movement of the Sun and Moon through the sky is that a brother and sister are constantly chasing each other across the sky. The story also explains the moon's dappled gray appearance as soot smeared on his face.

== Names ==
The brother is most often called Aningaat. In other versions he is simply called Moon (Inuktitut: ᑕᖅᑭᖅ, romanized: taqqiq, lit. 'moon'). He is sometimes equated with Tarqiup Inua. Gayle Uyagaqi Kabloona calls him Igaluk.

The sister is most commonly called Sun (Inuktitut: ᓯᕿᓂᖅ, romanized: siqiniq, lit. 'sun'; Greenlandic: seqineq; Natsilingmiutut: heqineq). Other times she is simply called "Aningaat's sister". An account by Hans Egede reports her being called Malina or Ajut in Greenland. Gayle Uyagaqi Kabloona, of Canadian Inuit descent, also calls her Malina.

One version says their names are Taqqiq and Siqiniq, but that they call each other aninga and najanga, which are archaic forms of address between a brother and sister. Another version calls the brother aninga and the sister aleqa (meaning "older sister of a younger brother"). Bernard Saladin d'Anglure gives the etymology that Aningaat/Aningaq means "favorite brother", from ani ("brother" when a male is addressed by his sister) and one of several synonymous suffixes -ngaq, -ngaat, -ngaaq ("favorite").

== Versions ==
There are two parts to the story: the part about the blind boy and the loon, and the part about the sister and brother becoming the sun and moon.

Full tellings of the story include Repulse Bay storyteller Ivaluardjuk's telling from the early 1920s, Netsilik storyteller Thomas Kusugaq's telling from 1950, Igloolik storyteller George Kappianaq's telling from 1986, and Igloolik storyteller Alexina Kublu's telling from 1999.

The sun-and-moon part is sometimes told without the blind-boy part. Such tellings include the 1880s account by Franz Boas of what is reportedly an Akudnirmiut and Oqomiut version and a 1990 telling by Igloolik storyteller Hervé Paniaq.

The blind-boy part is also sometimes told without the sun-and-moon part, particularly by Athabaskan peoples to the west and south.

=== Blind boy and loon ===
Aningaat and his sister are orphans living with their grandmother (in some tellings their mother or stepmother). The brother is blind. One day a polar bear comes to their camp, to the window of their house. The brother shoots the bear through the window, but his grandmother lies and says he only hit the window frame. The grandmother butchers the bear in secret, keeping the meat for herself and the girl. The boy is given dog meat and not allowed to live in the main house. The sister gives her brother bear meat in secret.

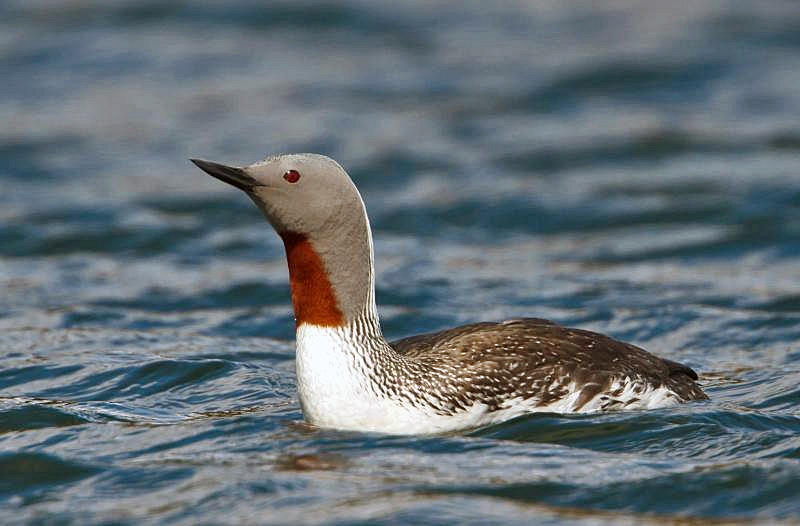
Red-throated loon (qaqsauq)

The brother asks his sister to take him to a nearby lake where there are red-throated loons. He stands by the lake until he hears the sound of a kayak and a voice invites him to sit in it. He sits and is paddled toward the center of the lake. (In Kusugaq's telling he is simply led into the lake, without a kayak). They are submerged. When Aningaat needs air, they resurface. After taking air, they dive again. The stranger asks if he can see. This repeats several times: they dive, the stranger asks the boy if he can see. The stranger licks the boy's eyes (a detail not in Ivaluardjuk's version) and they dive again. Each time the boy can see a little more, and by the end he is no longer blind. The stranger is a loon (a detail not in Kappianaq's version).

Returning home, Aningaat asks his grandmother about the bearskin he can now see. She lies, saying she got it from people who visited in an umiaq.

Now that he can see, the boy makes a harpoon and uses it with white whales passing along the shore. One day his grandmother comes hunting whales with him, serving as the anchor for the harpoon line. She tells him to harpoon the smallest whale, but he harpoons the largest. The large whale pulls her into the water, she surfaces once more, then disappears under the water. (In Kappianaq's version she becomes a narwhal, her hair becoming the horn).

Aningaat and his sister move to a new camp. There, while getting water, the sister is attacked. The brother saves her. He heals her, then they move to a new camp.

They move to a new camp, inhabited by people who lack genitalia or anuses. Nonetheless both siblings marry people from this group, and the sister becomes pregnant and gives birth.

=== Sun and Moon ===
This version is much like the blind-boy version, but covers only the end of the story, beginning with the assault in the dark.

During a festivity, someone comes into the sister's dwelling, extinguishes her qulliq lamp, and either fondles her, lies with, or assaults her. Knowing it will happen again, she puts soot on her face. Her assaulter comes again, getting soot on himself this time. When he leaves, she follows laughter is coming from the communal qaggiq where the festivity is happening. She goes and sees the people are laughing at Aningaat because he has soot on his face.

Devastated by this, she cuts off a breast (merely exposing it in Kappianaq) and offers it to him, telling him to eat it if he likes her body so much. (The bit about the breast is not in Kusugaq's telling). A chase ensues. Both are carrying torches but the brother's goes out. The chase ascends to the heavens where they become the sun and moon, still chasing each other.

=== Third version ===
Knud Rasmussen reports a Paallirmiut story from a storyteller named Kibkârjuk. This one differs from the others with a consensual, reciprocal relationship between the incestuous siblings. It still includes the key elements of siblings becoming the sun and moon, the sun torch flaming while the moon torch is only embers.

== Visual art ==
- In 1908, Frank Wilbert Stokes painted a mural on the North Wall of the Eskimo Hall of the American Museum of Natural History depicting "the artist’s conception of the Eskimo myth of the 'Sun and the Moon'".
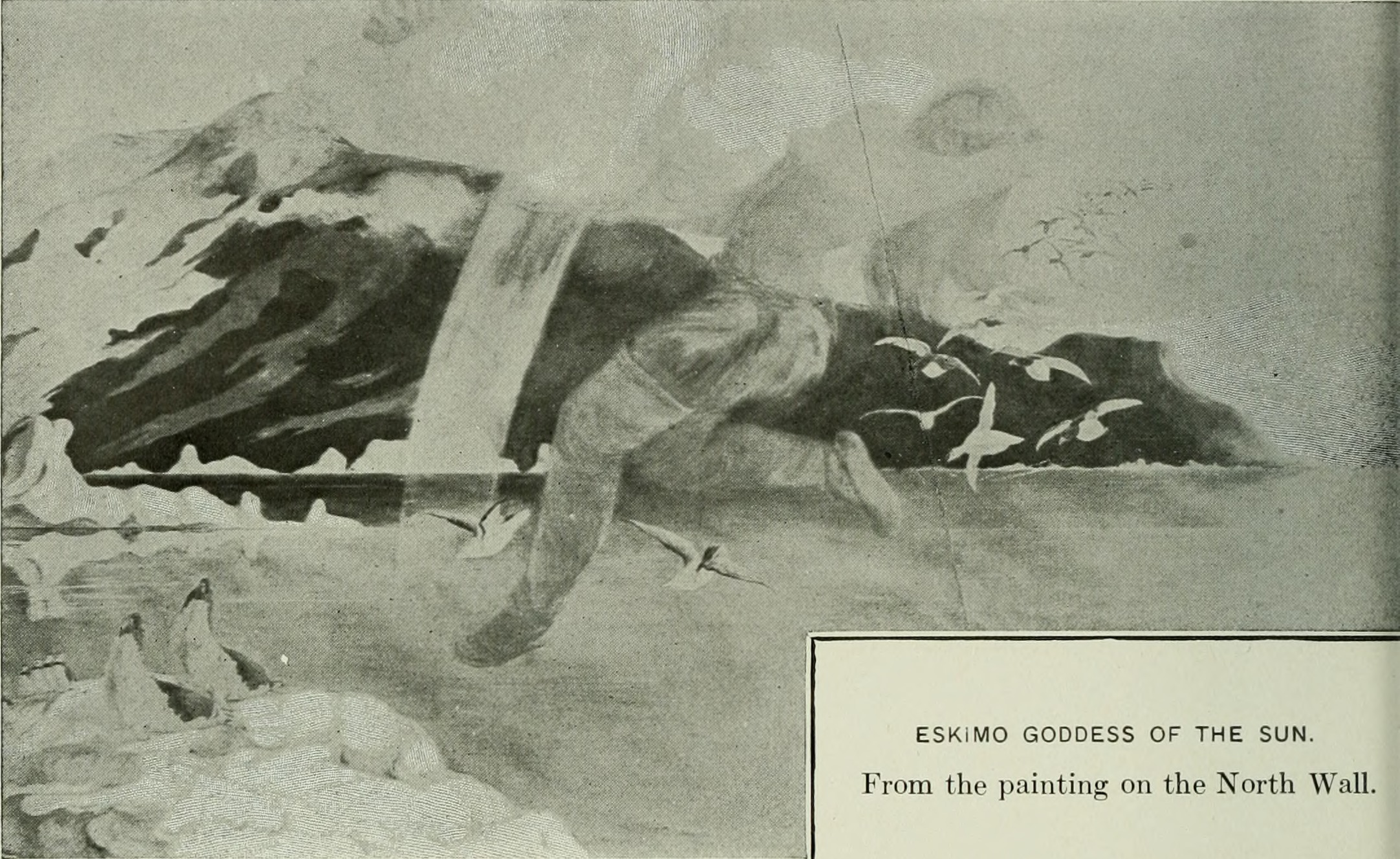
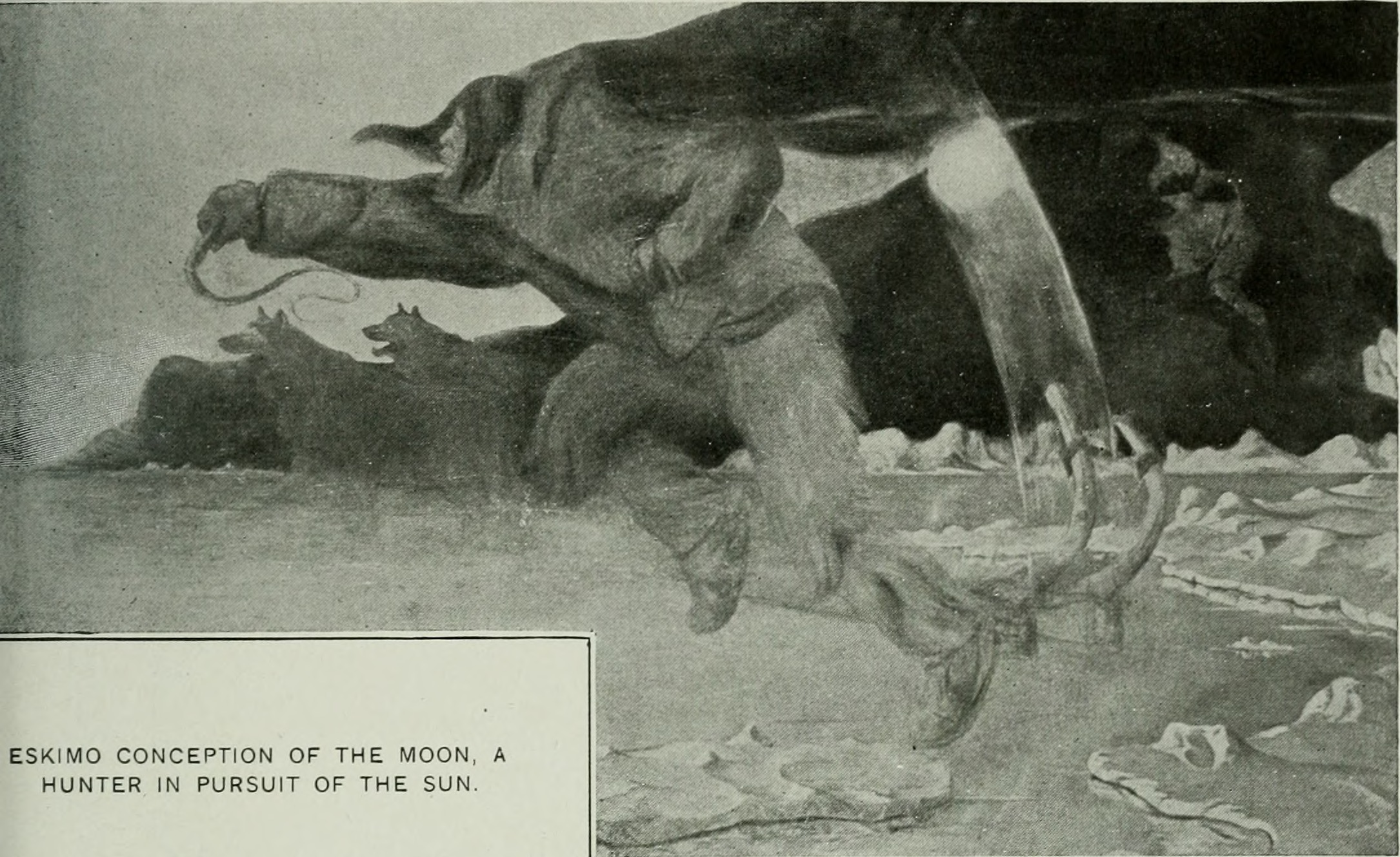
Frank Wilbert Stokes's mural
- Victoria Mamnguqsualuk did multiple prints depicting vignettes from this story:
  - Brother Moon and Sister Sun. 1982.
  - Sisters, Going Up. 2001. (Note: Despite its name, the picture depicts a brother and sister. The artist's granddaughter believes this title to be a mistranslation of an Inuktitut title and suggests that a more correct title would be Siblings, Going Up.)
- Gayle Uyagaqi Kabloona (2021). Malina.
  The artist describes it as a feminist reimagining of the story. It depicts the Sun goddess alone and unharmed, lighting a qulliq with a taqqut.

== See also ==
- First sunrise, a ritual that was inspired by the myth
- Brother and sister who became the Sun and Moon, a Korean story
