= Sun Moon (film) =

2023 Christian-themed film

- Directed by: Sydney Tooley
- Written by: Sydney Tooley; Susan Isaacs
- Produced by: Steve Taylor; Shun Lee
- Starring: MacKenzie Mauzy; Justin Chien; Madison McLaughlin; Michael Jong-Quin Huang; Jason Burkey
- Cinematography: Laticia Fan; Matt Huesmann
- Music by: Danny Seim
- Release date: May 5, 2023 (Pure Flix)
- Running time: 96 minutes
- Country: United States
- Language: English

Sun Moon is a 2023 Christian-themed film about a woman who takes a job teaching English to high school students in Taiwan after being left at the altar by her fiancé. The film's inspiration came from director Sydney Tooley's time in Taiwan as an English teacher. Filming took place in Yuchi in Taiwan's Nantou County and at Sun Moon Lake.

It was directed by Sydney Tooley and produced by Affirrm Films, a faith-based production company that is part of Sony Pictures. The film premiered on Pure Flix in May 2023. The film is a drama romance film.

== Reception ==
The Dove Foundation praised Sun Moon "a quiet film that reminds us in a powerful way" of God's presence. The Chinese Church Paper of Seventh-Day Adventists writer Chou Li-chuan lauded the film, writing, "The film captures stunning visuals that enhance its appeal, making the beautiful scenery of Nantou a standout highlight of the movie."
