= Alakena =

Traditional Lango termite-based dish

- Type: Traditional food
- Course: Main dish
- Place of origin: Uganda
- Region or state: Northern Uganda
- Created by: Lango people
- Serving temperature: Hot
- Main ingredients: Termites (Macrotermes spp.)
- Variations: With ground nuts, vegetables
- Other information: Seasonal delicacy (April-June)

Alakena is a traditional termite-based dish consumed primarily by the Lango people in Northern Uganda. This seasonal delicacy represents one of the most significant examples of entomophagy in East Africa and serves as both a nutritional supplement and cultural marker within Lango society.

== Preparation and seasonality ==
The preparation of Alakena occurs during a specific seasonal window, coinciding with the natural reproductive cycles of termite colonies. During this period, anthills prepare to release both winged termites and soldier termites, locally known as "Ngwen" in the Lango language. The timing is critical as it represents the peak availability of termites when they emerge from their underground colonies for their nuptial flight.

The dish is prepared from freshly ground termites, which are processed into a main course rather than served as a simple snack. The preparation process involves collecting the termites during their emergence, cleaning them, and grinding them into a paste-like consistency that forms the base of the dish. Dried winged termites are often preserved for consumption at a later date, extending the availability of this nutritious food source beyond the peak season.

== Cultural significance ==
Within Lango society, Alakena holds considerable cultural importance beyond its nutritional value. The dish is deeply embedded in traditional food systems and represents a connection to ancestral food practices that have been maintained for generations. Research conducted in the Lango sub-region indicates that winged termites (Macrotermes spp.), locally known as "Ngwen," are consumed by more than 97% of respondents in the area. Additionally, soldier termites (Syntermes soldiers), locally called "okok," are consumed by 73% of respondents, demonstrating the widespread acceptance and integration of termite consumption into local food culture.

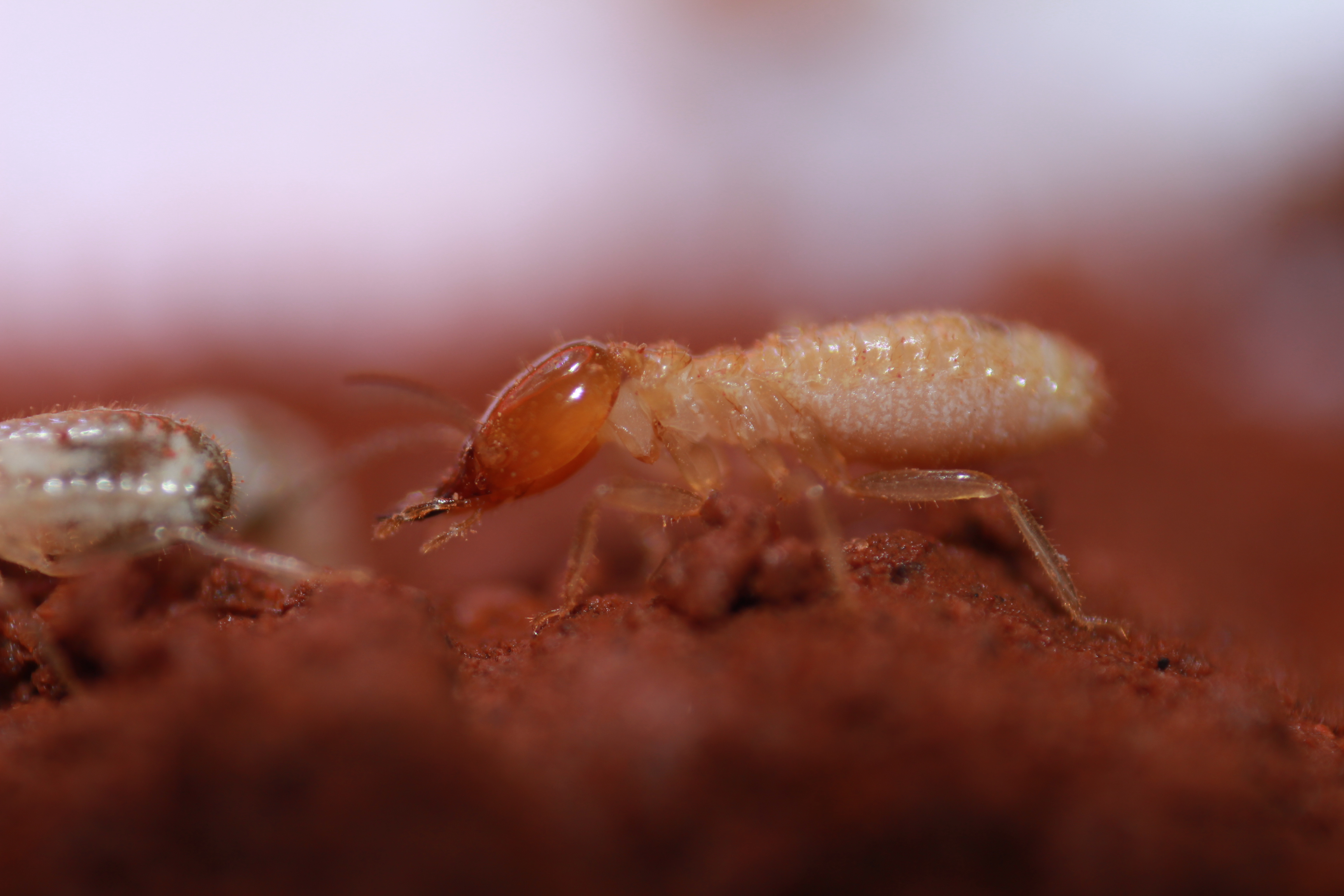
Termites

The consumption patterns reveal important social dynamics, with women and children consuming more edible insects than men. This distribution pattern suggests that Alakena serves as an important nutritional resource particularly for vulnerable populations, including pregnant and breastfeeding women who may benefit from the high protein and mineral content of termites.

== Nutritional profile ==
Scientific analysis of edible winged termites reveals significant nutritional benefits that justify their traditional consumption. Studies of Macrotermes species, the primary termites used in Alakena preparation, show exceptional protein content and beneficial fatty acid profiles. The termites contain four essential and cereal-limiting amino acids: lysine (1.0–1.3 mg/g), methionine (0.08–0.1 mg/g), leucine (0.6–0.9 mg/g), and threonine (0.1–0.2 mg/g).

Moreover, termites demonstrate a rich profile of essential minerals, including exceptionally high levels of iron (70.7–111.8 mg/100 g) and zinc (4.4–16.2 mg/100 g). This mineral composition makes Alakena particularly valuable in addressing common nutritional deficiencies in sub-Saharan Africa, where iron deficiency anemia and zinc deficiency are prevalent health concerns.

Research indicates that termites contain high-quality nutrients including highly digestible proteins, as well as minerals that are more bioavailable than minerals from plant foods. This bioavailability advantage suggests that Alakena may be particularly effective in addressing widespread nutrient deficiencies in the region.

== Regional context and ecosystem role ==
Alakena exists within a broader context of entomophagy practices across sub-Saharan Africa, where termites constitute approximately 10% of all animal biomass in tropical regions. Africa, with more than 1000 termite species, has the richest intercontinental diversity of termites globally, with the family Termitidae containing builders of great mounds up to 5 meters high.

The practice extends beyond the Lango people, with various ethnic groups across Uganda and neighboring countries maintaining similar traditions of termite consumption. This widespread adoption across different cultures demonstrates the practical nutritional benefits and cultural adaptability of termite-based dishes like Alakena.

== Food security and sustainability ==
The results of studies in the Lango sub-region show that insects are important as a food resource to the rural poor, serving as both a nutritional supplement and economic resource. However, research indicates that the majority of respondents did not know that insects are nutritious, suggesting opportunities for educational programs to enhance the recognition of traditional foods like Alakena as valuable nutritional resources.

The sustainable nature of termite harvesting practices, combined with their high nutritional density, positions Alakena as a potentially important component of food security strategies. The traditional knowledge systems surrounding termite collection and preparation represent sophisticated understanding of local ecosystems and seasonal patterns that have been refined over generations.

== Modern applications and research ==
Contemporary research has explored the potential for incorporating termite-based nutrition into modern food systems. Studies have shown that wheat products can be successfully enriched with termite flour, with 5% substitution showing significant increases in protein, retinol, riboflavin, iron, and zinc contents to the extent of between 16% and 53% increase.

Research conducted by Oxford Academic on nutritional characteristics of selected insects in Uganda for use as alternative protein sources in food and feed further supports the potential of traditional dishes like Alakena in addressing modern nutritional challenges.

== Challenges and preservation ==
Contemporary changes in agricultural practices, urbanization, and climate patterns pose challenges to the traditional preparation and consumption of Alakena. Environmental changes affecting termite colony behavior and emergence patterns may impact the seasonal availability that is crucial for traditional preparation methods. Additionally, changing dietary preferences among younger generations and increased access to processed foods may affect the transmission of traditional food knowledge.

However, growing recognition of the nutritional benefits of insect consumption and interest in sustainable food systems has led to renewed attention to traditional dishes like Alakena. This recognition supports efforts to document and preserve traditional food practices while exploring their potential contributions to modern food security challenges.

== See also ==
- Lugbara cuisine
- Nsenene
- Ugandan cuisine
