= Nobody's Perfect (1990 film) =

- Directed by: Robert Kaylor
- Written by: Wesley Moore; Allan Scott
- Produced by: Benni Korzen; Just Betzer
- Starring: Chad Lowe; Gail O'Grady
- Cinematography: Claus Loof
- Music by: Robert Randles
- Distributed by: Moviestore Entertainment
- Release date: 1990
- Language: English

Nobody's Perfect is a 1990 American comedy film directed by Robert Kaylor and starring Chad Lowe and Gail O'Grady.

== Plot ==
Stephen is kicked off his college's tennis team when his crush on his fellow tennis player Shelly makes it difficult for him to focus on playing. His friends Andy and Jackie convince him to go along with their plan to help him get closer to Shelly by coaching him through cross-dressing as his new female persona, the transfer student Stephanie. After avoiding detection in the women's locker room, he tries out for and joins the women's tennis team. Shelly asks Stephen to become her new roommate, to prevent her aggressive boyfriend from moving in with her, and he accepts the offer. He lives a double life for some time, taking classes both as himself and as Stephanie, and narrowly avoids getting found out several times, such as when having to undergo a medical exam. Shelly eventually learns of the scheme when seeing him urinating standing up, and is upset about his deception; the two pretend that Stephanie has moved home to Europe due to illness in the family, to explain his absence from tennis practice going forward.

Andy still wants Stephen to remain on the women's tennis team, but admits that it is due to having betted money on an upcoming tennis match; when Stephen risks suspension over plagiarism after having submitted the same barely-modified essay both as himself and as Stephanie, Andy apologizes by dressing up like Stephanie to take the blame, clearing Stephen's name. Stephen again assumes his female persona to join Shelly for the tennis match, and the two confess their love for each other. A talent scout in the audience is impressed and talks to Andy — who claims to be their manager — about signing both of them on to play professionally in international women's tennis. They win the match and kiss.

== Cast ==
- Chad Lowe as Stephen/Stephanie
- Gail O'Grady as Shelly
- Patrick Breen as Andy
- Kim Flowers as Jackie
- Robert Vaughn as Dr. Duncan
- Eric Bruskotter as Stanley
- Carmen More as Carla
- Todd Caldecott as Brad
- Annie Korzen as Professor Lucci
- Mariann Aalda as Coach Harrison
- Marcia Karr as Marge
- Nomi Mitty as Mrs. Parker

== Filming locations ==
- Pepperdine University campus: Portrayed as "Bramson College". Payson Library was renamed as Krozen Library and Firestone Fieldhouse was renamed Trembath Fieldhouse.
