= Åby Church =

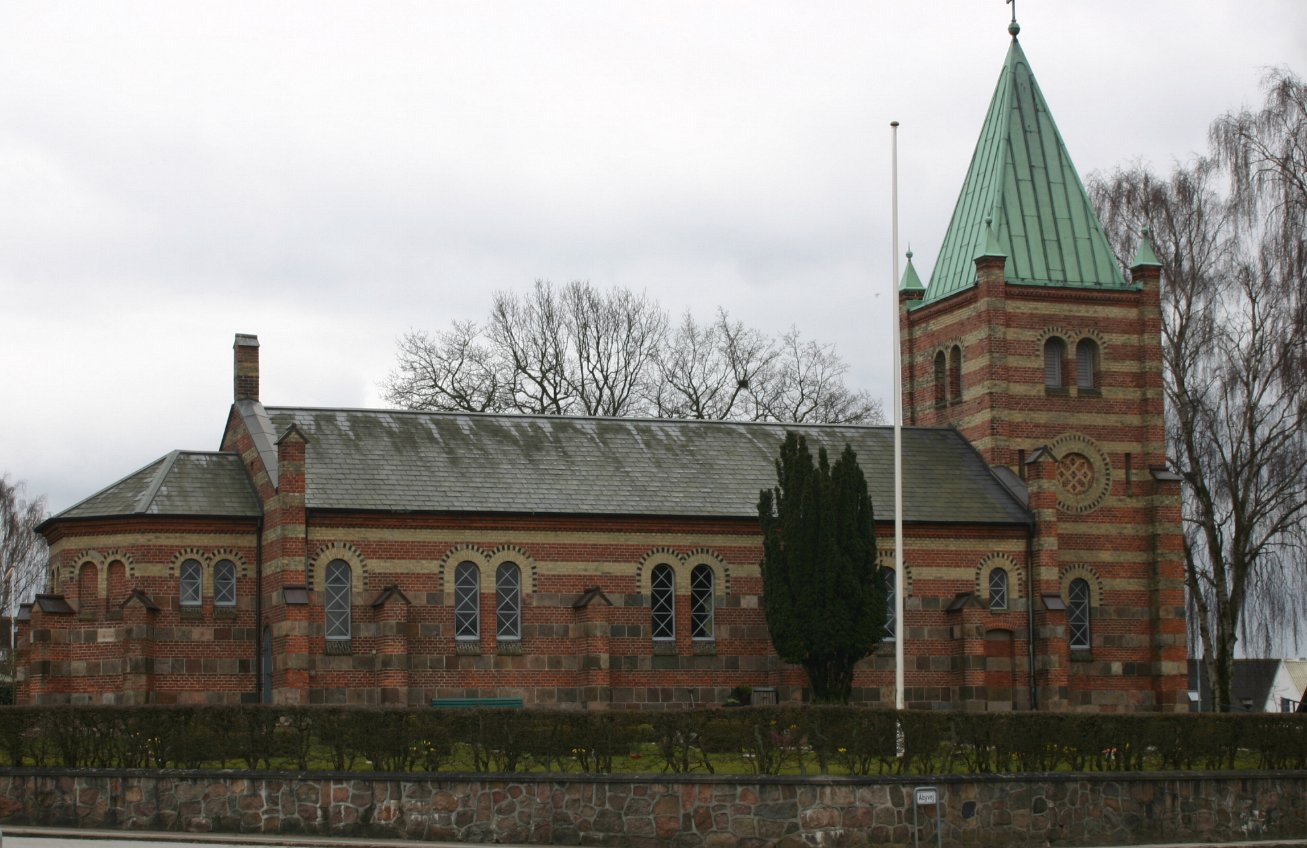
- Åby Church
- 56.145650°N 10.162269°E
- Location: Aarhus, Denmark
- Country: Denmark
- Denomination: Church of Denmark
- Previous denomination: Catholic

History
- Status: Church

Architecture
- Architectural type: Romanesque
- Completed: 1872

Specifications
- Materials: Brick

Administration
- Archdiocese: Diocese of Aarhus

Åby Church (Danish: Åby Kirke) is a church located in Åby Parish in Aarhus, Denmark. The church is situated in the neighbourhood Åbyhøj, west of Midtbyen. The church is today a parish church in the Church of Denmark, serving a parish population of 10.925 (2015). The Åby Church pastorate is shared with the Åbyhøj Church to the north.

== History ==
The church is situated in the western neighbourhood Åby which was formerly a village. The original church constructed of ashlar was built c. 1200 and in the Late Middle Ages it was lengthened towards the west. Two imposts in the chancel arch which were transferred to the new building, the one in the south is, owing to its cylindrical shape, assumed to be an imitation in stone of a decorated wooden post.

== Architecture ==
The present building was constructed in 1872–73 when it was decided it wasn't economical to renovate the former medieval church. The church was designed by Vilhelm Theodor Walther, who worked as the royal building inspector for Jutland at the time, in romanesque style imitation inspired by Italian elements. The walls are bands of yellow and red bricks and the building resembles a traditional apse, chancel, nave and tower. In 1929 the tower spire was made taller and clad in copper.

In the north wall by the tower a walled off entrance with a staircase presents a curiosity. In older churches there was typically a north and south entrance - men and women entrances - and in most churches the north entrance have later been walled off. The original medieval church also had two entrances and it is thought the architect Vilhelm Theodor Walther chose to emulate this by deliberately putting in a walled off entrance.

== Interior ==
While nothing in the interior remains from the original church a couple of items of church furniture were transferred from the demolished church and are still in use. These are the altar-piece from 1598 with a carved crucificial group in front of the middle panel and Old Testament paintings on the side panels and the Romanesque baptismal font of granite. A crucifix from the latter half of the 11th century has been in the National Museum since 1870. It is probably the earliest of the Jutland crucifixes which belong with the »golden altars« and was presumably made in the same workshop as the Lisbjerg altar.

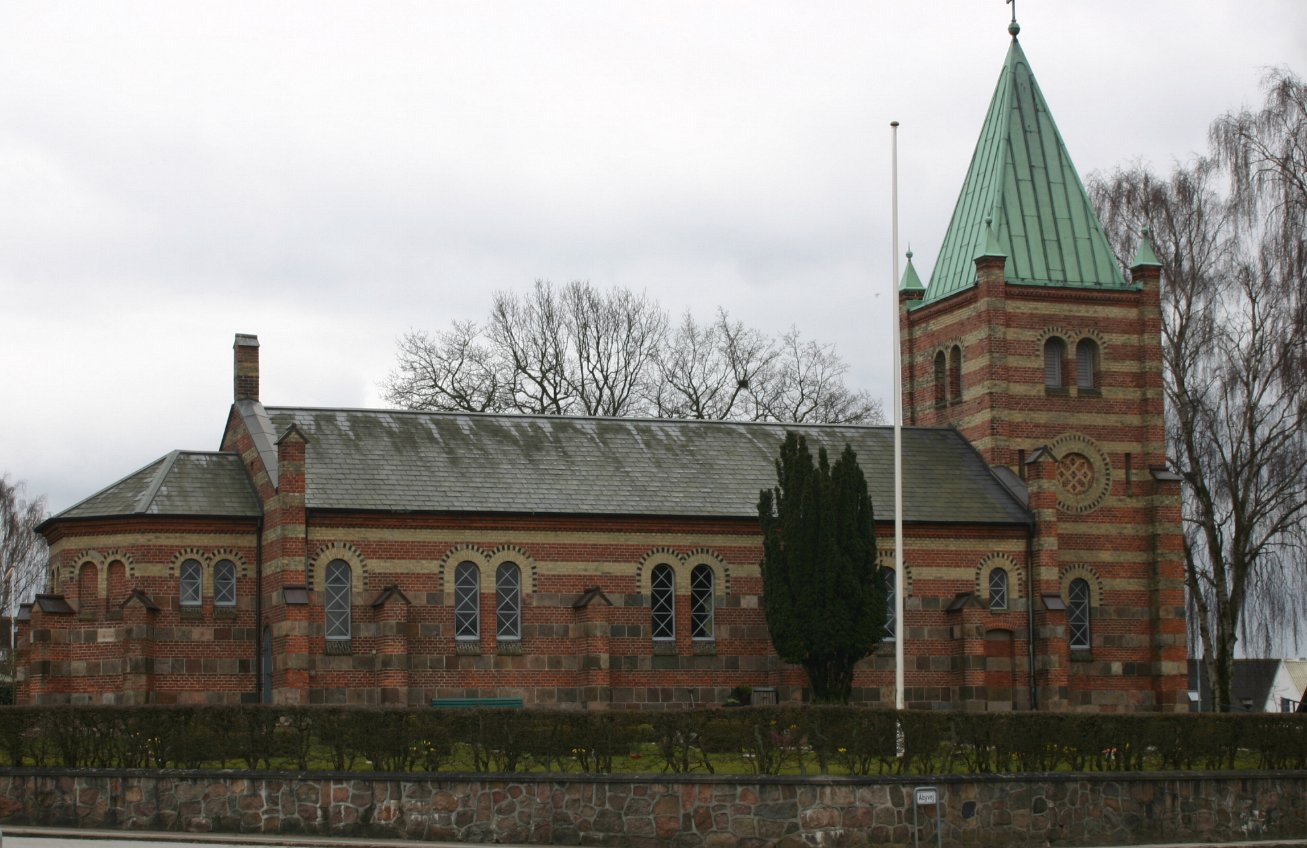

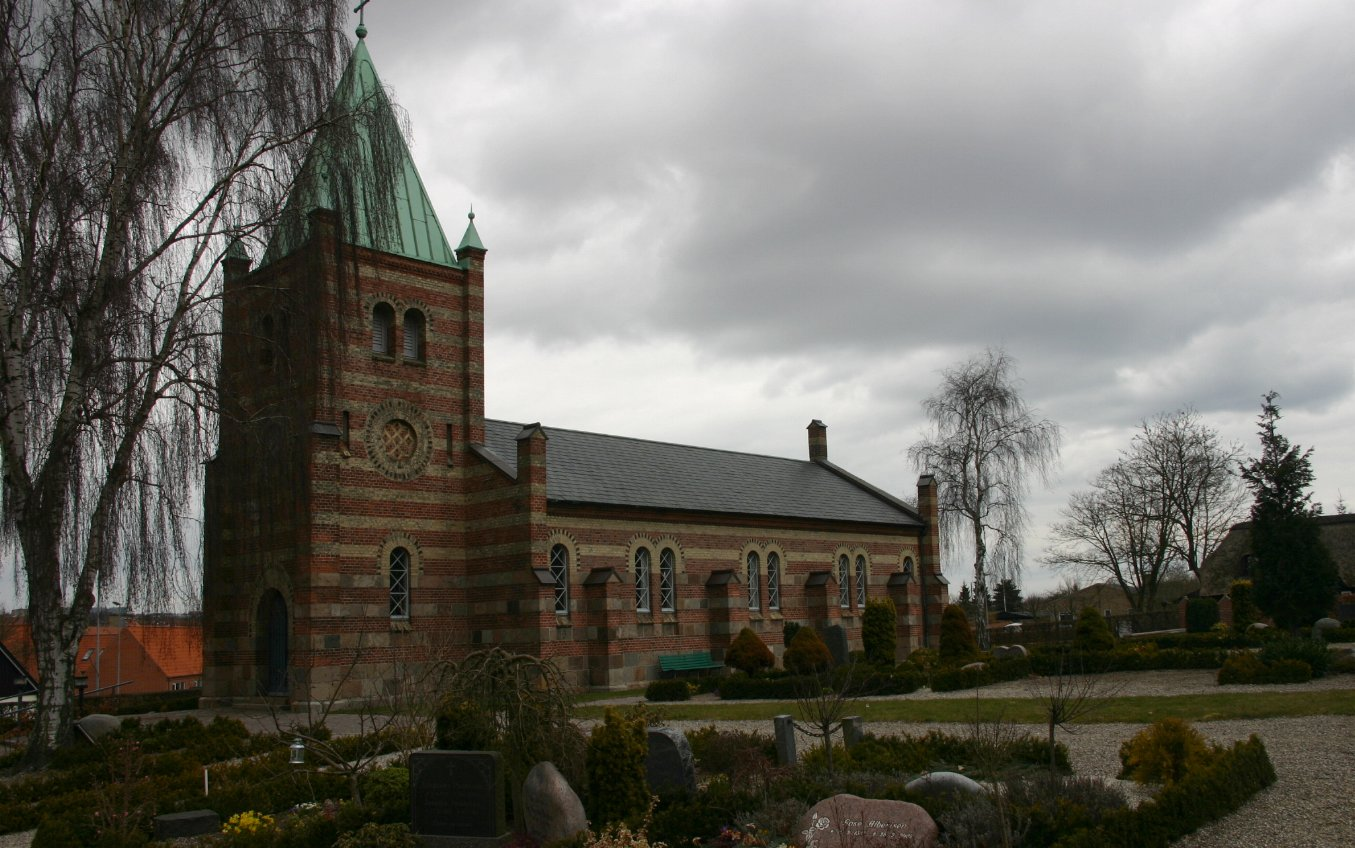

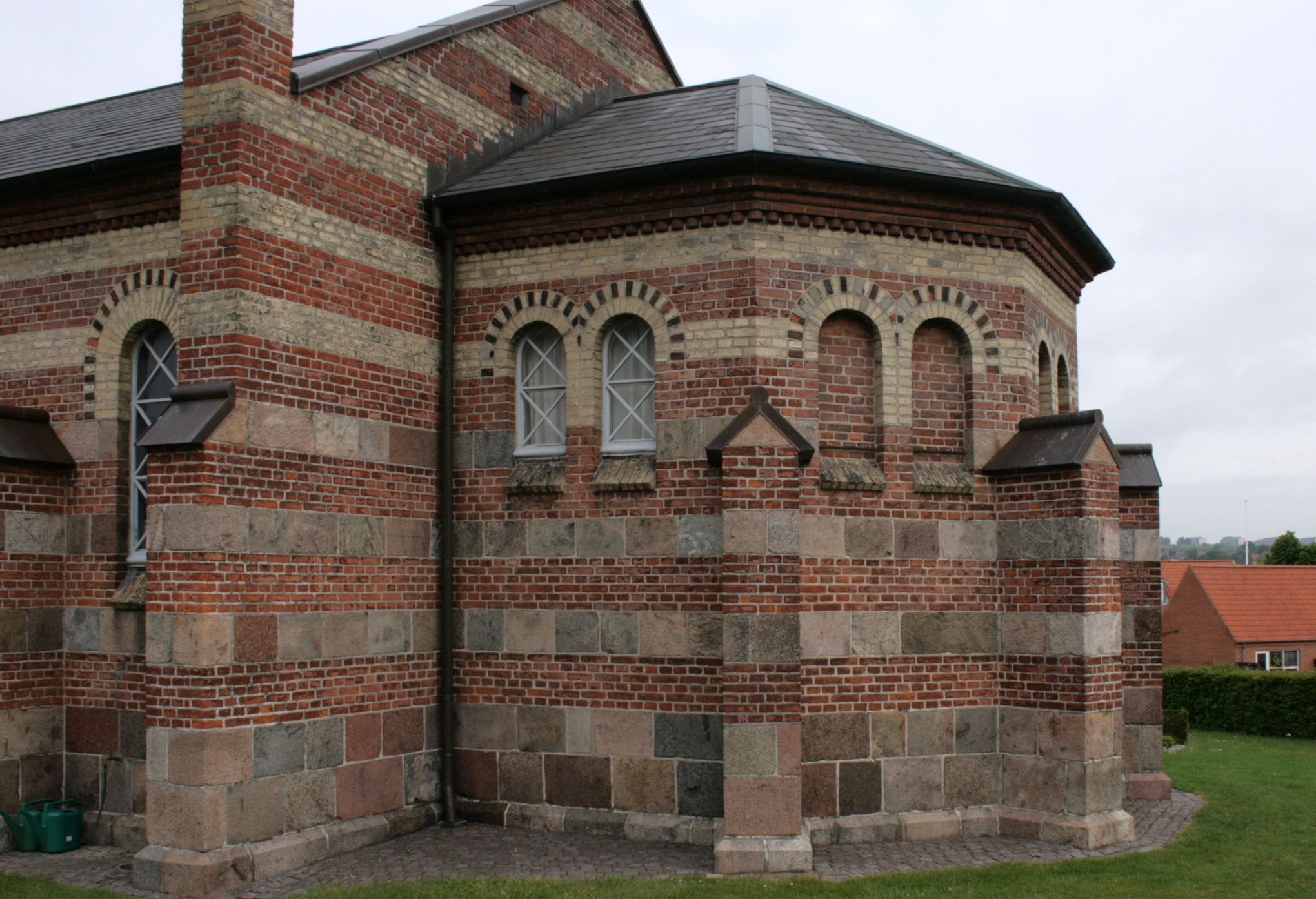

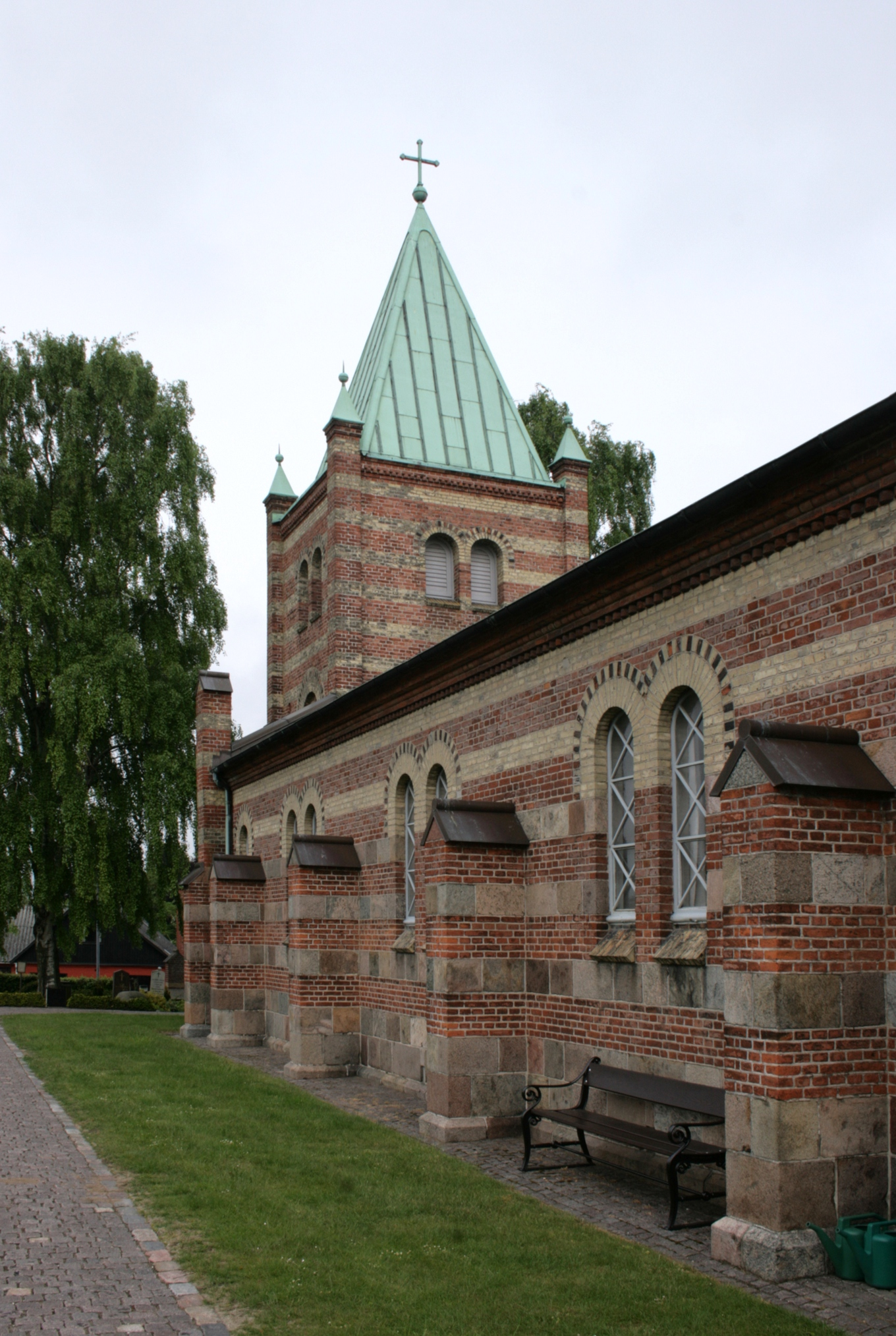

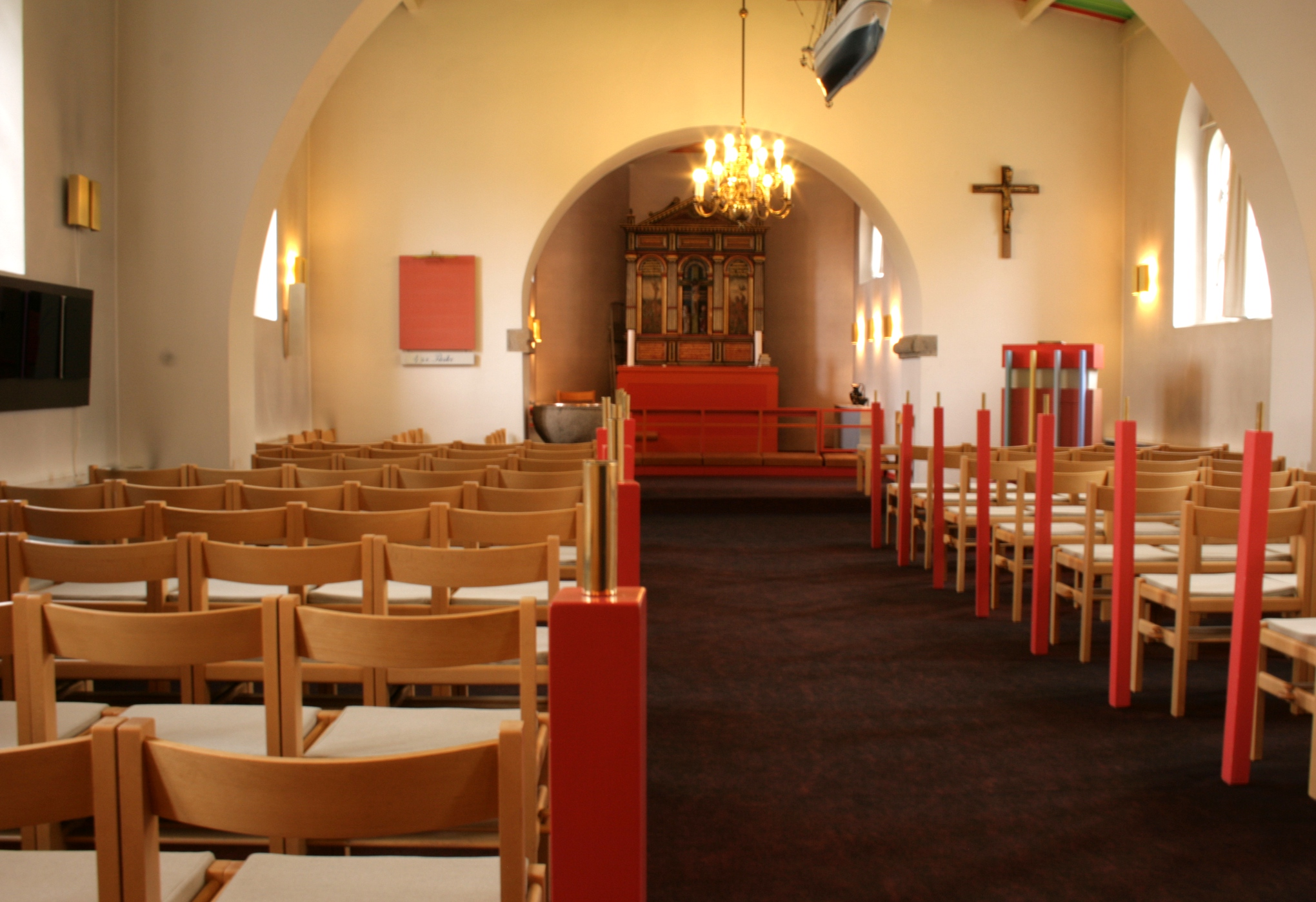

== See also ==
- List of Churches in Aarhus
