= Frederik's Church, Aarhus =

Frederik's Church
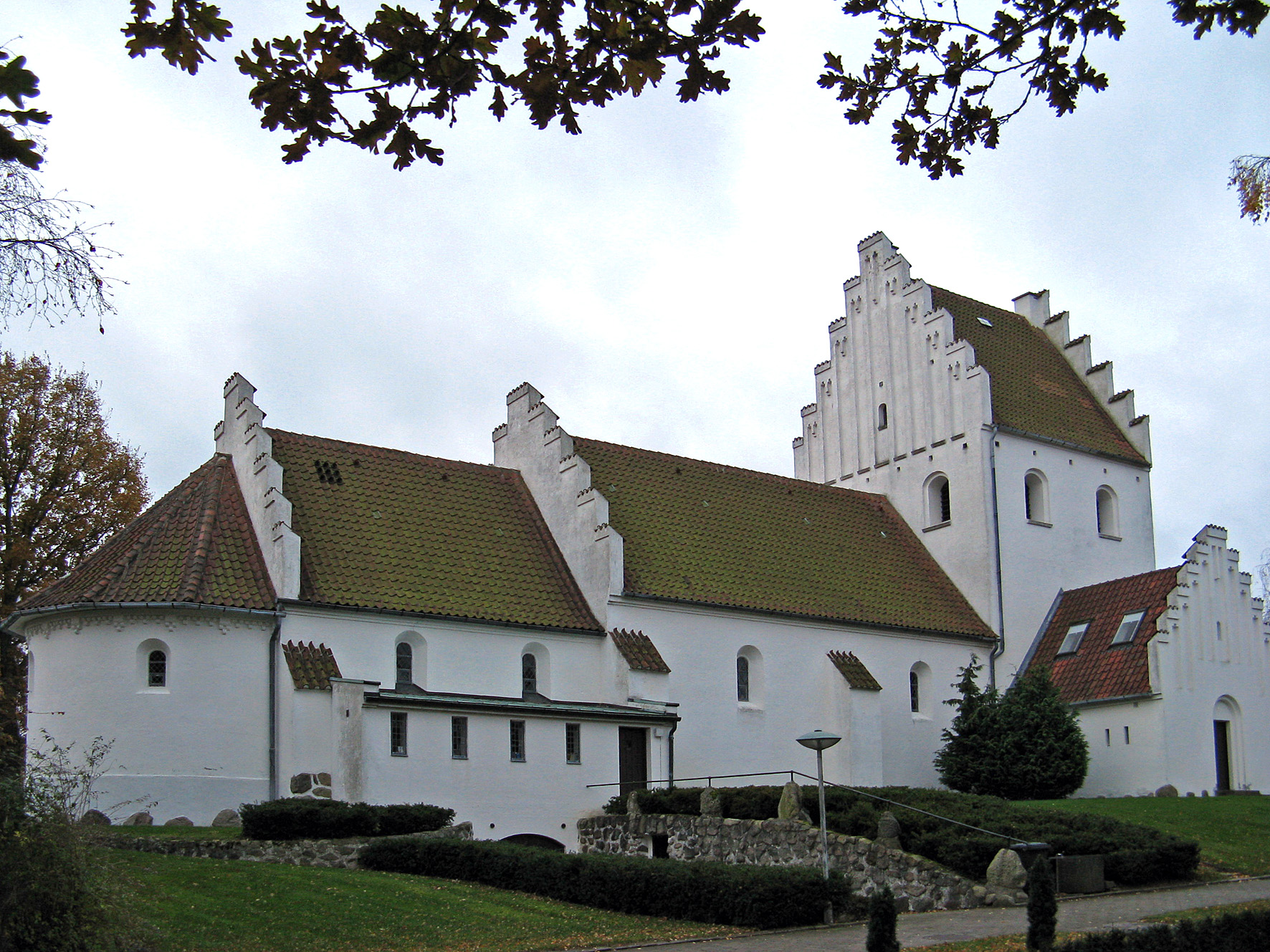
- Frederik's Church
- Frederik's Church
- 56.1115°N 10.2119°E
- Location: Hørhavevej 3; 8270 Højbjerg
- Country: Denmark
- Denomination: Church of Denmark

History
- Status: Church

Architecture
- Completed: 1944

Specifications
- Materials: Brick

Administration
- Archdiocese: Diocese of Aarhus

Frederik's Church (Danish: Frederikskirken) is a church in Aarhus, Denmark. The church is situated in the southern Højbjerg neighbourhood on Hørhavevej. Frederik's Church is a parish church, and the only church in Skåde Parish, under the Diocese of Aarhus within the Church of Denmark, the Danish state church. The church serves some 11,000 parishioners in Skåde Parish and holds weekly sermons along with weddings, burials and baptisms.

Frederik's Church is the last Danish church which draws obvious inspiration from the medieval architectural tradition; in the years following the Second World War architecture generally diverged in many different directions. The architect was Harald Lønborg-Jensen who also designed Åbyhøj Church. In its early years, Frederik's Church served as an annex to Holme Parish, with the same priest overseeing both parishes. Skåde Parish was established in 1949, gaining its own pastorate when Holme Parish was divided. The church is named after crown prince Frederik, later king Frederik IX and the initials for the royal couple of the time is engraved in the front most benches.

In 1973, an adjacent building was added to Frederik's Church to host parish council meetings and communal activities. Due to population growth in the 1950s and 1960s, the church had become too small to meet the community’s needs, prompting the decision to construct a separate facility for additional functions. The building was named Frederiksgården to follow the tradition of the church.

Frederik's Church is a Green Church (Grøn Kirke). Green Churches is a network of Danish churches dedicated to implement and further an environmentally friendly operation and climate actions in relation to the current climate crisis. The network agenda was launched by the National Council of Churches in Denmark (NCCD) in 2011.

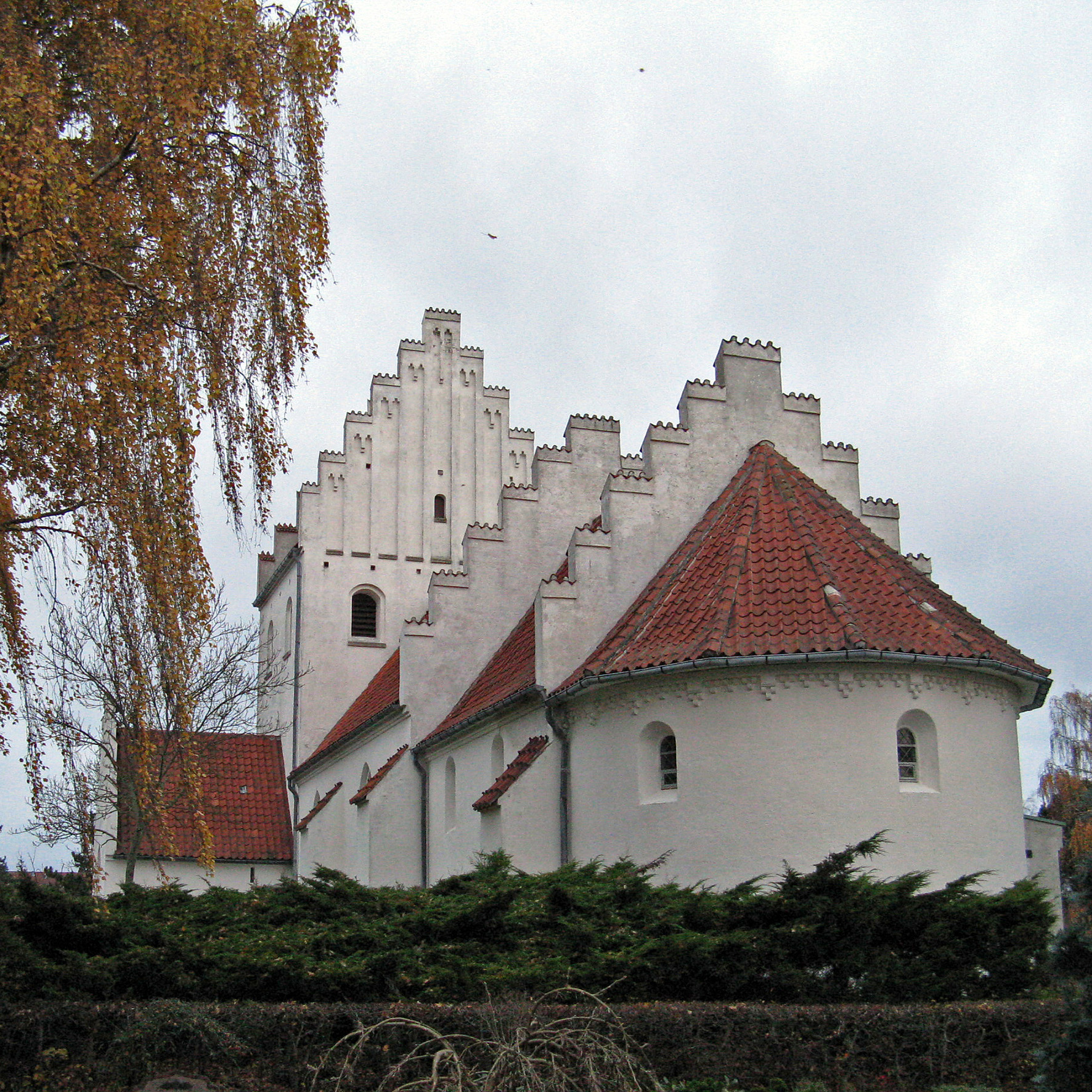
Rear view

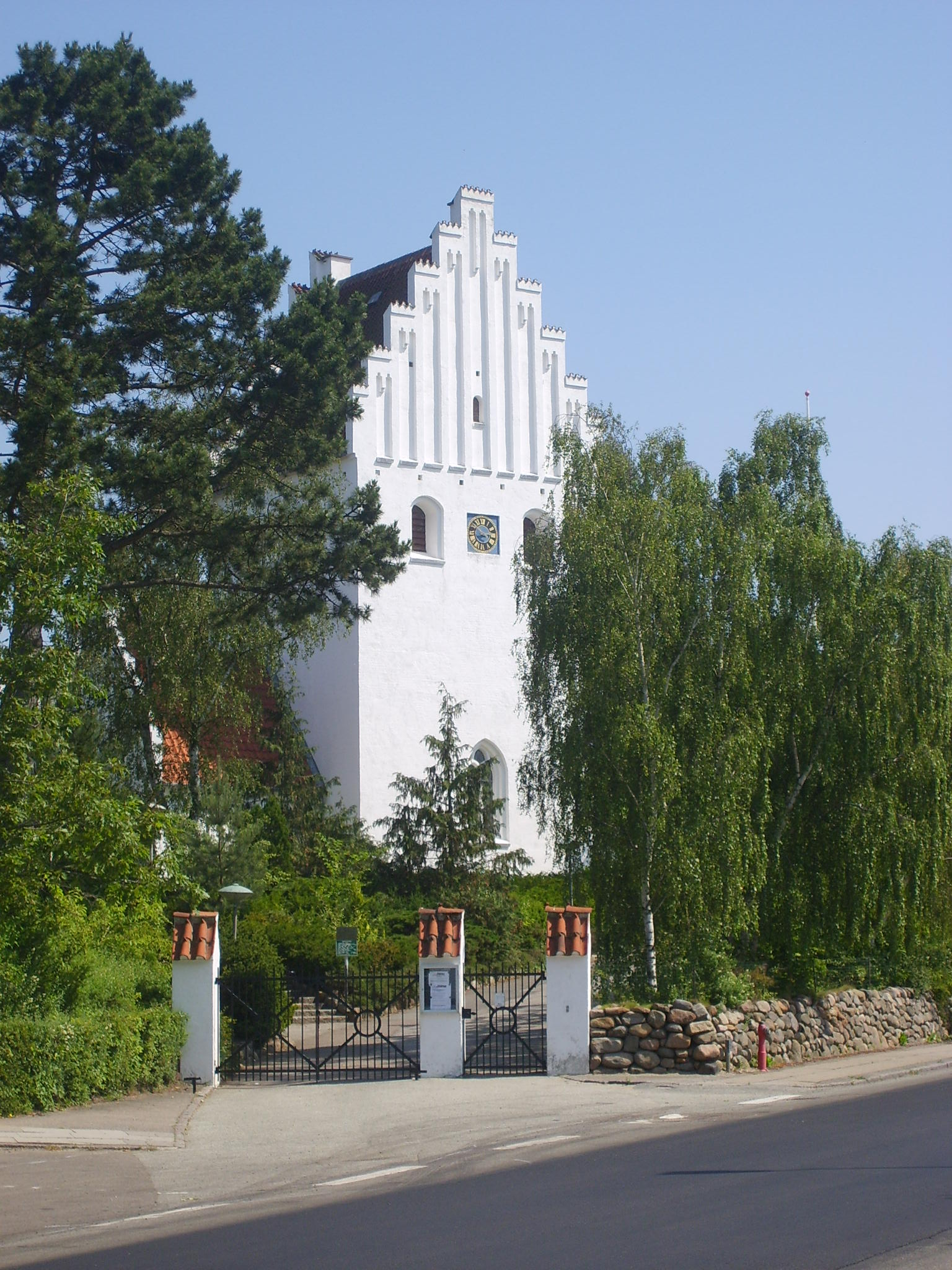
Front entrance

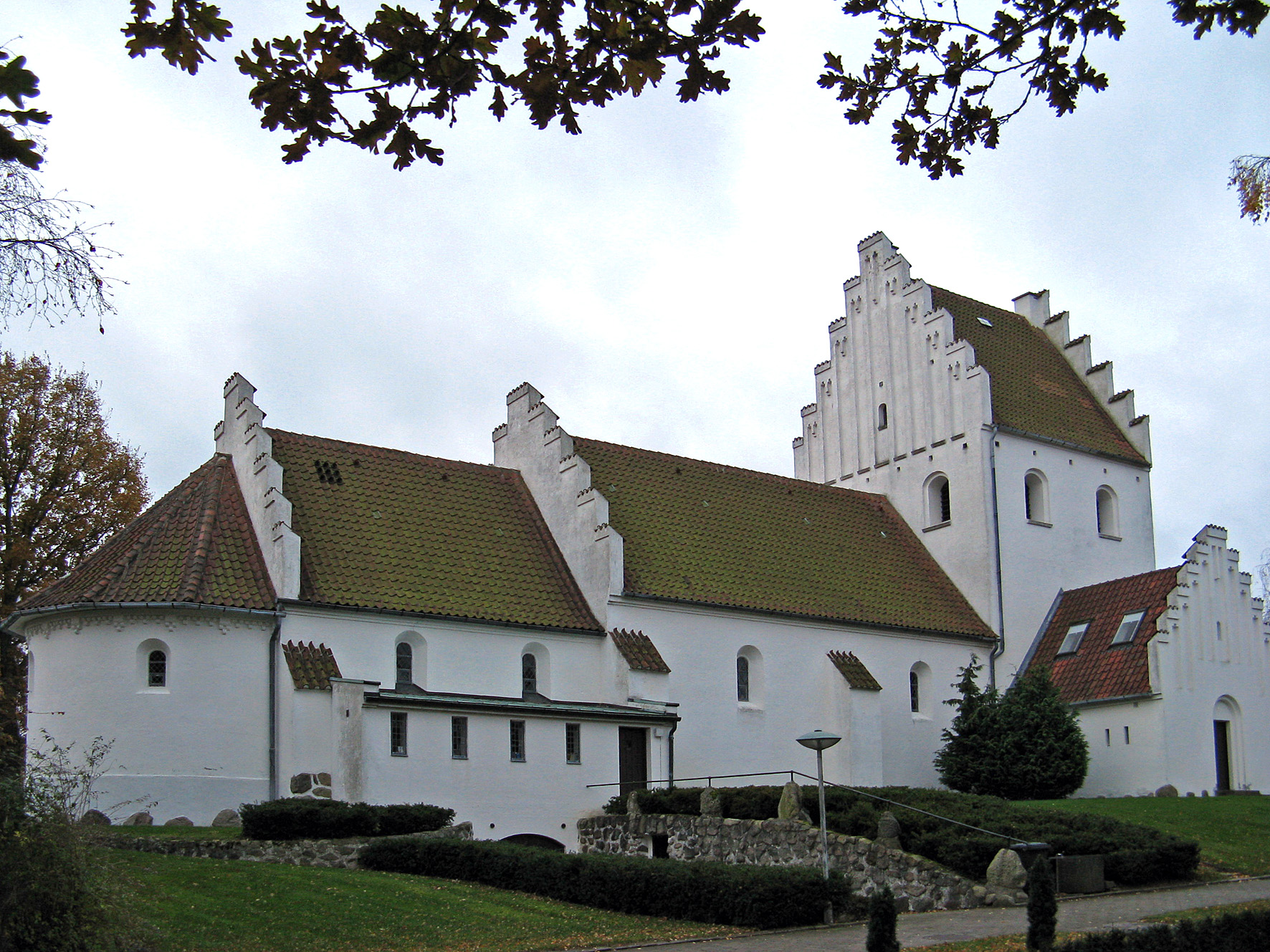
View from east

== See also ==
- List of churches in Aarhus
