= Annie Korzen =

American actress

- Born: Anne Drazen; Bronx, New York, New York, U.S.
- Education: High School of Music & Art; Bard College
- Occupations: Actor; humorist; writer; storyteller
- Years active: 1974 – Present
- Spouse(s): Benni Korzen (m. 1964)
- Website: www.anniekorzen.com

Annie Korzen (née Drazen) is an American actress, comedian, writer and social media personality.

Korzen is well known from the television show Seinfeld, appearing in the recurring role of Doris Klompus, an obnoxious neighbor living in Jerry's parents' Florida condo complex. She was also seen on the show's season 4 episode, "The Airport", as an annoying airline passenger bothering Elaine Benes in economy class.

== Early years ==
Born and raised in the Mosholu Parkway section of the Bronx, Korzen is the daughter of Russian-born parents, Sonia and Abe Drazen. Interviewed in 1998, she recalled her musical upbringing. Korzen's mother was "a depressed agoraphobic [who] made me study the piano so that when I grew up, I could give piano lessons at home and not have to go out into the world to earn a living", while her father, a tailor by trade, had, by the mid 1960s, famously moonlighted as the "Pied Piper of Washington Square", a fact duly noted by both Newsweek and The New York Times. His singular act, complete with homemade slide whistle, would soon become a featured attraction for two famous Allens during the early 1970s; first, Woody, in his made-for-PBS, but never screened 1971 mockumentary, Men of Crisis: The Harvey Wallinger Story, and then Steve, himself guest-hosting for Dick Cavett in 1972. For her part, Korzen evidently heeded her mother's advice in large part, attending Public School 94, then the High School of Music & Art, and, finally, Bard College, class of 1960. Following additional studies in Europe and a 1961 piano recital at her alma mater, Korzen—still as Anne Drazen—had, by 1963, become employed as an instructor at the Lachmund Piano Studios in Yonkers.

== Acting career ==
Korzen began her career as an actress-writer in New York Off-Broadway theater. She has appeared in television shows including Seinfeld, Whitney, and The Exes as well as in the motion pictures Tootsie, Stardust Memories, and Nobody's Perfect, which she co-wrote. She has also appeared in Transformers: Revenge of the Fallen, Neil Simon's The Prisoner of Second Avenue, and In Embryo, directed by Danish Actor Ulrich Thomsen.

Korzen has written, composed, and performed two solo shows. "Yenta Unplugged" celebrates Jewish women through comedy and music. The second show, "The Yenta Cometh" is about the price one pays for speaking out.

She is also a speaker on the lecture circuit with the interactive talks, "The Good Yenta: A Humorous Celebration of Jewish Women” and "Show and Tell with the Bargain Junkie". She also performs an evening of humorous stories called "Tales from the Mouth: Mishaps, Fiascoes, and other Triumphs".

In 1993, Korzen was a guest on The Oprah Winfrey Show, in an episode entitled "Ethnic Men Who Reject Their Own Women", a topic Korzen had suggested to the show's producers.

== Writing career ==
Korzen's commentaries have been heard on NPR's Morning Edition, and her essays have been printed in publications such as the New York Times, Los Angeles Times, San Francisco Chronicle, and the Jewish Journal of Los Angeles. Her spoken-word performances have appeared on showcases such as Comedy Central's "Sit 'n Spin", "Tasty Words", "Sparks" and The Moth.

She published an op-ed in the New York Times on August 2, 2026 titled “The Marriage I Cherished No Longer Existed” about the life changes caused by the illness and death of her husband of more than 60 years.

Her book Bargain Junkie: Living the Good Life on the Cheap, is a humorous how-to about enjoying an upscale lifestyle on a budget. It was published by Andrews McMeel Universal.

She also released The Book of Annie: Humor, Heart, and Chutzpa from an Accidental Influencer in 2023. In this collection of humorous personal essays and random observations, Annie offers her unabashed takes on a variety of provocative topics. It was published by Permuted Press.

== Personal life ==
In April 1964, two months after meeting via blind date (orchestrated by mutual friend Michael Maslansky), Anne Drazen and Danish-born producer Benni Korzen were wed. They have one child, a son, Jonathan.

== Seinfeld episodes ==
- "The Pen" (1991)
- "The Airport" (1992)
- "The Raincoats" (1994)
- "The Cadillac" (1996)
