= The Misfit Brigade =

1987 film by Gordon Hessler

- Directed by: Gordon Hessler
- Screenplay by: Nelson Gidding
- Produced by: Just Betzer; Benni Korzen
- Starring: Bruce Davison; D. W. Moffett; Keith Szarabajka; David Patrick Kelly
- Cinematography: George Nicolic
- Edited by: Robert Gordon; Ron Kalish
- Music by: Ole Hoyer
- Production company: Panorama Film International
- Release date: January 22, 1988
- Running time: 101 minutes
- Countries: United Kingdom; United States
- Language: English
- Budget: $4.5 million

The Misfit Brigade is a 1987 American television film loosely based on Sven Hassel's novel Wheels of Terror. The film was released in some markets under that title.

== Plot ==
In 1943 Germany, a tank crew is searching for convicted soldiers assigned to penal battalions. They encounter a woman claiming her baby is trapped in a bomb-damaged building. Porta, Tiny, Stege, Old Man, and Sven discover she is referring to her cat. More wildly improbable situations follow, including Little Legionnaire beating Tiny in a fight, before they are sent to the Russian Front.

In their assault guns, Bertha I and Bertha II, they launch an attack on Soviet T-34s, each knocking out a Russian tank. Bertha II is hit by a self-propelled gun (SPG), and Bertha I is immobilized. The crews escape to German lines on foot, losing "Freckles" Fredericks who is killed by a shell.

After an escapade at a field brothel, the men are ordered on a mission to destroy a train hauling tanker cars of oil 160 kilometres behind enemy lines. The colonel says success will be rewarded with furloughs and promotion out of the penal unit. A fanatical Nazi intelligence officer is assigned to them and they sneak into a Russian barracks and take the enemy's uniforms, weapons, and explosives. A fight ensues with a Russian feigning death; Porta is attacked, Seigfried is mortally wounded, the SS sergeant and the Russian kill each other. The next day they capture a Russian tank after killing the crew.

When they stop to wait for a thick fog to clear a Russian patrol spots them and forces them to continue, blundering into mine field and abandoning the tank. They continue on foot through a swamp, encountering two German deserters who take them to a co-ed group of Russian deserters at an abandoned mill. Porta and Old Man debate completing the mission or deserting and decide to continue, leaving the deserters behind.

The train station is being guarded by an unexpectedly large garrison, but the men overcome key guard posts and set fuzes to the charges. The Russian commander, unable to contact the sentries, sends a soldier to check. Tiny is nearly detected but the others kill the Russians sent to investigate. The train comes in on a different track, and Muller is killed trying to blow it with a hand grenade. Porta and Tiny chase the train in an automobile and destroy it with dynamite and a grenade.

The survivors return to the penal unit, assigned back to tanks. The Captain, presumed dead, arrives at a medal presentation wounded and missing an eye. The squad receives Iron Crosses and Colonel von Weisshagen is promoted and presented the German Cross in Gold. When the Old Man reminds him of his promise of furlough, von Weisshagen tells them they're going to demolition training and back to the Eastern Front. They react poorly to the news, and General von Grathwohl threatens them with court-martial for insubordination. An air attack interrupts, and the general and colonel try to escape on the general's plane but the pilot has been killed. The squad follows them, forms a line, and executes the officers as the closing theme plays.

== Cast ==
- Bruce Davison as Corporal Joseph Porta
- D. W. Moffett as Captain Erich von Barring
- Keith Szarabajka as Sergeant Wilhelm "Old Man" Beier
- David Patrick Kelly as Corporal Alfred "Little Legionnaire" Kalb
- Jay O. Sanders as Lance Corporal Wolfgang "Tiny" Creutzfeldt
- Branko Vidakovic as Lance Corporal Hugo Stege
- Slavko Štimac as Sven Hassel
- David Carradine as Colonel von Weisshagen
- Oliver Reed as General von Grathwohl

== Production ==
The film was produced under the working title Wheels of Terror and was shot in Yugoslavia. In Australia the DVD was released under the title Wheels of Terror.

== Reception ==
The film has been described as "a German Dirty Dozen", due to its story of military prisoners forced on a suicide mission deep behind enemy lines.

== Sequel ==
The producers intended to produce a sequel tentatively titled Bloody Road To Death which was ultimately never made.
