= Babette's Feast =

1987 film by Gabriel Axel

- Theatrical release poster
- Danish: Babettes Gæstebud
- Directed by: Gabriel Axel
- Screenplay by: Gabriel Axel
- Based on: "Babette's Feast" (1958 story) by Isak Dinesen
- Produced by: Just Betzer; Bo Christensen; Benni Korzen; Pernille Siesbye
- Starring: Stephane Audran; Birgitte Federspiel; Bodil Kjer; Jarl Kulle; Vibeke Hastrup; Jean-Philippe Lafont; Ghita Nørby
- Cinematography: Henning Kristiansen
- Edited by: Finn Henriksen
- Music by: Per Nørgård
- Production company: Panorama Film; Nordisk Film; Danish Film Institute
- Distributed by: Nordisk Film (Denmark)
- Release date: 28 August 1987
- Running time: 102 minutes
- Country: Denmark
- Languages: Danish; Swedish; French
- Box office: $4.4 million (US)

Babette's Feast (Danish: Babettes Gæstebud) is a 1987 Danish period drama film written and directed by Gabriel Axel, adapted from the 1958 short story by Karen Blixen (under the pen name 'Isak Dinesen'). It stars Stéphane Audran, Birgitte Federspiel, Bodil Kjer, Jarl Kulle, Vibeke Hastrup, and Jean-Philippe Lafont.

The film premiered in the Un Certain Regard section of the 1987 Cannes Film Festival, and received the Prize of the Ecumenical Jury. Babette's Feast was met with widespread critical acclaim and became the first Danish film to win the Oscar for Best Foreign Language Film. It received numerous accolades, including the BAFTA Award for Best Film Not in the English Language (out of six total nominations),

== Plot ==
The elderly and pious Protestant sisters Martine and Filippa live in a small village on the remote western coast of Jutland in 19th-century Denmark. Their late father was a pastor who founded his own Pietistic conventicle. Lacking new converts, the aging sisters preside over a dwindling, elderly congregation.

Forty-nine years before, the sisters had many suitors, but their father rejected them, to retain the women’s assistance with his pastoral mission. Martine was courted by a young Swedish cavalry officer, Lorens Löwenhielm, who was visiting Jutland. Filippa was courted by the famous baritone Achille Papin, on hiatus from the Paris Opera. Both sisters spurned their suitors and stayed with their father.

Thirty-five years later, a Frenchwoman, Babette Hersant, appears at their door. She carries a letter from Papin which explains that she is a refugee from counter-revolutionary bloodshed in Paris and recommends her as a housekeeper. The sisters cannot afford to employ Babette, but she begs to work for free. Babette serves as their cook for the next fourteen years, producing improved versions of the bland meals typical of the abstemious nature of the congregation and gaining their respect, and that of the other locals. As the years go by, the sisters are deeply distressed by the increasing number of disputes between the congregants. Babette is also troubled, and at one point, interrupts the arguments with a stern rebuke.

Babette's only link to her former life is a lottery ticket, which a Parisian friend annually renews. One day, she wins the lottery and receives 10,000 francs. After her win she decides to prepare a dinner for the sisters and their small congregation on the occasion of the founding pastor's hundredth birthday. More than just a feast, the meal is an outpouring of Babette's appreciation, an act of self-sacrifice.

The sisters accept both Babette's meal and her offer to pay for the creation of a "real French dinner." Babette arranges for her nephew to go to Paris and gather the supplies for the feast. The ingredients are plentiful, sumptuous and exotic, and their arrival causes much consternation and discussion among the villagers. As the various never-before-seen ingredients arrive and preparations commence, the sisters begin to worry that the meal will become a sin of sensual luxury, if not some form of devilry. In a hasty conference, the sisters and the congregation agree to eat the meal, but to forgo speaking of any pleasure in it and to make no mention of the food during the dinner.

Martine's former suitor, Lorens, now a famous general married to a member of the entourage of Queen Louise, comes as the guest of his aunt, the local lady of the manor and a member of the old pastor's congregation. He is unaware of the other guests' austere plans and as a man of the world and former attaché in Paris, he is the only person at the table qualified to comment on the meal. He regales the guests with abundant information about the extraordinary food and drink, comparing it to a meal he enjoyed years earlier at the famous Café Anglais in Paris. Although the other celebrants refuse to comment on the earthly pleasures of their meal, Babette's gifts break down their distrust and superstitions, elevating them physically and spiritually. Old wrongs are forgiven, ancient loves are rekindled and a mystical redemption of the human spirit settles over the table.

Bereft, the sisters assume that Babette will return to Paris. However, when she says that all of her money is gone and that she is not going anywhere, the sisters are aghast. Babette then reveals that she was formerly the head chef of the Café Anglais, where a dinner for twelve cost 10,000 francs. Martine tearfully says, "Now you will be poor the rest of your life", to which Babette replies, "An artist is never poor." Filippa then says: "But this is not the end, Babette. In paradise you will be the great artist God meant you to be" and then embraces her with tears in her eyes saying: "Oh, how you will enchant the angels!"

=== Menu ===
The seven-course menu in the film consisted of:

- "Potage à la Tortue" (turtle soup) served with Amontillado sherry
- "Blinis Demidoff" (buckwheat pancakes with caviar and sour cream) served with Veuve Clicquot Champagne
- "Cailles en Sarcophage" (quail in puff pastry shell with foie gras and truffle sauce) served with Clos de Vougeot Pinot Noir
- An endive salad
- Assorted cheeses and fruits served with Sauternes
- "Savarin au Rhum avec des Figues et Fruit Glacée" (rum sponge cake with figs and candied cherries) served with Champagne
- Coffee with vieux marc Grande Champagne cognac.

== Cast ==
- Stéphane Audran as Babette Hersant
- Bodil Kjer as Filippa
  - Hanne Stensgaard as young Filippa
- Birgitte Federspiel as Martine
  - Vibeke Hastrup as young Martine
- Jarl Kulle as General Lorens Löwenhielm
  - Gudmar Wivesson as young Löwenhielm
- Jean-Philippe Lafont as Achille Papin
- Pouel Kern as the Pastor
- Bibi Andersson as Swedish courtier
- Bendt Rothe as Nielsen
- Cay Kristiansen as Poul
- Lisbeth Movin as the Widow
- Preben Lerdorff Rye as the Captain
- Ebbe Rode as Christopher
- Else Petersen as Solveig
- Asta Esper Andersen as Anna
- Holger Perfort as Karlsen
- Ebba With as Löwenhielm's aunt
- Axel Strøbye as Löwenhielm's coachman
- Finn Nielsen as Grocer
- Ghita Nørby as the narrator (voice)

Bodil Kjer's singing voice was dubbed by soprano Tina Kiberg.

== Production ==
The film was produced by Just Betzer, Bo Christensen and Benni Korzen, with funding from the Danish Film Institute. It was the first Danish film of a Blixen story.

Blixen's original story takes place in a Norwegian village called Berlevåg, which coincidentally shares its name with the port village of Berlevåg, which has multi-coloured wooden houses on a long fjord. However, when Axel researched locations in Norway, he found the settings were too idyllic and resembled a "beautiful tourist brochure". He shifted the location to the flat windswept coast of western Jutland and asked his set designer, Sven Wichmann, to build a small grey village offering very few or no attractions. Mårup Church, a plain Romanesque church built around 1250 on a remote seaside cliff near the village of Lønstrup, was used as a backdrop. Somewhat ironically, the actual village of Berlevåg is not on a fjord, but directly on the Barents Sea, and is subject to strong winds—very much similar to Axel's vision.

Axel altered the setting from a ship-filled harbor to fishermen's rowboats on a beach. He said the changes would highlight Blixen's vision of Babette's life in near complete exile.

There is a lot that works in writing, but when translated to pictures, it doesn't give at all the same impression or feeling. All the changes I undertook, I did to actually be faithful to Karen Blixen. – Gabriel Axel

The Nordisk Film production company suggested the cast of Babette's Feast should include only Danish actors to reduce production costs. However, Axel wanted Danish, Swedish and French actors to play the roles for the sake of authenticity. Axel was supported by the Danish Film Institute's consultant, Claes Kastholm Hansen, who also agreed the cast should include international stars. The title character of Babette was initially offered to Catherine Deneuve. Deneuve was interested in the part but was concerned because she had been criticized in her past attempts to depart from her usual ‘sophisticated woman’ roles. While Deneuve deliberated for a day, Axel met with French actress Stéphane Audran. Axel remembered Audran from her roles in Claude Chabrol's films Violette Nozière (1978) and Cop au Vin (1985). When Axel asked Chabrol (her former husband) about Audran's suitability, Chabrol said Audran was the archetype of Babette. Axel gave the script to Audran, told her that Deneuve was contemplating the role, and asked her if she might be able to respond before the next day. Audran called two hours later and said she wanted the role. The following day, Deneuve declined and Audran was officially cast.

Two other major parts were the characters of the elderly maiden sisters, Phillipa and Martine. Phillipa, the once-promising singer, was portrayed by Bodil Kjer, considered the first lady of Danish theater and namesake of the Bodil Award. Birgitte Federspiel, best known for Carl Dreyer's 1955 classic film Ordet, was cast as the staid, lovelorn Martine.

The role of the Swedish General Lorens Löwenhielm, the former suitor of Martine, was accepted by Jarl Kulle and the Swedish Court Lady by Bibi Andersson. Both had achieved international recognition as two of Ingmar Bergman's favorite actors, appearing in many of his films.

The group of elderly villagers was composed of Danish actors, many of whom were well known for their roles in the films of Carl Theodor Dreyer. These included Lisbeth Movin as the Old Widow, Preben Lerdorff Rye as the Captain, Axel Strøbye as the Driver, Bendt Rothe as Old Nielsen and Ebbe Rode as Christopher.

The popular Danish actress Ghita Nørby was cast as the film's narrator. Although production consultants complained to Axel that the use of a narrator was too old-fashioned, Axel was adamant about using one. He said it was not about being old-fashioned but only about the need: "If there is need for a narrator, then one uses one."

== Reception ==
=== Critical response ===
Upon its release in 1987, Babette's Feast received widespread positive reviews. It maintained a 97% "Fresh" rating as of 2024 on Rotten Tomatoes based on 34 reviews, and an average score of 8.5/10. The site's consensus is; "Charming and melancholy, Babette's Feast is a timeless Scandinavian treat that explores the complex relationships between people, beliefs, and what it means to be an artist." The film also has a weighted average score of 78 out of 100 at Metacritic based on reviews from 18 critics, indicating "generally favorable reviews". After the film's release, several restaurants offered recreations of the film's menu.

The movie is a favorite of Alton Brown, Pope Francis, Rowan Williams, Richard Gere, and Stanley Tucci. The film was included by the Vatican in a list of important films compiled in 1995, under the category of "Religion".

=== Awards and nominations ===
| Institution | Year | Category | Nominee | Result |
|---|---|---|---|---|
| Academy Awards | 1988 | Best Foreign Language Film | | Won |
| Belgian Film Critics Association | 1989 | Grand Prix | Gabriel Axel | Nominated |
| British Academy Film Awards | 1989 | Best Film | Just Betzer, Bo Christensen | Nominated |
| British Academy Film Awards | 1989 | Best Film Not in the English Language | Just Betzer, Bo Christensen, Gabriel Axel | Won |
| British Academy Film Awards | 1989 | Best Direction | Gabriel Axel | Nominated |
| British Academy Film Awards | 1989 | Best Adapted Screenplay | Gabriel Axel | Nominated |
| British Academy Film Awards | 1989 | Best Actress in a Leading Role | Stéphane Audran | Nominated |
| British Academy Film Awards | 1989 | Best Cinematography | Henning Kristiansen | Nominated |
| Cannes Film Festival | 1987 | Palme d'Or | Gabriel Axel | Nominated |
| Cannes Film Festival | 1987 | Prize of the Ecumenical Jury | Gabriel Axel | Won |
| César Awards | 1989 | Best European Film | Gabriel Axel | Nominated |
| Golden Globes | 1989 | Best Motion Picture – Non-English Language | | Nominated |
| London Film Critics' Circle | 1989 | Actor of the Year | Stéphane Audran | Won (Note: Tied with Leo McKern.) |
| London Film Critics' Circle | 1989 | Foreign Language Film of the Year | | Won |
| Nastro d'Argento | 1989 | Best Foreign Director | Gabriel Axel | Nominated |
| Nastro d'Argento | 1989 | Best Foreign Actress | Stéphane Audran | Won (Note: Tied with Cher.) |
| Robert Awards | 1988 | Best Actress in a Leading Role | Stéphane Audran | Won |
| Rouen Nordic Film Festival | 1988 | Grand Jury Prize | Gabriel Axel | Won |
| Rouen Nordic Film Festival | 1988 | Audience Award | Gabriel Axel | Won |
| Silver Condor Awards | 1990 | Best Foreign Film | Gabriel Axel | Won |

== Home media ==
Babette's Feast was released on DVD by MGM on January 23, 2001, presented in its original 1.85:1 widescreen aspect ratio. The only special feature was the original theatrical trailer.

On July 23, 2013, the film was released by The Criterion Collection on DVD and Blu-ray. The Blu-ray has a new, restored high-definition digital transfer, and features new video interviews with star Stéphane Audran, sociologist Priscilla Parkhurst Ferguson, and a 1995 documentary about author Karen Blixen, as well as a booklet featuring an essay by film scholar Mark Le Fanu and Dinesen's 1950 story.

== Potential remake ==
In December 2019, it was announced that Alexander Payne had been asked to direct an American remake of the film. Payne's version was planned to be set in Minnesota.

== See also ==
- List of submissions to the 60th Academy Awards for Best Foreign Language Film
- List of Danish submissions for the Academy Award for Best Foreign Language Film
