= Jean-Philippe Lafont =

French baritone (born 1951)

Jean-Philippe Lafont (born 11 February 1951) is a French baritone. He studied in his native city of Toulouse and later at the Opéra-Studio in Paris. He made his operatic debut as Papageno in The Magic Flute at the Salle Favart, Paris in 1974. He went on to appear regularly in Toulouse, where he first played the title role in Verdi's Falstaff in 1987.

== Career ==
Lafont has performed at the Opéra-Comique in Paris, Carnegie Hall and the Metropolitan Opera in New York, La Scala in Milan and the Royal Opera House, London. Among the roles with which he is particularly associated are the four villains in The Tales of Hoffmann, the Comte des Grieux in Manon, Golaud in Pelléas et Mélisande, Barak in Die Frau ohne Schatten and the title roles in Gianni Schicchi, Rigoletto, Boris Godunov and Macbeth.

His discography includes:

- Auber: La muette de Portici
- Berlioz: La damnation de Faust
- Bizet: Djamileh
- Debussy: La chute de la maison Usher
- Escaich: Claude (opera)
- Gluck: Les pèlerins de la Mecque
- Gounod: St. Cecilia Mass
- Offenbach: La belle Hélène
- Offenbach: Mesdames de la Halle
- Offenbach: M. Choufleuri restera chez lui le . . .
- Offenbach: Pomme d'api
- Salieri: Les Danaïdes
- Salieri: Tarare
- Verdi: Falstaff

== Filmography ==
- 1984 Carmen (Dancaïre)
- 1985 Parole de flic (Ranko)
- 1987 Babette's Feast (Achille Papin)

as well as French television J'étais à Nüremberg (2011), La Guerre du Royal Palace (2012) and Ceux de 14 (2014)
