= Harald Lønborg-Jensen =

Danish architect

- Born: 10 October 1871; Tureby, Denmark
- Died: 1 November 1948 (aged 77); Copenhagen, Denmark
- Education: Royal Danish Academy of Fine Arts
- Occupation: Architect

Harald Magnus Lønborg-Jensen (10 October 1871 – 1 November 1941) was a Danish architect known as a productive church and restoration-architect.

== Biography ==
Harald Lønborg-Jensen was born at Rødemarkshus near Tureby on the island of Zealand, Denmark. He was trained as a carpenter by his father Fritz Julius Jensen who worked as a building constructor. Lønborg-Jensen later attended technical school, and further attended the Royal Danish Academy of Fine Arts from where he graduated with a degree in architecture in 1900. He was awarded the Theophilus Hansens Legat, using the funding to travel in Austria, Italy, France, Belgium, the Netherlands in 1904. He also received the Academy's scholarship with which he traveled in Germany, Italy, Greece during 1907-08.

He subsequently found employment at various architect practices and worked for among others Vilhelm Dahlerup, Anton Rosen, Hans J. Holm, Ferdinand Meldahl and Martin Borch before he started his owchitectural practice. Harald Lønborg-Jensens expertise became church buildings. Through four decades he was one of the most used architects for designs of new churches and for restoration. His style was inspired by historical-romantic themes.

He exhibited at the Charlottenborg Spring Exhibition in 1905–07 and 1909, was a member of the Royal Nordic Society of Antiquaries, was on the board of Selskabet for kirkelig Kunst and was a member of Akademiraadet 1931–34. He was an architect at Ribe Cathedral from 1915 and at Roskilde Cathedral from 1927.

== Personal life ==
In 1926 Lønborg-Jensen was made a knight in the Order of the Dannebrog. Lønborg-Jensen was married in Ebeltoft 1 October 1895 to Eline Inga Benedicte Jensen (1870-1939). He died in Copenhagen and was buried at Frederiksberg Older Cemetery.

== Works ==
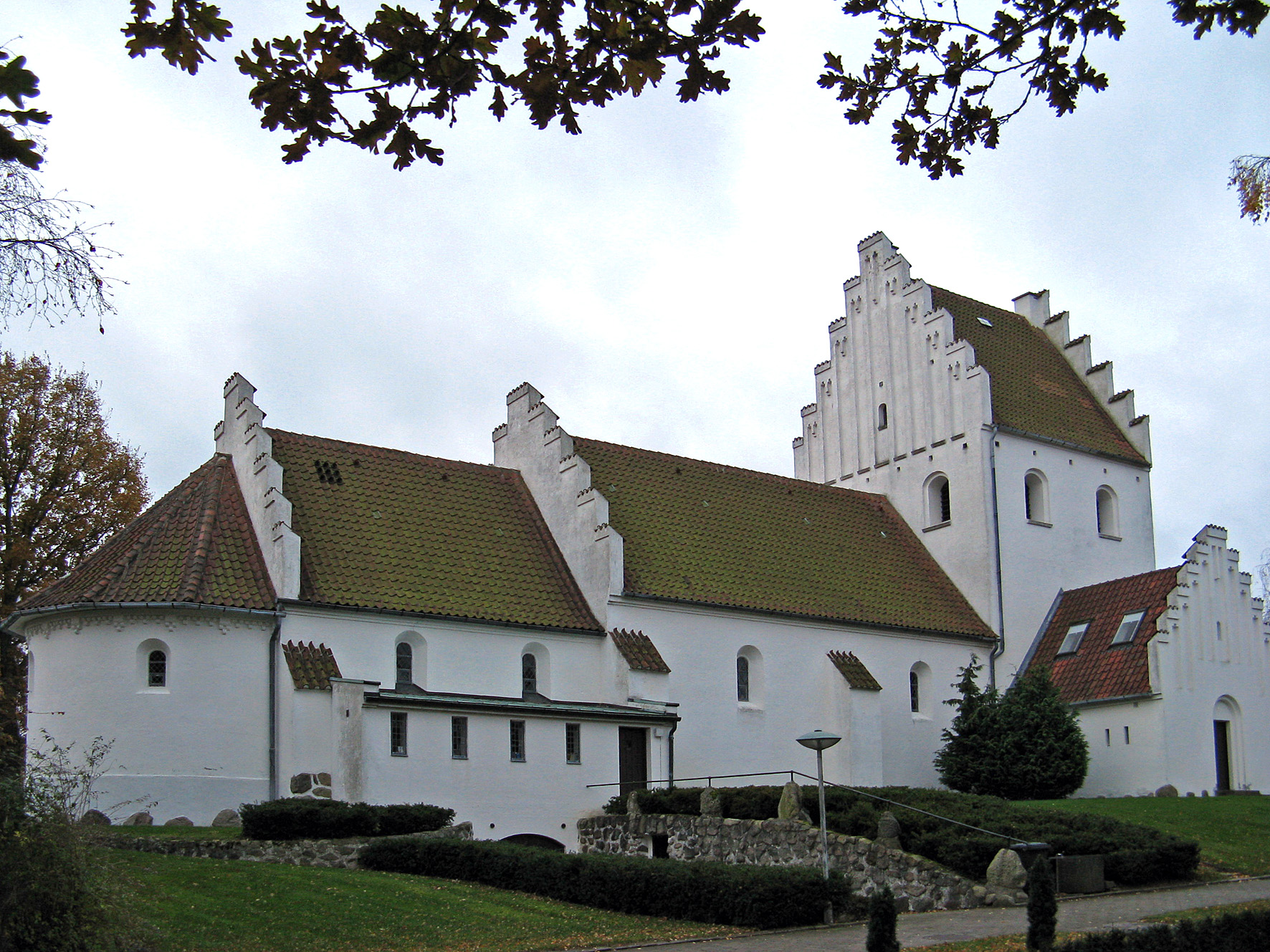
Frederik's Church

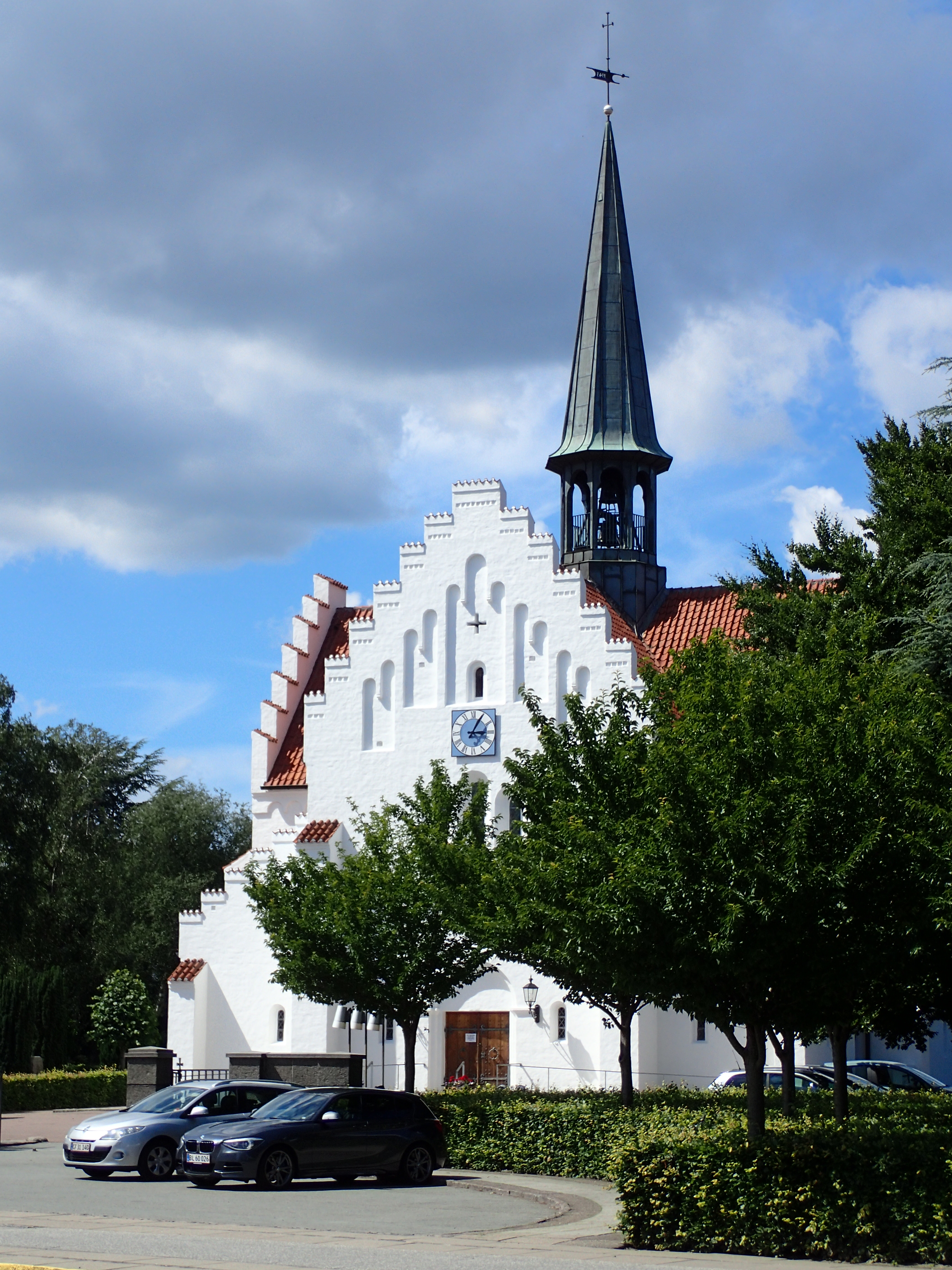
Åbyhøj Church

- Grundtvigs Højskole, Kongens Lyngby (1897, now Frilandsmuseet)
- Chapel, Sorgenfri Cemetery (1905)
- Stenderup Church (1908–09)
- Skovlund Church (1910)
- Bramminge Church (1912–15)
- Vendsyssel Bank (1913)
- North wing of Aunsbjerg Manor (1917–19)
- Haunstrup Church (1918–20)
- Studsgård Church (1918–20)
- Bjerringbro Church (1918–20)
- Lundtofte Church (1919–21)
- Skjoldbjerg Church (1919–21)
- Memorial on Vestre Cemetery, (1920)
- Grindsted Church (1921–23)
- Rinkenæs Church (1929–32)
- Nørre Kollund Church (1935)
- St. John's Church (1940–41)
- Frederik's Church (1942-44)
- Åbyhøj Church (1942–45)
