= Vibeke Hastrup =

Danish actress

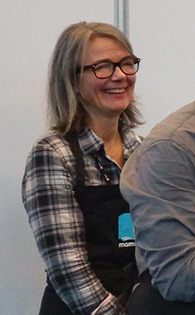
- Hastrup in 2012
- Born: 7 April 1958 (age 68); Vedersø, Ringkøbing-Skjern Municipality, Denmark
- Occupation: Actress
- Years active: 1982–present

Vibeke Hastrup (born 7 April 1958 in Denmark) is a Danish actress who works in theatre, television and film. She performed in the films Babette's Feast and Dance of the Polar Bears, and has done numerous voice-overs for animated features such as Tarzan, Robots and Wallace & Gromit: The Curse of the Were-Rabbit.

== Biography ==
Hastrup graduated from the Danish National School of Theatre in Copenhagen. The following year she debuted at Det Ny Teater in Copenhagen in the comedy Goddag, er De min Far? (English: Hello, are you my Father?). She has performed on many of the Copenhagen stages, including in Heksejagt and Parasitterne at the Folketeatret as well as Play It Again, Sam at the Bellevue and Det Danske Theaters.

Hastrup debuted on screen in 1982 in Sven Methling's Kidnapping. Five years later she played the role of the young Martina in Babette's Feast (Babettes gæstebud). Hastrup appeared in other films including Dance of the Polar Bears which won both Bodil and Robert awards for Best Danish Film of 1990. Hastrup also has appeared in 6 Danish television series and lent her voice to the Danish versions of Lady and the Tramp II, Toy Story 2, and Tarzan.

== Filmography ==
=== Films ===
Year	Film	Role	Other notes
1982	Kidnapping	Nanny	
1987	Babettes gæstebud (Babette's Feast)	Young Martina	
1988	Ved Vejen	Ida Abel	
1988	Guldregn	Postal Worker	
1988	Himmel og Helvede (Heaven and Hell)	Lillian	
1990	Lad isbjørnene danse (Dance of the Polar Bears)	Tina's Mother	
1997	Sunes Familie	Mother	
1999	Toy Story 2		
1999	Tarzan		
2000	Ved Verdens End (At the End of the World)		
2001	Lady og vagabonden II (Lady and the Tramp II: Scamp's Adventure)		
2002	Bertram & Co.	Mother	
2005	Drabet (Manslaughter)	Jette	
2005	Sommerfuglekvinden (The Butterfly Woman)	Elisabeth	
2006	Krummerne – så er det jul igen (The Crumbs – A Very Crumby Christmas)	Mother Crumb	
2007	Vikaren (The Substitute)	Albert's Mother	
2007	Noget for Noget (Quid Pro Quo)	Police Officer	
2008	What No One Knows (What No One Knows)	Mrs. Lange-Erichsen	
2009	The Escape	Hanne Hvidtfeldt	
2009	Velsignelsen	Dr. Dorthe	
2009	Headhunter	Lipreader	

=== Television ===
- Én stor familie (1982–1983)
- Gøngehøvdingen (1991–1992)
- Pas på mor (1998-1998)
- Brødrene Mortensens jul (1998–2002)
- Rejseholdet (2000–2003)
- Ørnen (2004)
- Forbrydelsen (2007)
