= Aaby, Aarhus =

Neighborhood in Aarhus Municipality, Denmark

Aaby
- Neighborhood
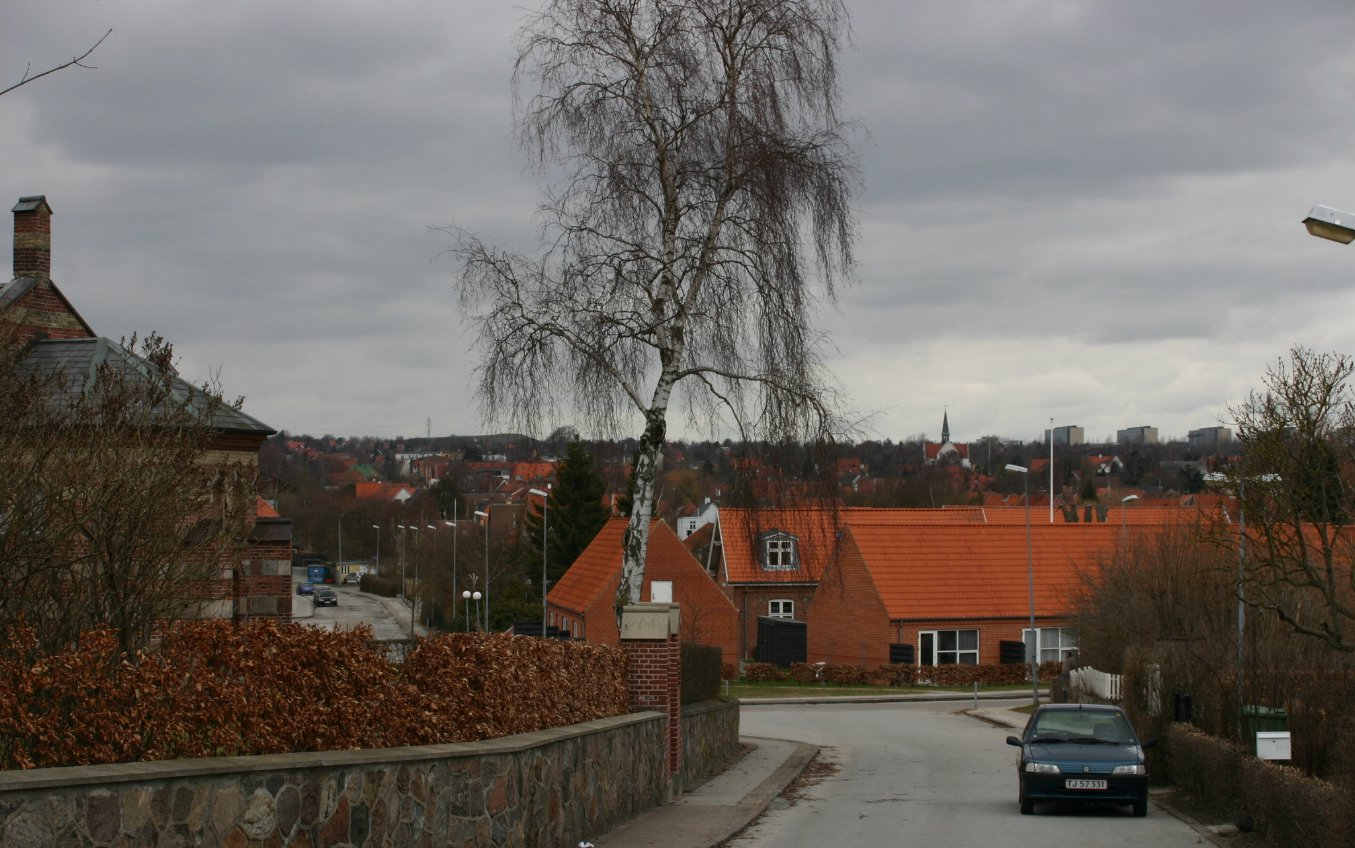

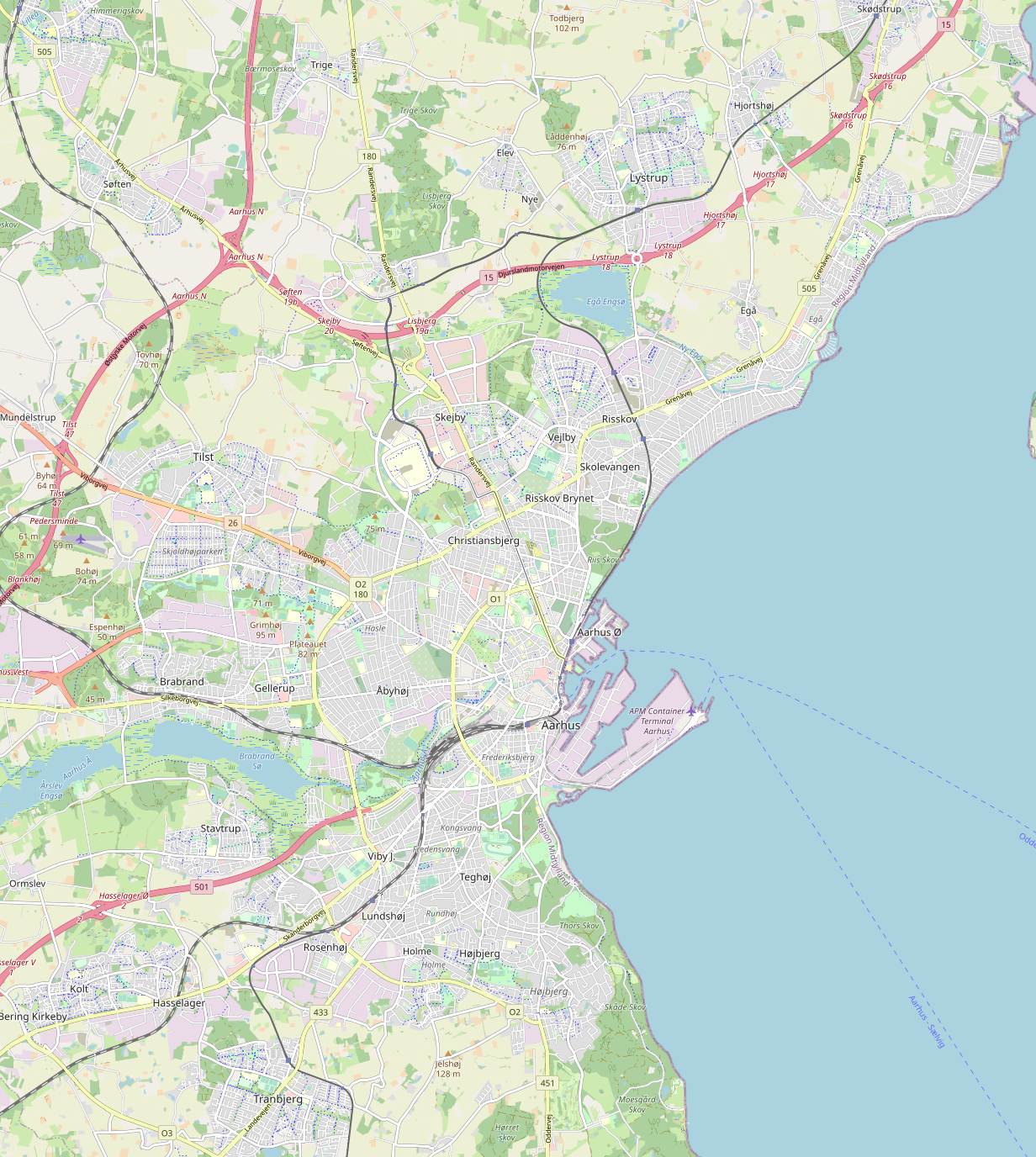
- Location within Aarhus
- Coordinates: 56.148303°N 10.164981°E
- Country: Denmark
- Regions of Denmark: Central Denmark Region
- Municipality: Aarhus Municipality
- District: Åbyhøj
- Postal code: 8230

Aaby, or Åby, is a suburban area of Aarhus in Denmark. Located 4 km from the city centre of Aarhus, Åby was originally an old village, but is now an integrated a part of Åbyhøj, that sprawled around it. To distinguish Åby from Åbyhøj, the village area is often referred to as Gammel Åby (lit.:Old Åby). Åby is situated at a bend of the Aarhus River and there is access to the river and the pathway of Brabrandstien from here.

== Etymology ==
The name Åby translates literally as river-town in modern Danish and it also derives from the Old Norse for "village on a river" (Old Norse á, river, and býr, village). Åby is identical in meaning with Aby in Lincolnshire in England.

== History ==
The town of Åby is very old and grew from a port that used to be here in the Viking Age, when Aarhus Å was a fjord. Over the years, the fjord sanded up and transformed into the narrow waterway we now know as Aarhus River. The usual village charm and characteristics are still clearly visible in Åby, especially around the church.

== Gallery ==
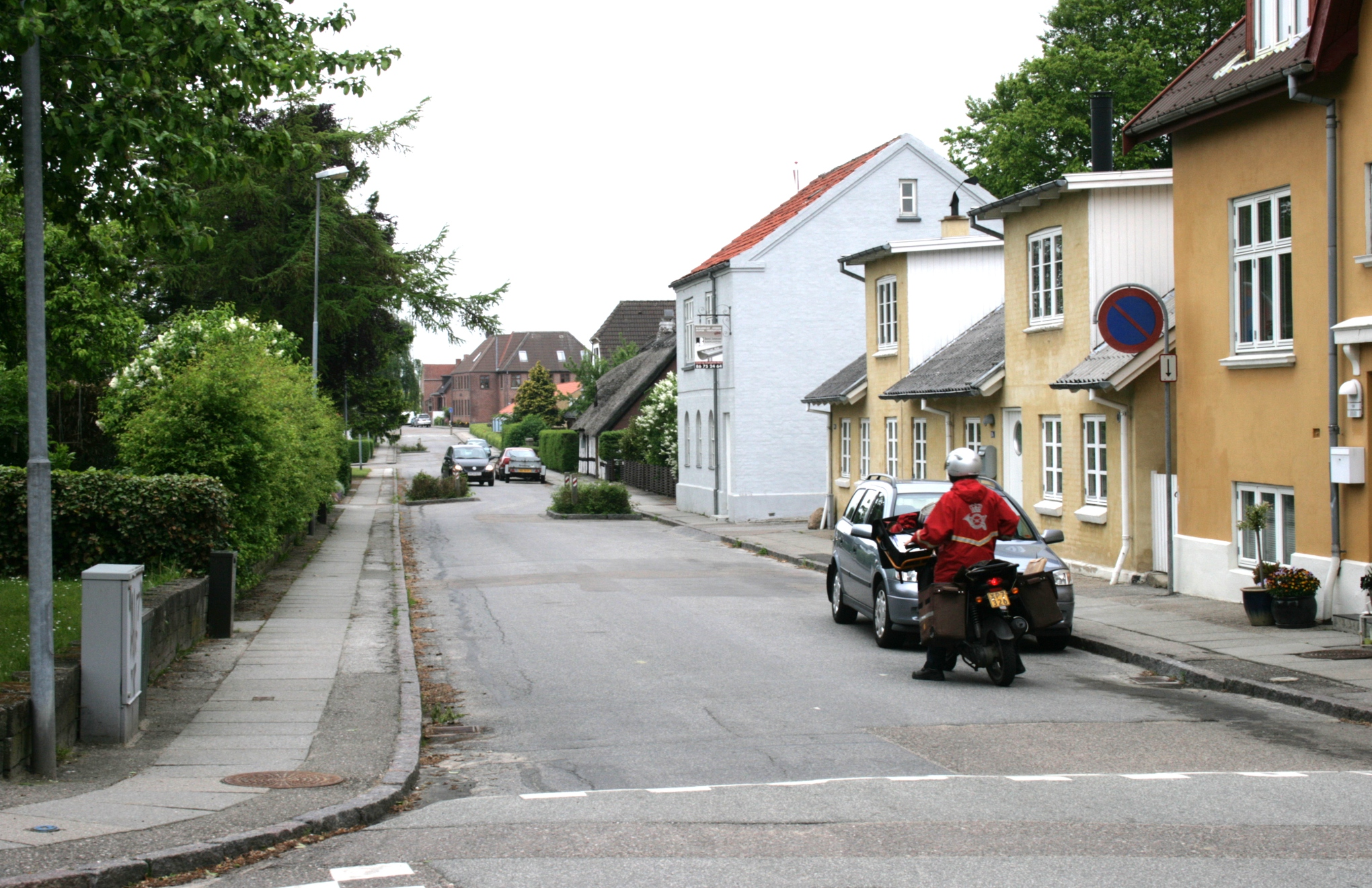

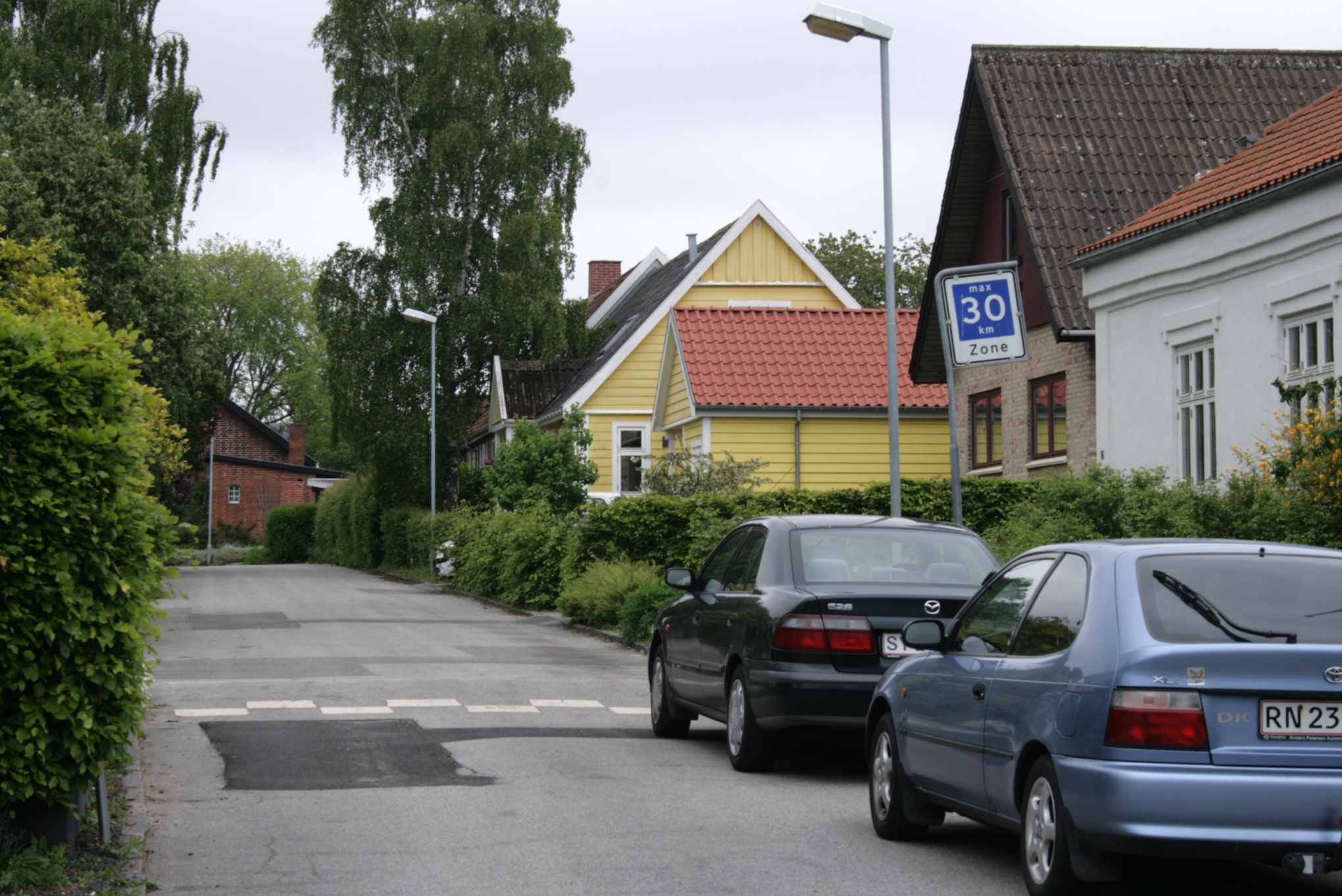

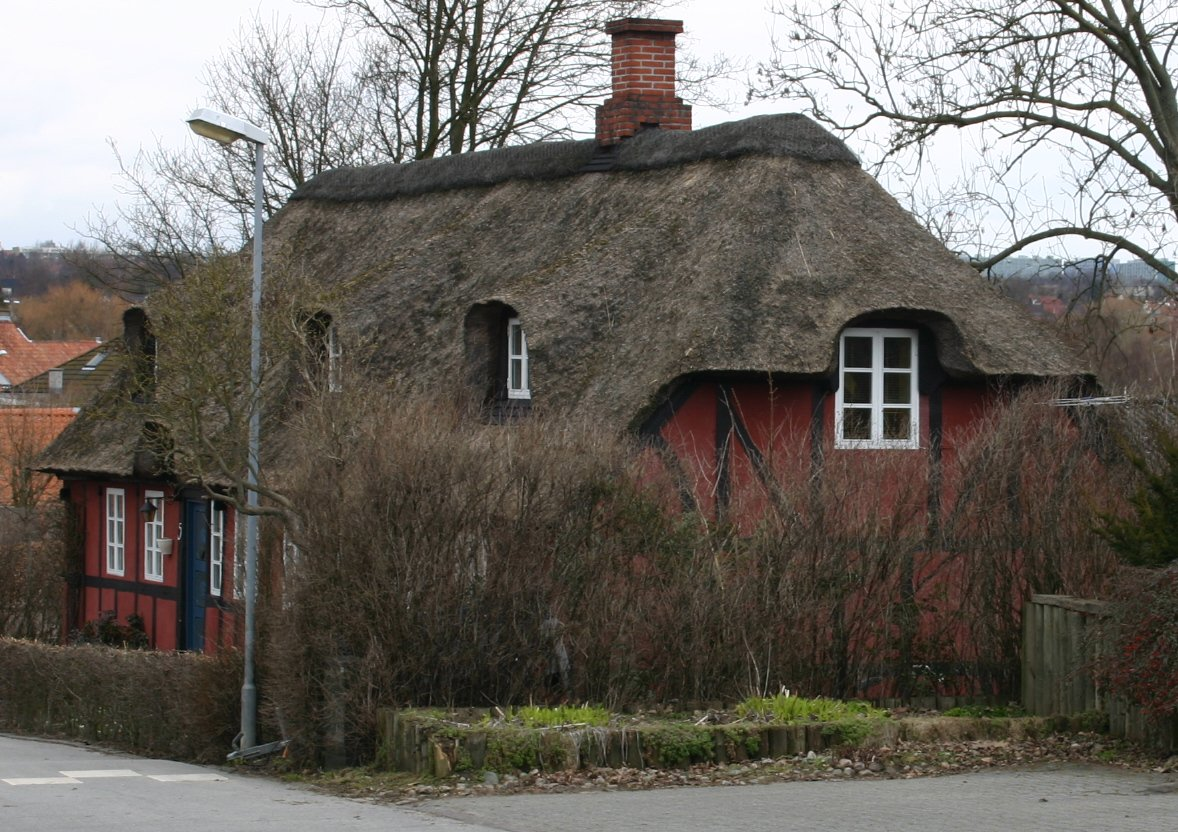

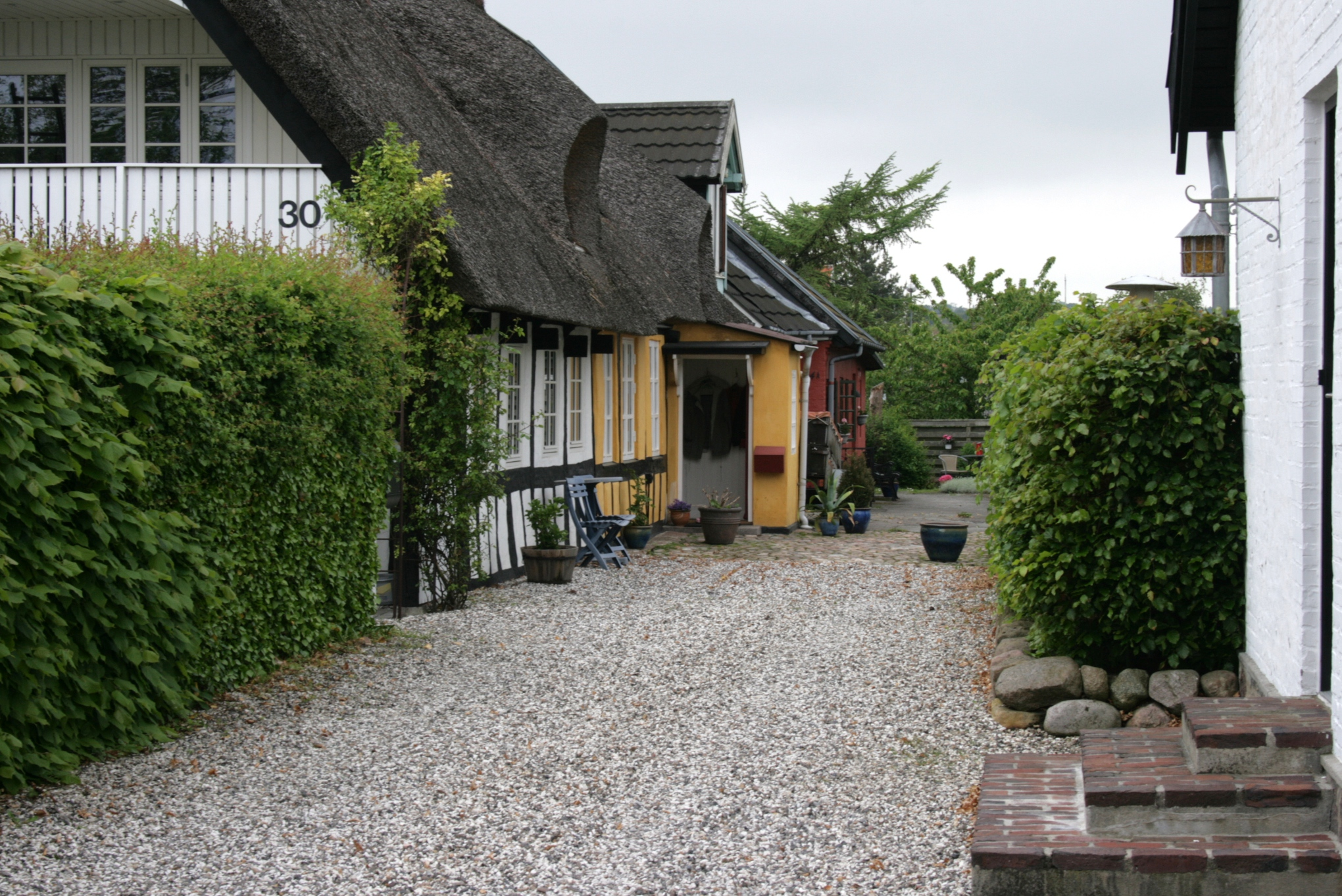

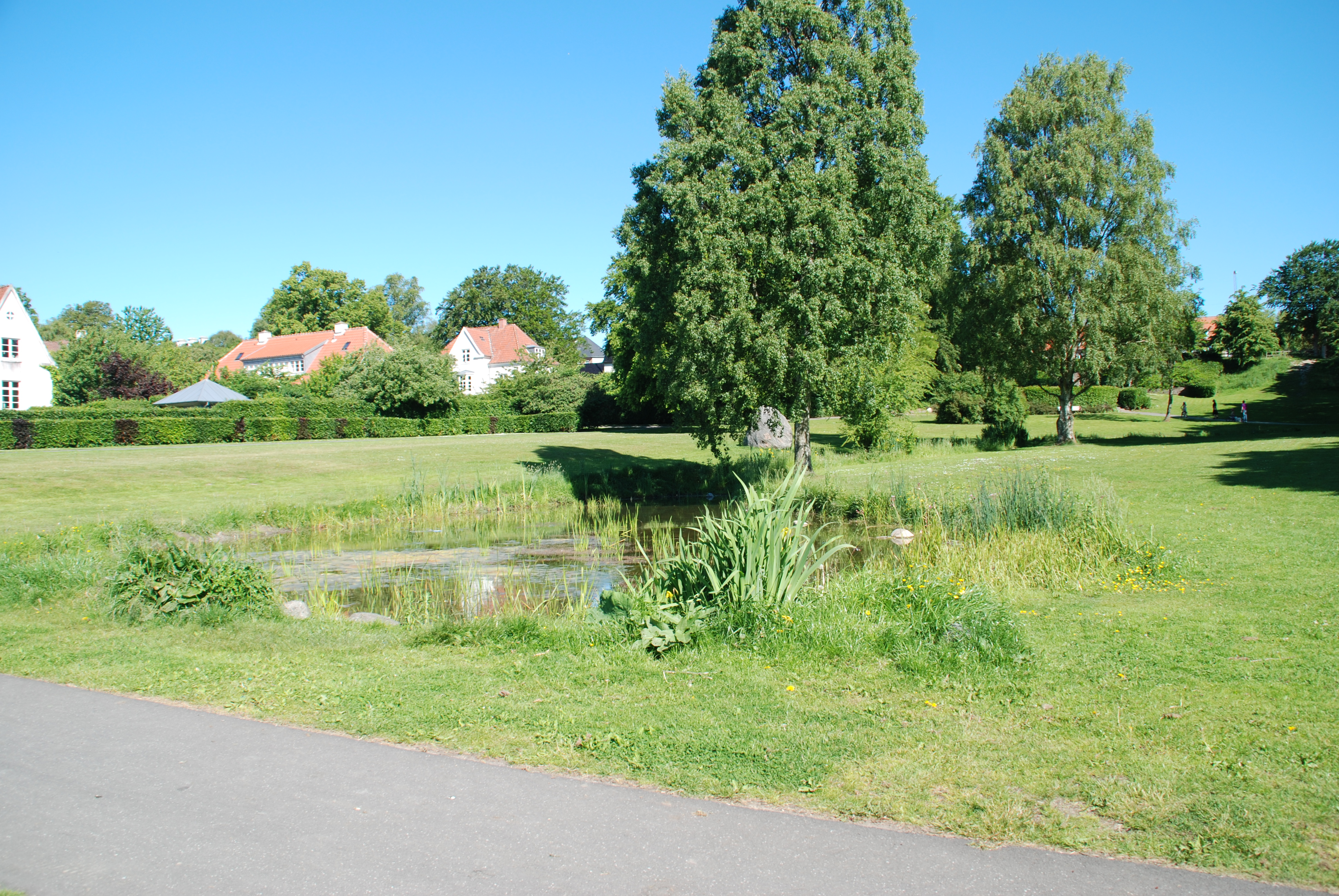
Åby Park

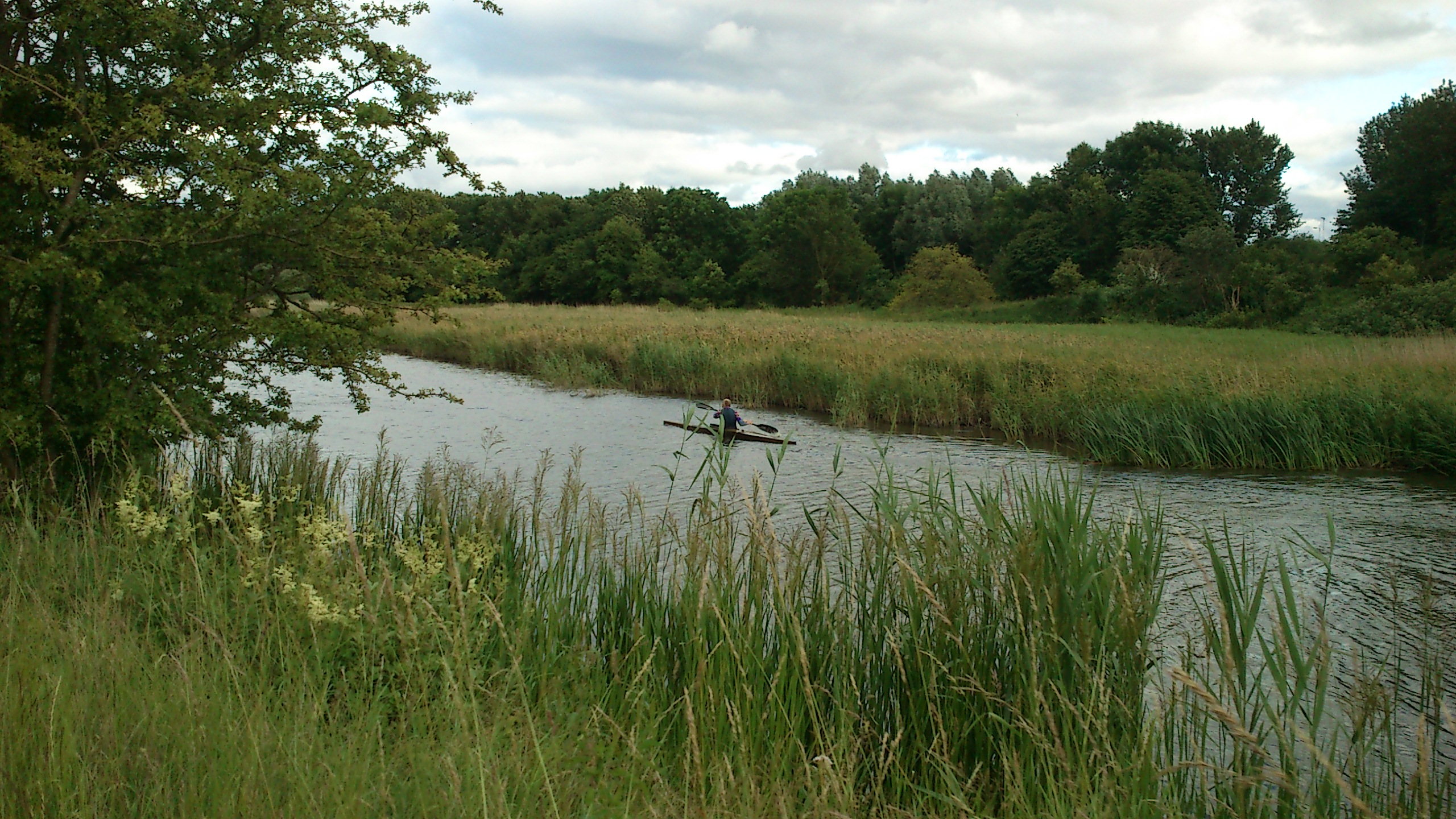
At Aarhus River and Brabrandstien.

== Sources ==
- Åby Kirke - Hasle Herred Nationalmuseet (in Danish)
  There is a map of the village around 1780 on p. 1451. Summary of the text in English.
- August F. Schmidt (1941–43): Aaby Sogns Historie (Hasle Herred), Vol. I-II. Volume I was self-published, Volume II was published by Aaby Kommune. (in Danish)
- Åby og Åbyhøj - Fra landsby til forstad, Aaby - Aabyhøj Lokalhistoriske Forening (Sep. 2002) (in Danish)
  Pamphlet published by the local-history association in Åby and Åbyhøj on the 100th year jubilee of Åbyhøj.
