= Men of Crisis: The Harvey Wallinger Story =

- Directed by: Woody Allen
- Written by: Woody Allen
- Produced by: Jack Kuney
- Starring: Woody Allen; Diane Keaton; Jean De Baer
- Narrated by: Reed Hadley
- Edited by: Eric Albertson
- Running time: 25 minutes
- Country: United States
- Language: English

Men of Crisis: The Harvey Wallinger Story is a short film directed by Woody Allen in 1971. It is a satirization of the Richard Nixon administration made in mockumentary style.

Allen plays Harvey Wallinger, a thinly disguised version of Henry Kissinger. The short was produced as a television special for PBS and was scheduled to air in February 1972, but it was pulled from the schedule shortly before its airdate, as PBS officials reportedly feared it would affect their government funding support. Allen, who had previously sworn off television work, cited it as an example of why he should "stick to movies". The special never aired, but it can now be viewed in The Paley Center for Media, and is often found on YouTube.

Two of Allen's regular leading ladies, Louise Lasser and Diane Keaton, make appearances, as does Richard Nixon-lookalike Richard M. Dixon. Actor Reed Hadley narrates. The fictional characters are interspersed with newsreel footage of Hubert Humphrey, Spiro Agnew and Nixon in embarrassing public moments. Allen later explored this style in his 1983 film Zelig.
