= Maslansky + Partners =

Communications consultancy in New York

maslansky + partners
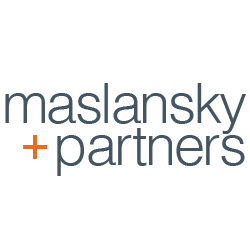
- Industry: Consulting, Communications, Research
- Founded: 1992; 33 years ago
- Headquarters: New York, New York, US
- Area served: Worldwide
- Key people: Michael Maslansky (CEO); Lee Hartley Carter (President)
- Parent: Omnicom Group Inc.
- Website: maslansky.com

maslansky + partners is a communications consultancy headquartered in New York, NY that focuses on the use of language. Their work has been used by non-profits within the disabilities community, the Republican Party, nonpartisan organizations, and corporations.

Firm CEO, Michael Maslansky (an author of The Language of Trust ), and firm President, Lee Hartley Carter (author of Persuasion - Convincing Others When Facts Don’t Seem to Matter ), are frequent commentators on Forbes, CNN, FOX News, Current TV, Entrepreneur, and others.

== History ==
m+p was founded by Frank Luntz and Michael Maslansky in 1992, after both served as pollsters for the Ross Perot presidential campaign. In 1994, the firm worked with U.S. House of Representatives Minority Leader Newt Gingrich to develop a messaging platform known as the Contract with America. In 2005, the firm was acquired by the Omnicom Group and has maintained a focus on nonpartisan messaging work with nonprofits and industries from pharma, to finance, to utilities, and others.

== Sources ==
- https://www.forbes.com/sites/krystledavis/2011/06/08/what-to-say-to-skeptics-using-the-language-of-trust/#1560feab29aa
- https://www.wsj.com/articles/an-alternative-investment-by-any-other-name-is-still-1439172115
- http://www.crains.com/if-i-knew-then/michael-maslansky/maslansky-partners
