= Åbyhøj Church =

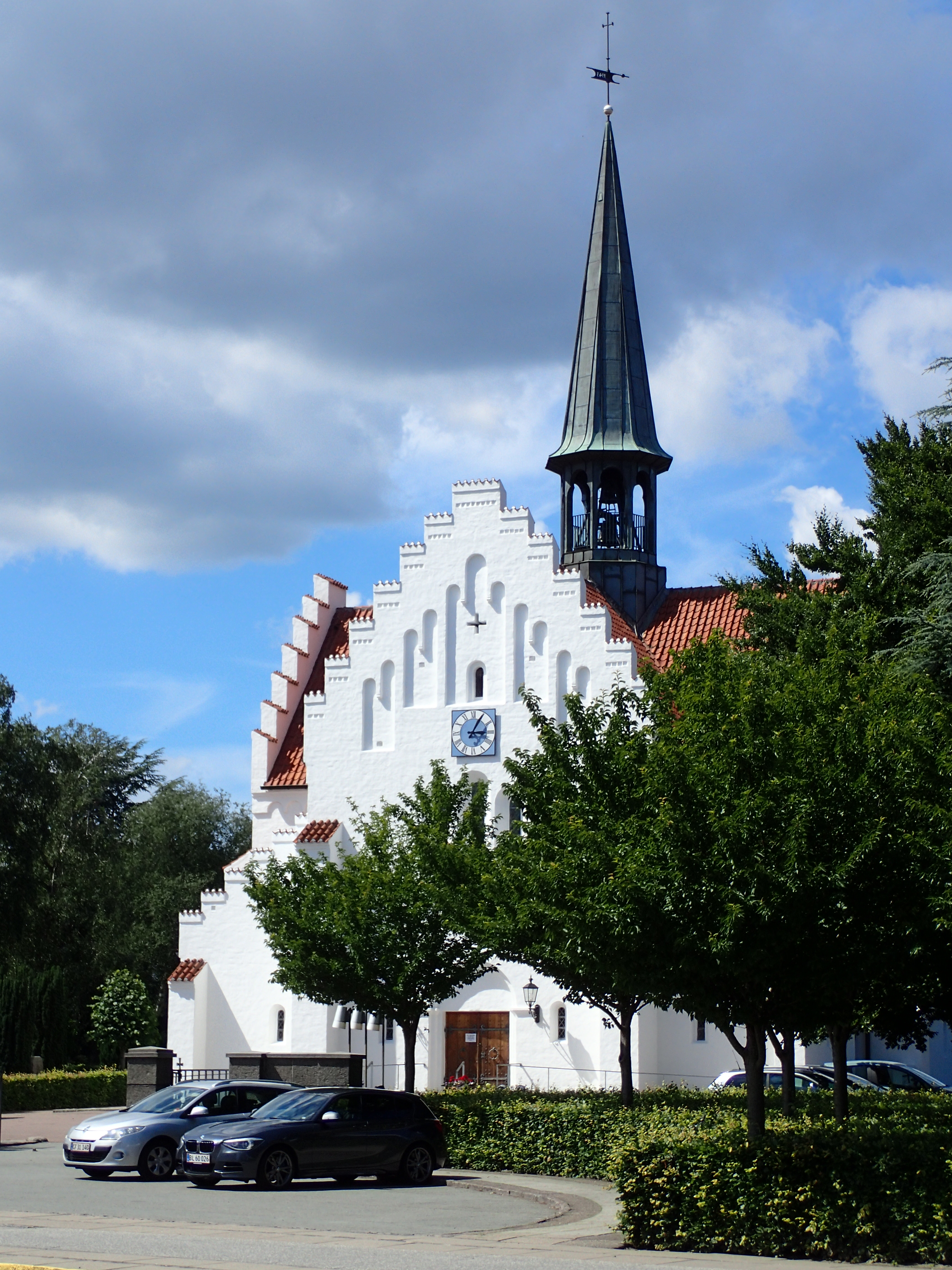
- Åbyhøj Church
- Åbyhøj Church
- 56.1551°N 10.1573°E
- Location: Silkeborgvej 290; 8230 Åbyhøj
- Country: Denmark
- Denomination: Church of Denmark

History
- Status: Church

Architecture
- Completed: 1945

Specifications
- Materials: Brick

Administration
- Archdiocese: Diocese of Aarhus

Åbyhøj Church (Danish: Skt. Åbyhøj Kirke) is a church in Aarhus, Denmark. The church is situated in the western Åbyhøj neighbourhood on Silkeborgvej. Åbyhøj Church is a parish church within the Church of Denmark, the Danish state church, under the Diocese of Aarhus. It is a parish church in the Åby Parish along with Åby Church and serves some 11.000 parish members.

The church was designed by the Danish architect Harald Lønborg-Jensen and inaugurated in 1945. The church is architecturally linked with a church in Løgumkloster from which Lønborg-Jensen drew inspiration. The original church spire featured a flèche but as construction took place during the Second World War there was a shortage of lead and copper which meant it could not be properly finished. In 1973 it suffered from rot and was replaced with a new and slimmer version. In the interior the altar faces north and is made of grey and yellow travertine and adorned with a gilded crucifix. Colors are kept discrete throughout the church and the floor is paved in red brick. In 1994 the church got a new organ and new windows in the choir.

The church has a cemetery which was inaugurated on 16 November 1927 with the first burial taking place December 23 of that year. The cemetery is divided around a system of paths which splits the cemetery into smaller units. The wide north-south path is the main axis of the cemetery with the church itself as the central element. Primary paths are paved while secondary are gravel.

== See also ==
- List of churches in Aarhus
