= Benni Korzen =

Danish film producer (1938–2026)

Benni Korzen (1 April 1938 – 15 February 2026) was a Danish film producer, best known for producing Babette's Feast (1987).

== Life and career ==
Born in Copenhagen, Denmark, Korzen won the Best Foreign Film Oscar for Babette's Feast in 1988. The producer also won the BAFTA Best Foreign Film award for Babette's Feast, the same year. Since moving to The United States from his native Denmark, Benni produced, line-produced or executive produced over 20 feature films on budgets ranging from under $1 million to over $15 million solely or in partnership with Just Betzer or New York City producers Rankin and Bass. In addition, Benni was the co-owner of Panorama Film International, New York City and served as the General Partner in two limited partnerships that produced 6 feature films distributed by New Line Cinema. Benni was developing two Off-Broadway hits into films, Forever Plaid, the musical written by Stuart Ross, and Beau Jest, the stage play written by James A. Sherman.

Korzen was married to actress Annie Korzen and had one child. Benni Korzen died on 15 February 2026, at the age of 87.

== Filmography ==
- Bushido Blade (1981)
