= Just Betzer =

Danish film producer

Just Betzer (11 June 1944 – 6 November 2003), was a Danish Oscar-winning film producer, born in Åbyhøj, Denmark.

Betzer began his career managing the candy concession and as an alternate projectionist at his father's theater in Aarhus, Denmark, in 1955. In 1960, Betzer founded Panorama Film production/distribution company in Denmark, which has since made over 30 feature films. He later opened a chain of 13 theatres throughout Denmark. In 1985, Betzer moved to England, and started the London-based company Panorama Film International with offices in Copenhagen, Denmark and Los Angeles, California.

In 1987, the film Babette's Feast, produced by Betzer, was released. Babette's Feast won the Academy Award for Best Foreign-Language Film, and the BAFTA Best Foreign Film award, in 1988. Two years later, he opened the Los Angeles–based production company, Just Betzer Films. His other films include Winterborn, Assassination, And You Thought Your Parents Were Weird, Nobody's Perfect, The Misfit Brigade, and the erotic The Girl in a Swing, with Meg Tilly. Betzer died from a coronary embolism at age 59 on 6 November 2003, in Lumsaas, Denmark.
