= Aabyhøj =

- Neighborhood
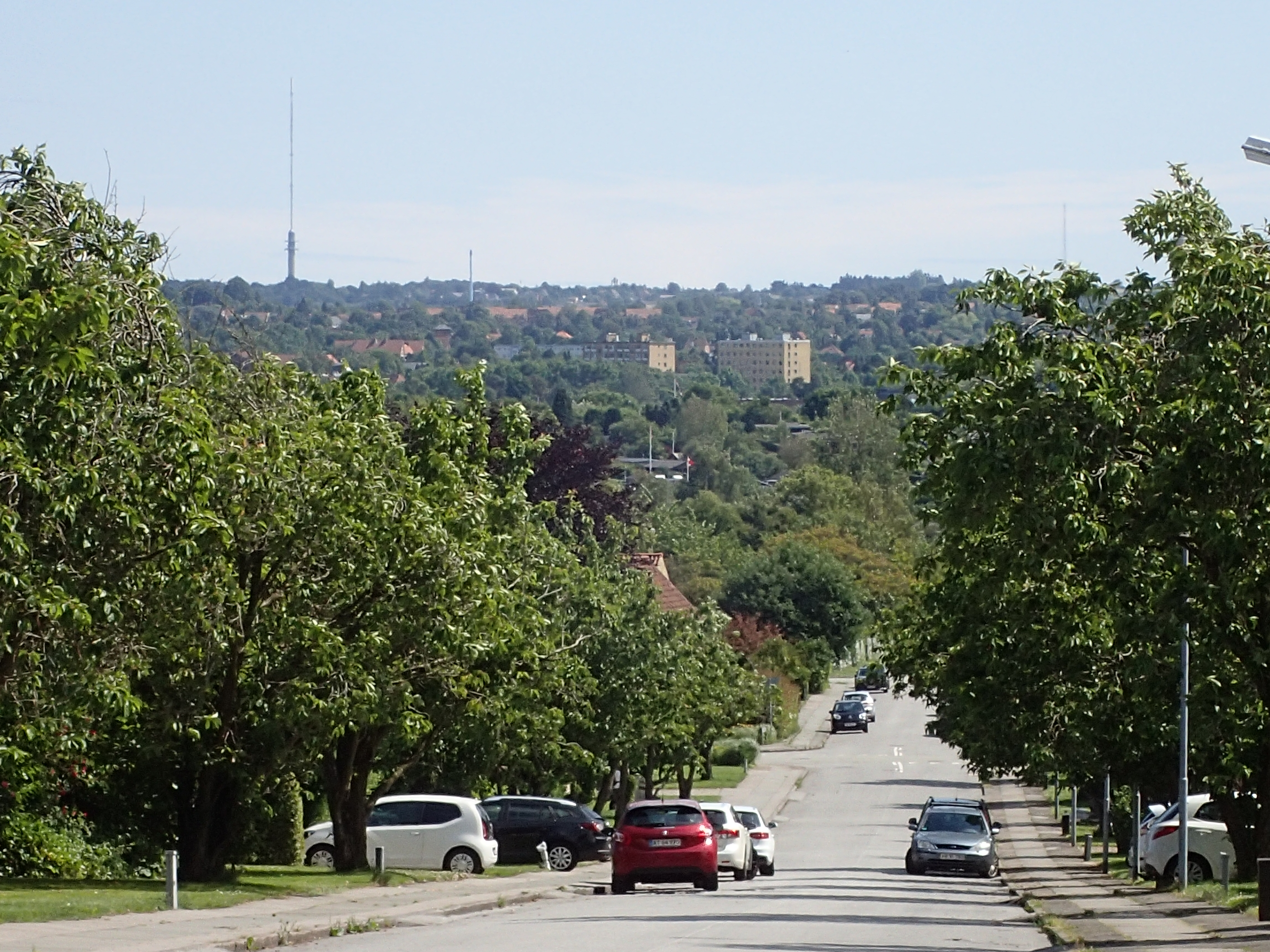
- Aabyhøj is characterized by a panoramic view across the broad and flat river valley of Aarhus Ådal

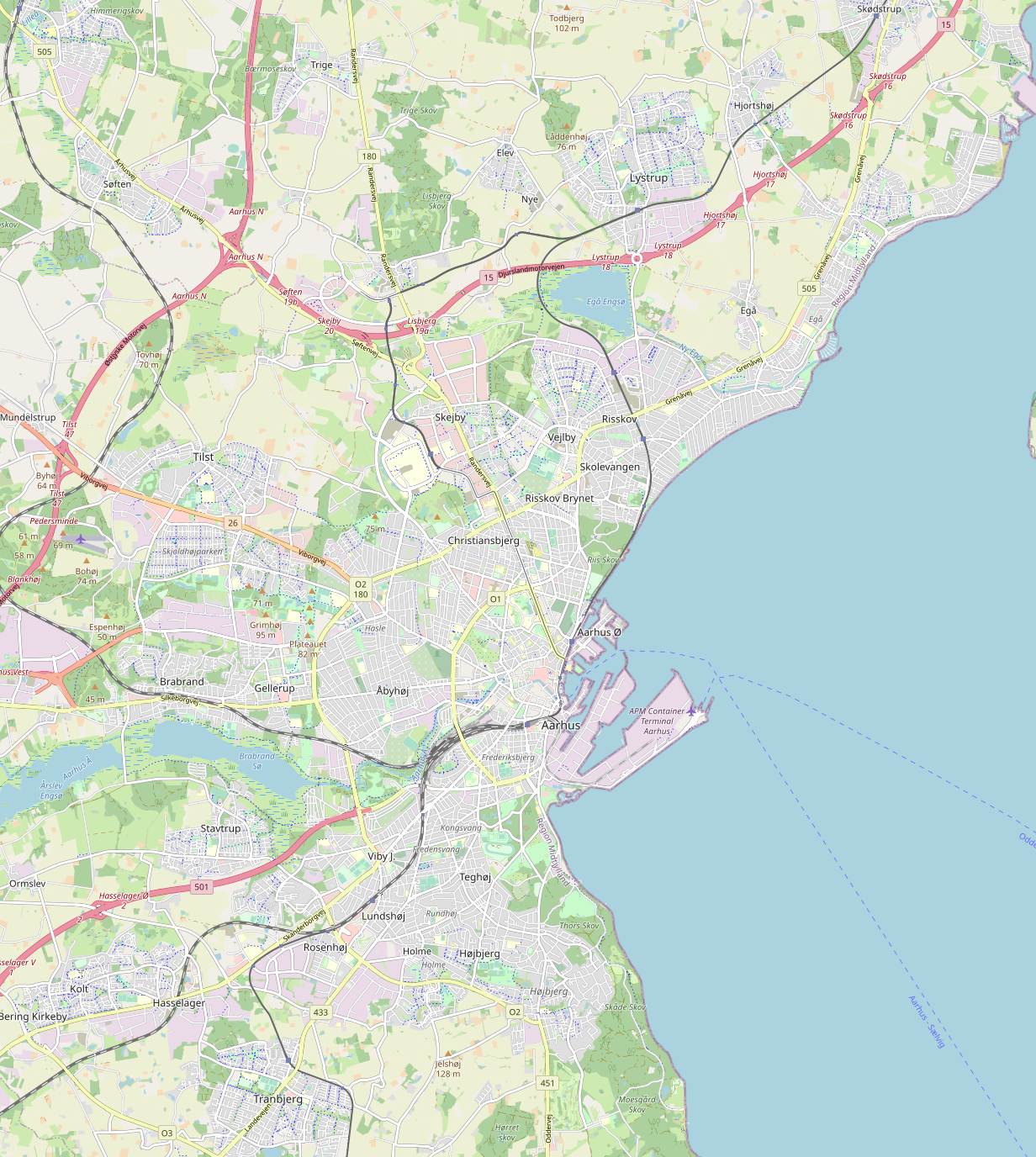
- Location within Aarhus
- Coordinates: 56.156768°N 10.168656°E
- Country: Denmark
- Regions of Denmark: Central Denmark Region
- Municipality: Aarhus Municipality
- District: Aarhus V
- Postal code: 8230

Aabyhøj , or Åbyhøj, is a neighborhood of Aarhus, Denmark. It is part of the postal district of Aarhus V and has a population of approximately 11,000 people and is home to Aabyhøj IF football club and Aabyhøj Basketball.

== History ==
Aabyhøj literally means Aaby-hill and the name reflects that it sprawled on the hillsides of the old village of Aaby at the Aarhus River. Aabyhøj comprise relatively modern buildings from or after the Industrial Revolution, but the old village charm can still be seen around Aaby, at the river banks in the southeast of Aabyhøj.

== Gallery ==
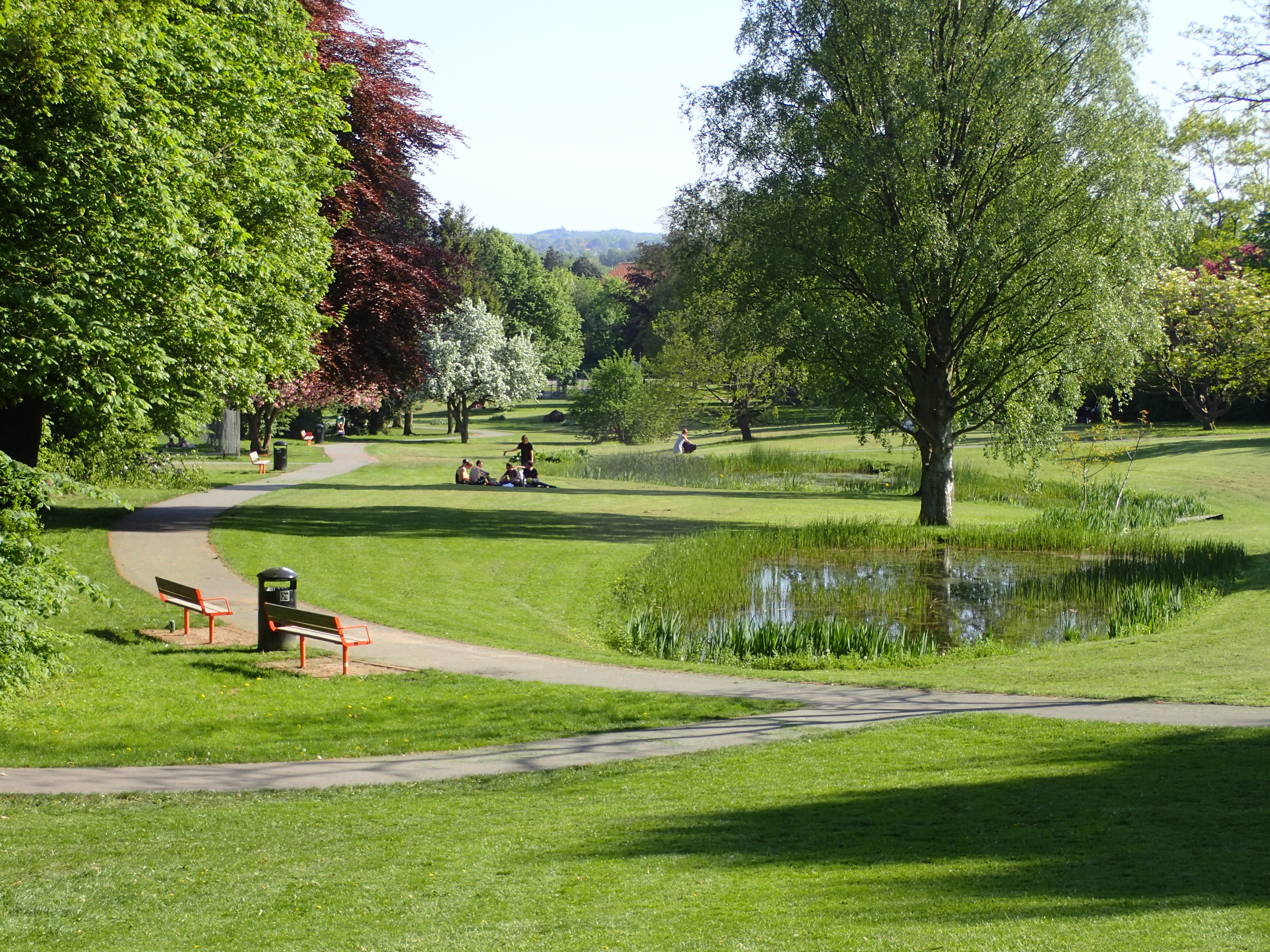
Åby Park

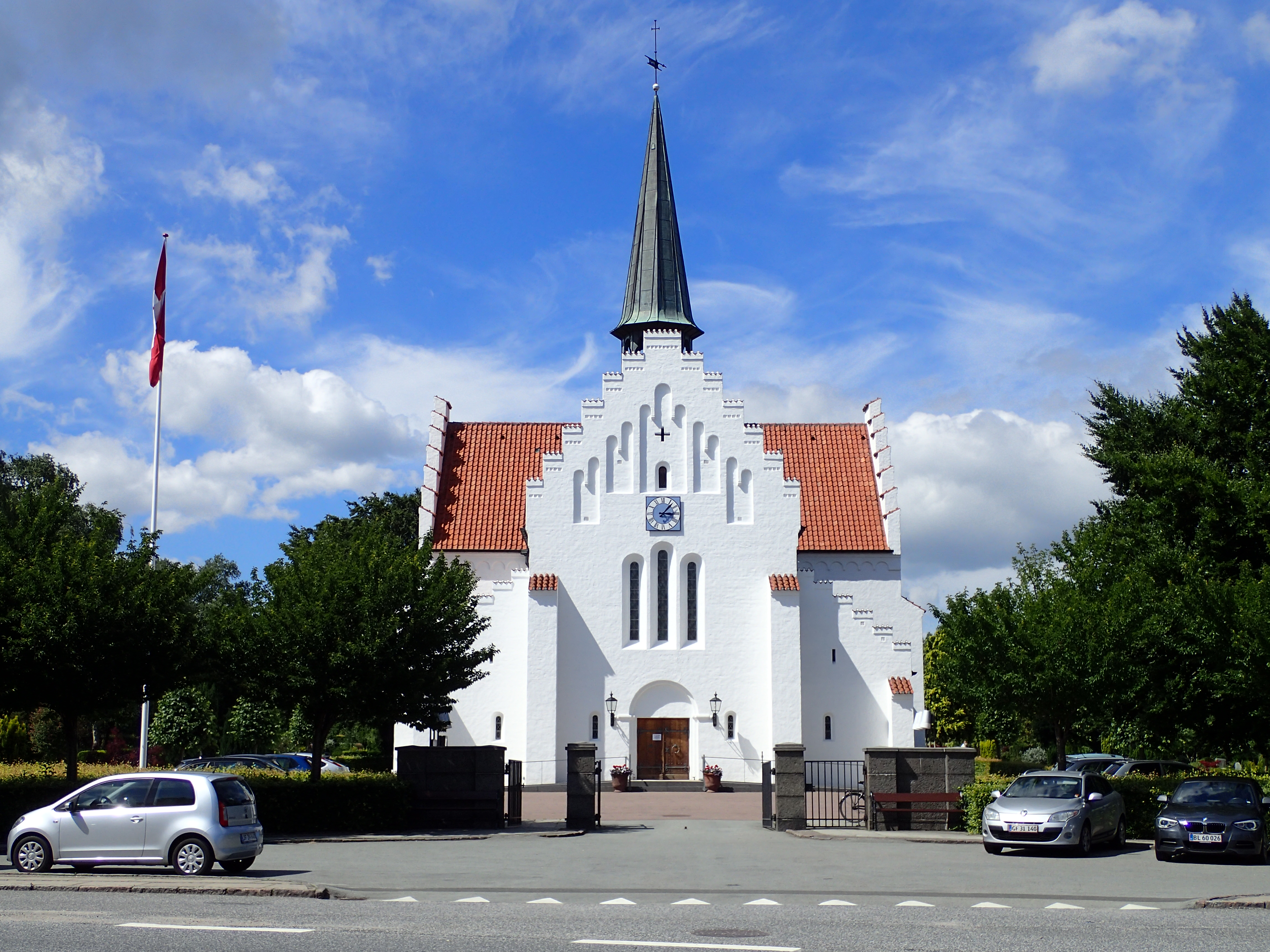
Åbyhøj Church

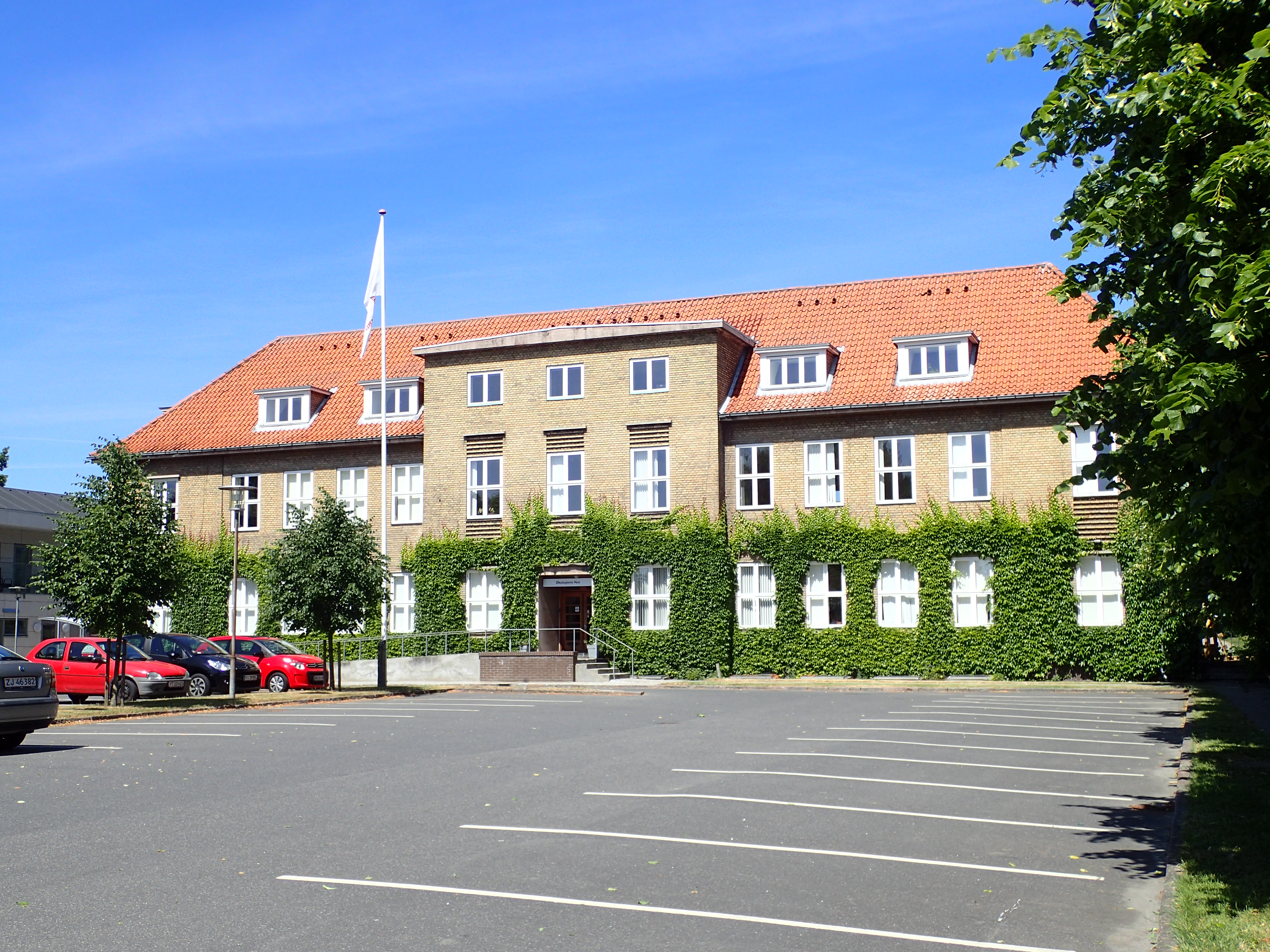
Aabyhøj Administrationsbygning (1937), former municipal administrative building

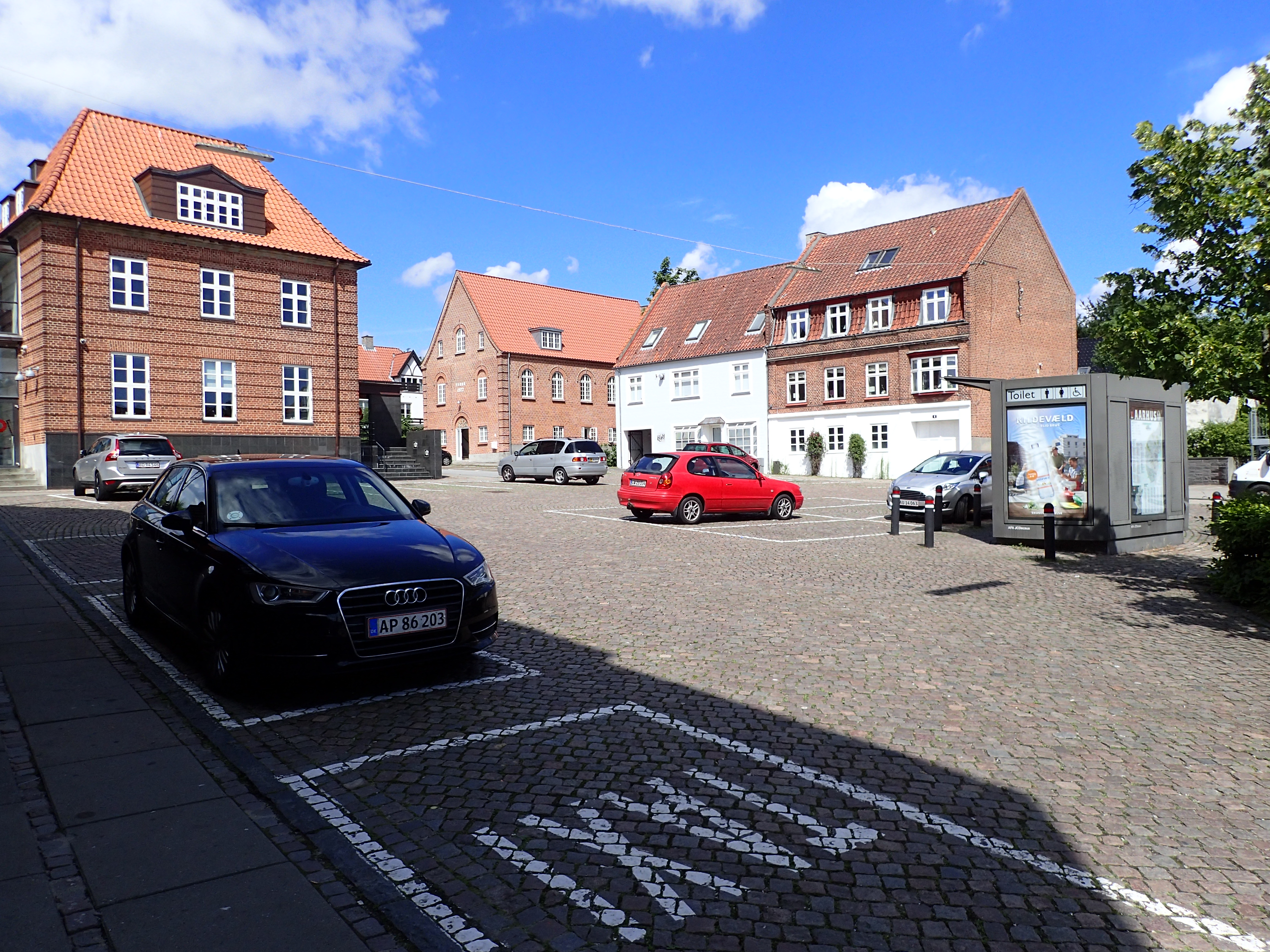
Åbyhøj town square

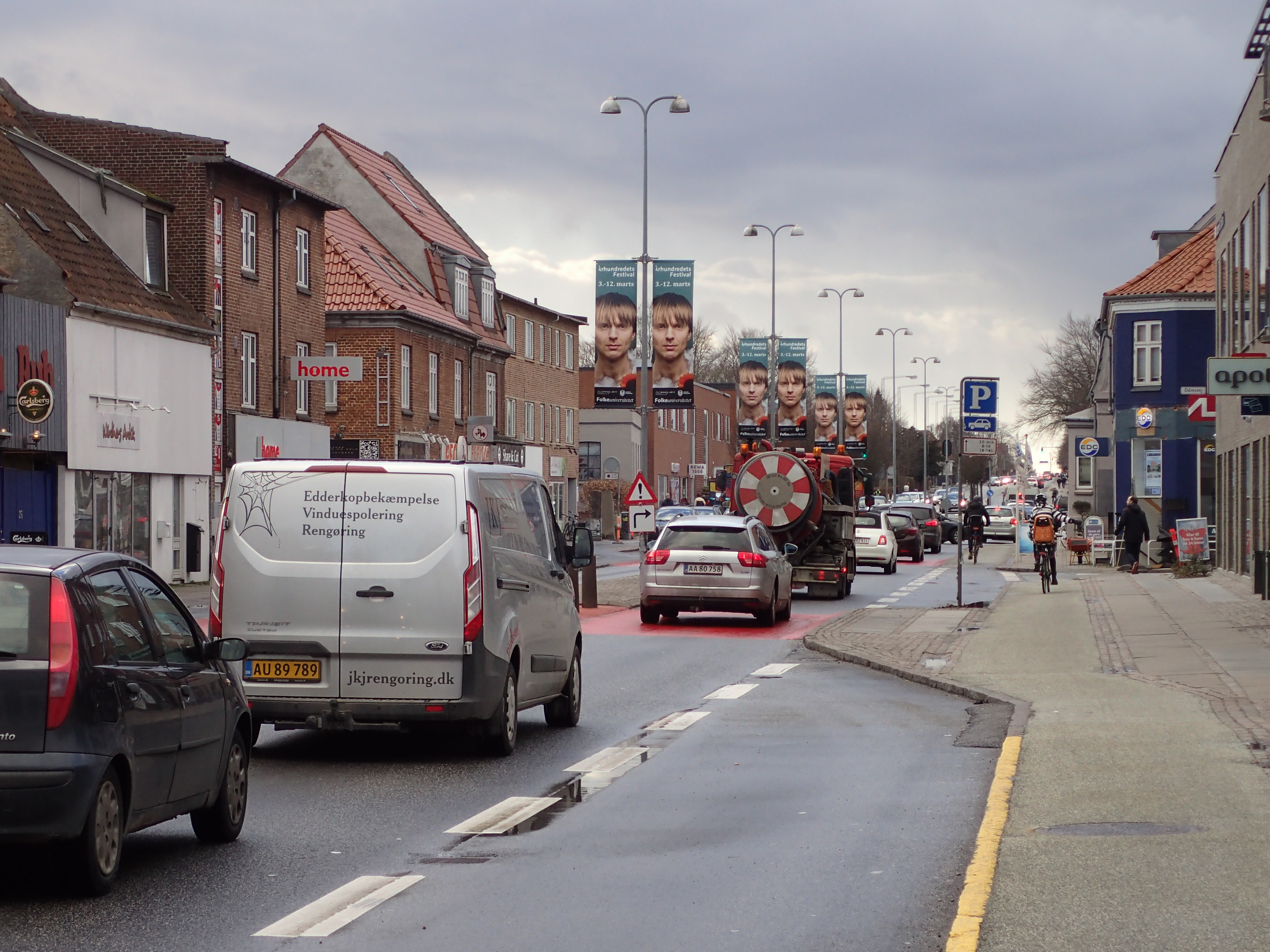
Silkeborgvej, an important gateway to Aarhus, cuts through Åbyhøj

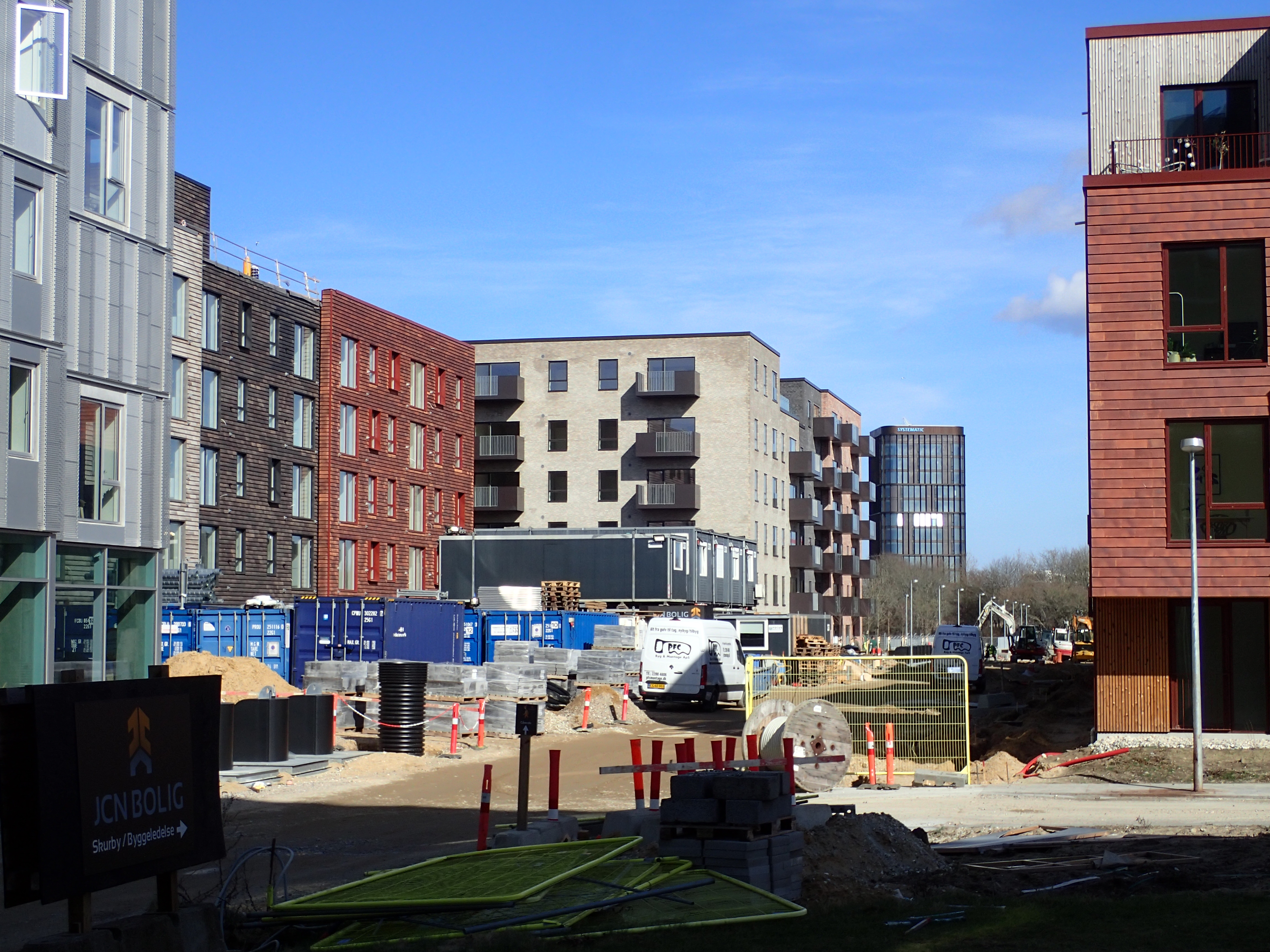
Åbyen, a new residential neighbourhood under construction

== Notable people ==
- Just Betzer, film producer
- Niels Brinck, singer-songwriter
- Tina Dickow, singer-songwriter and guitarist
- Jacob Vinjegaard
- Hans Ranum
- Frederik Krabbe, football player
- Kasper Jensen, racing driver

== See also ==
- Åbyhøj Church
- Aaby
- Aarhus V
