= Ellevang Church =

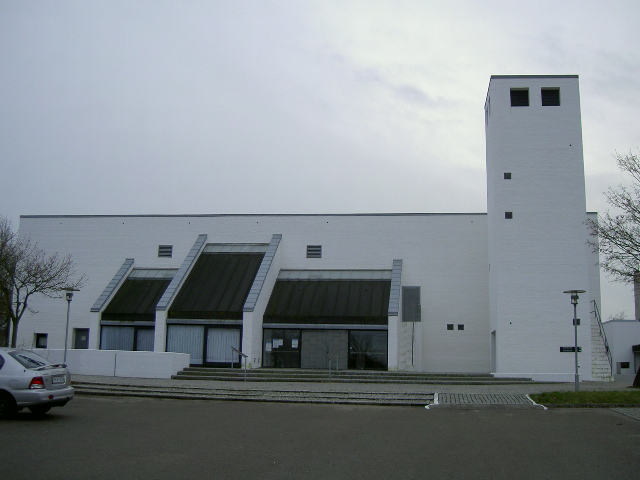
- Ellevang Church
- Ellevang Church
- 56.2020°N 10.2176°E
- Location: Jellebakken 42; 8240 Risskov
- Country: Denmark
- Denomination: Church of Denmark

History
- Status: Church

Architecture
- Completed: 1974

Specifications
- Materials: Brick

Administration
- Archdiocese: Diocese of Aarhus

Ellevang Church (Danish: Ellevang Kirke) is a church in Aarhus, Denmark. The church is situated in the northern Risskov neighbourhood on the street Jellebakken. Ellevang Church is a parish church, and the only church in Ellevang Parish, under the Diocese of Aarhus and within the Church of Denmark, the Danish state church. The church serves some 10.000 parishioners in Ellevang Parish and holds weekly sermons along with weddings, burials and baptisms.

The history of Ellevang Church stems from the population growth in Vejlby Parish during the 1960s. The parish had grown to some 15.000 inhabitants so it had become necessary to build a new church relieve the existing ones in Vejlby Parish and Vejl-Risskov Parish. Vejlby Parish had been divided in 1940 and Risskov Parish with Risskov Church, inaugurated in 1934, had been created. Vejlby Parish sought permission from the government to construct a new church in the north of Vejlby which was granted in 1973 on the condition that the new parish borders were drawn exclusively within Vejlby Parish. The new parish became Ellevang Parish which today has some 10.000 parishioners.

Construction of the church was initiated on 21 September 1973 and includes a few bricks from the 800 year old Vejlby Church as a symbol of the close connection to it. The church was completed and inaugurated on 1 December 1974 by the bishop of the time, Henning Høirup. The name of the parish and church was selected by the parishioners by popular vote as a reference to a medieval name of the area. The new parish shared the pastorate with Vejlby church until 1974 when the parish had grown to almost 6000 parishioners and the church got its own priest. Ellevang Church does not have its own cemetery and still shares the Vejlby Church cemetery.

== See also ==
- List of churches in Aarhus
