= Sønder Aarslev Church =

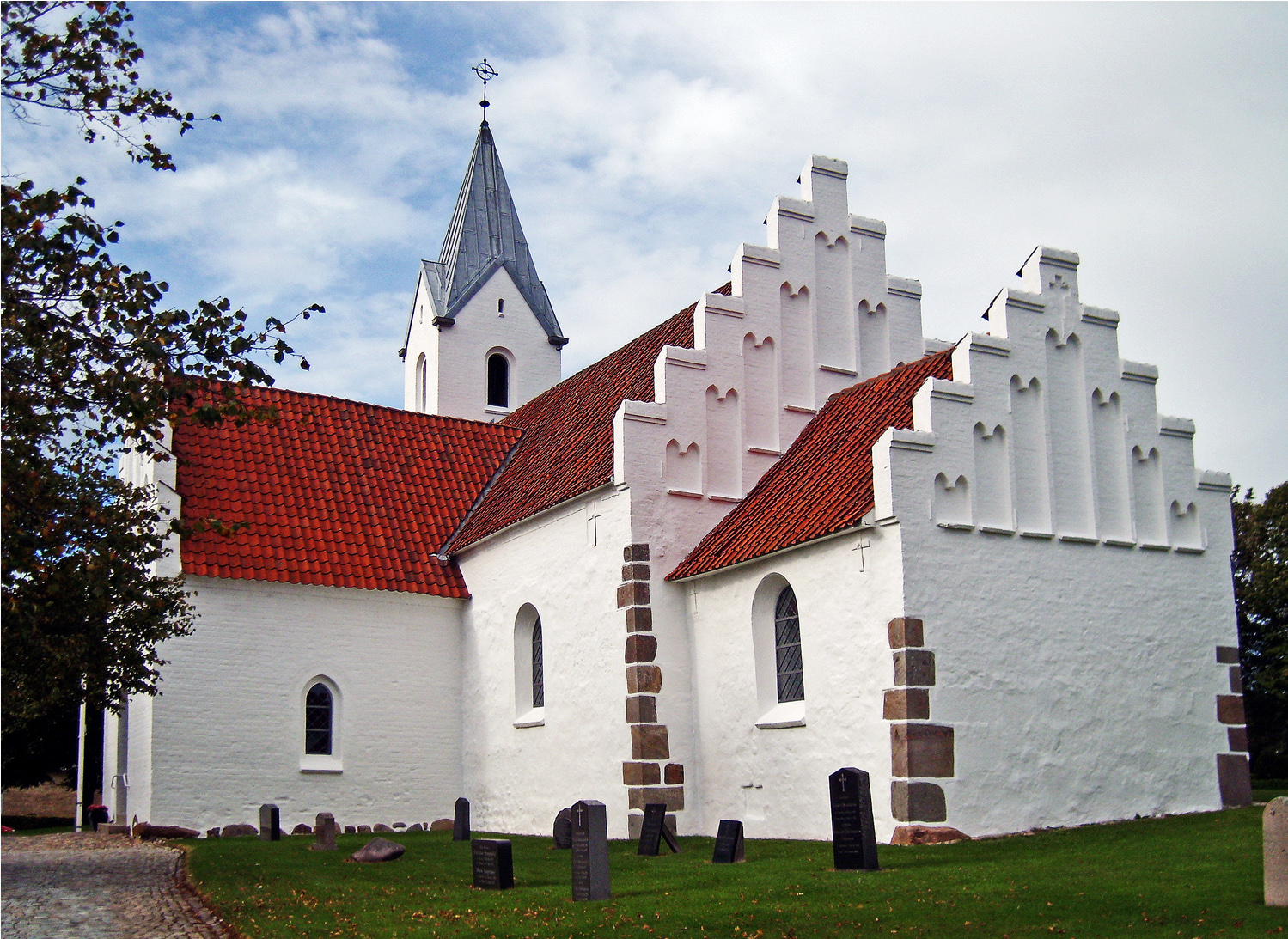
- Sønder Aarslev Church
- Sønder Aarslev Church
- 56.1522°N 10.0704°E
- Location: Brabrand, Aarhus
- Country: Denmark
- Denomination: Church of Denmark
- Previous denomination: Catholic Church

History
- Status: Church

Architecture
- Architectural type: Romanesque
- Completed: 1100s

Specifications
- Materials: Brick

Administration
- Archdiocese: Diocese of Aarhus

Sønder Aarslev Church (Danish: Sønder Aarslev Kirke) is a church located in Årslev, a small village-suburb in the western parts of Aarhus, Denmark. Årslev is situated in the Brabrand district, west of Aarhus city center. It is the church of Sønder Årslev Parish within the Church of Denmark and serves a parish population of 993 (2016). The church has an adjoining cemetery and the painter Jens Hansen-Aarslev (1847–1928) is buried there.

== History ==
Sønder Aarslev Church originally belonged to the Ancient See of Aarhus but after the reformation ownership passed to the Danish Crown. In 1686 the owner of Kærbygård Manor Otto Bielke was given Sønder Aarslev Church by king Christian V but five years later he sold it to the merchant Christen Wegerslev in Aarhus. In the following the church changed owners several times before Count Christian Frijs of Frijsenborg Manor bought the church at auction in 1758. In 1912 the church became self-owning in connection with the abolition of tithe.

Until 12 May 1873, Tilst Church functioned as an annex to Sønder Aarslev Church in Sønder Aarslev Parish. In 1873, Sønder Aarslev Church itself became an annex church to Brabrand Church, while Tilst Church became the primary church in its own pastorate where Kasted Church was an annex.

== Architecture ==
The oldest parts of the church building were likely constructed in the end of the 1100s when a stone church replaced an original wooden structure. In the late Middle Ages the church was expanded and the original flat wooden ceiling was replaced with Gothic rib vaults. The first tower, a Stilt Tower, is likely from this period as well. In 1883 the church got its current tower. In 1870 the church was extensively renovated and crow-stepped gables were added and the north door was walled off.

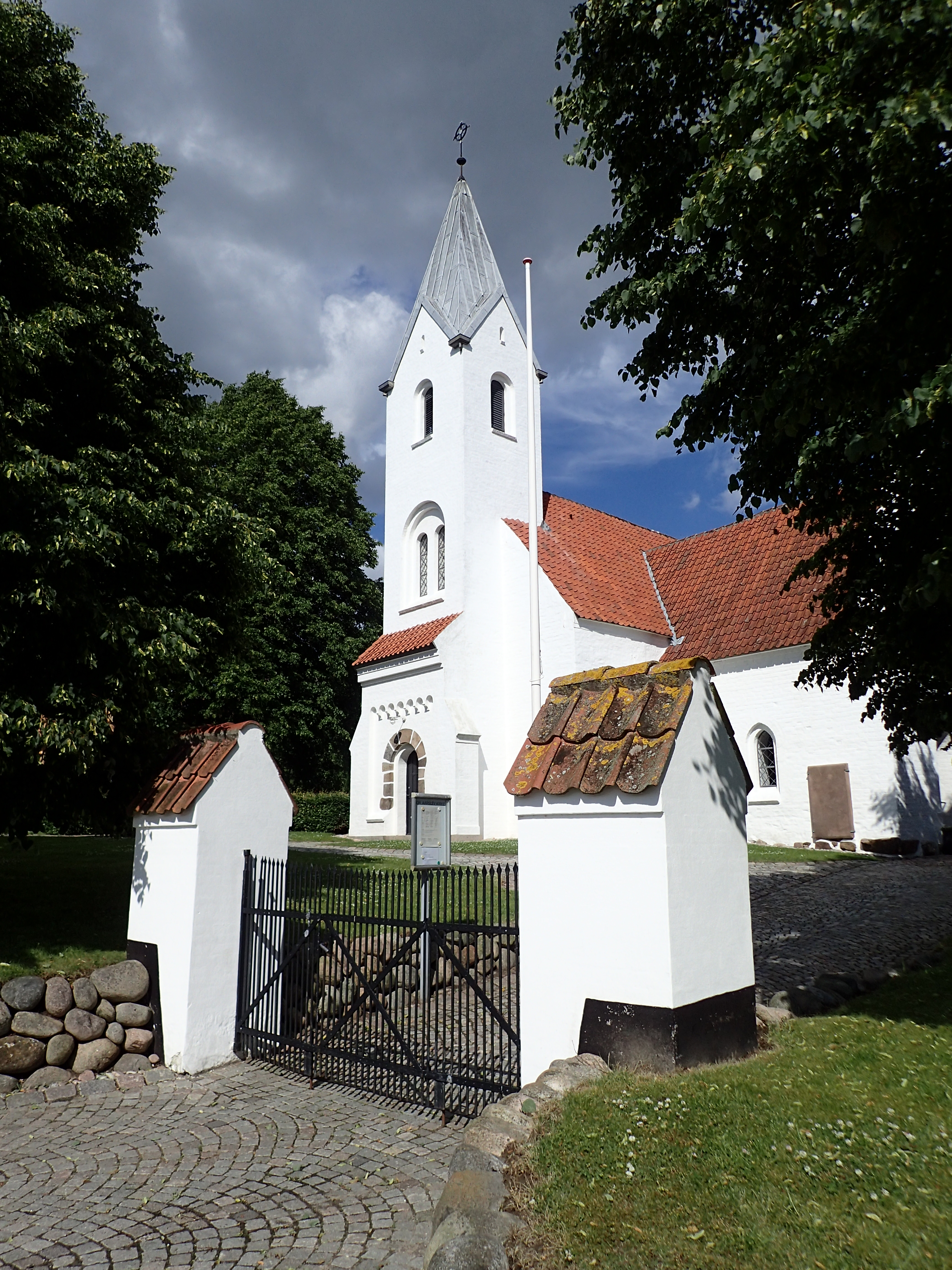

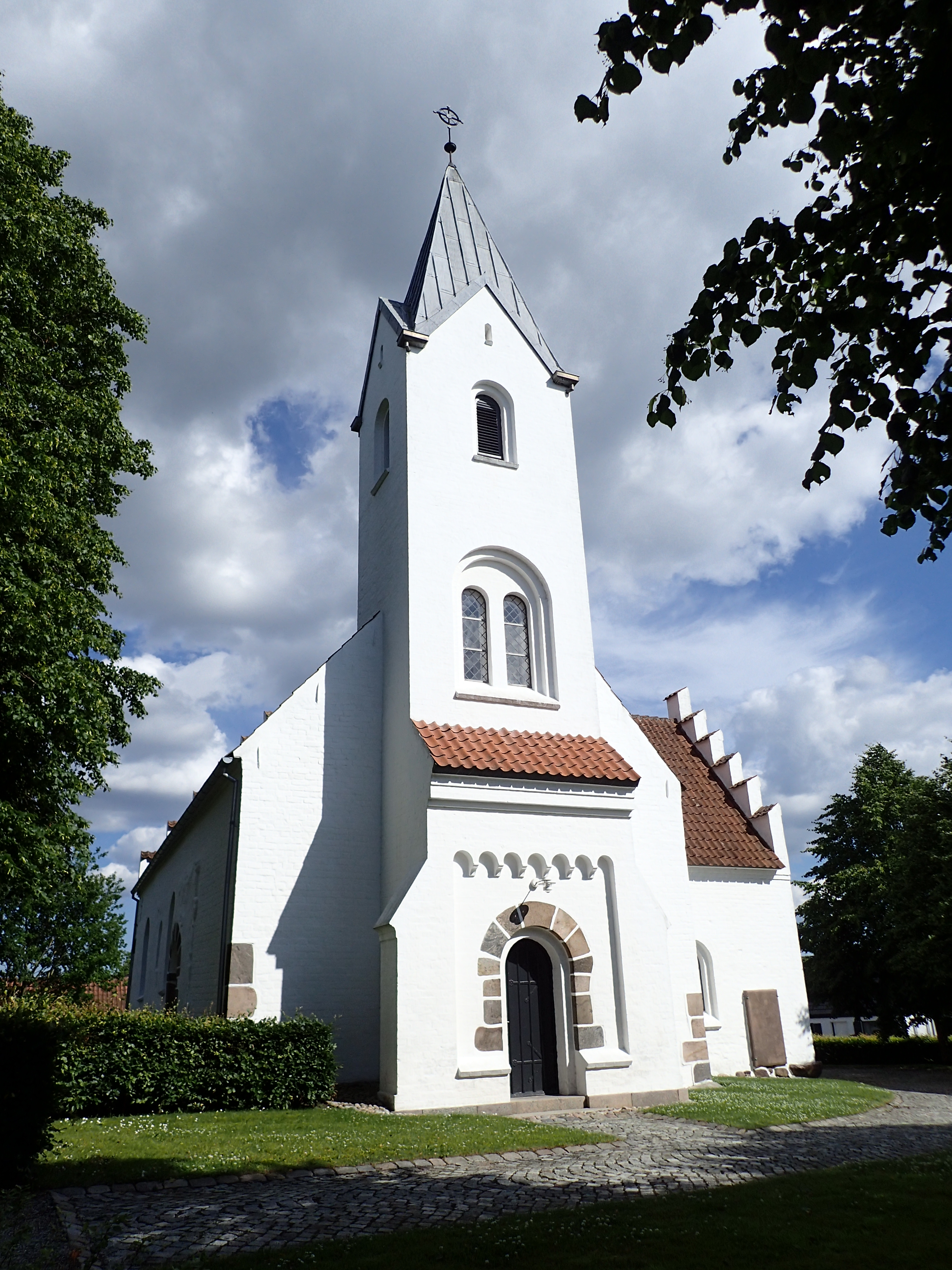

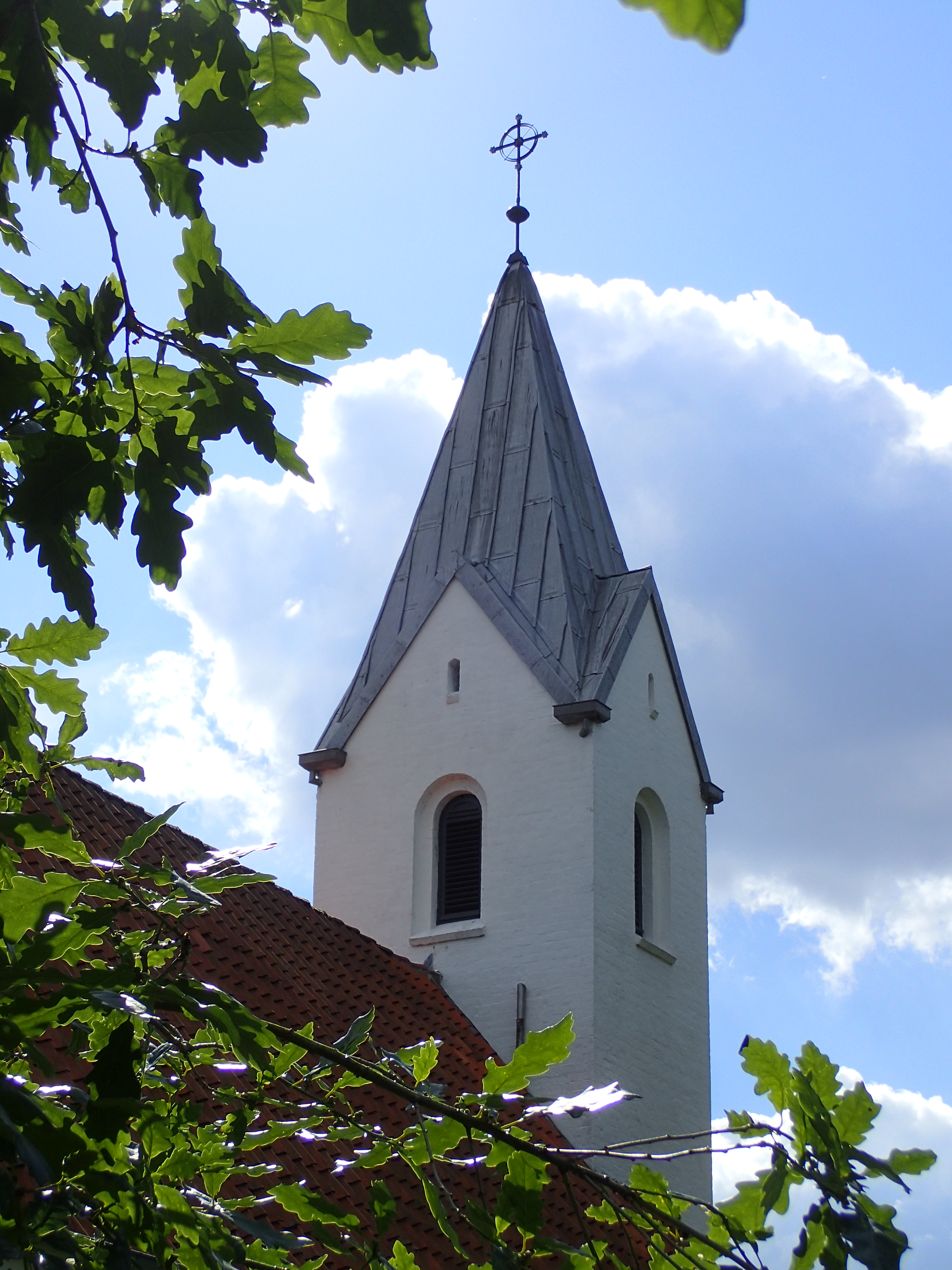

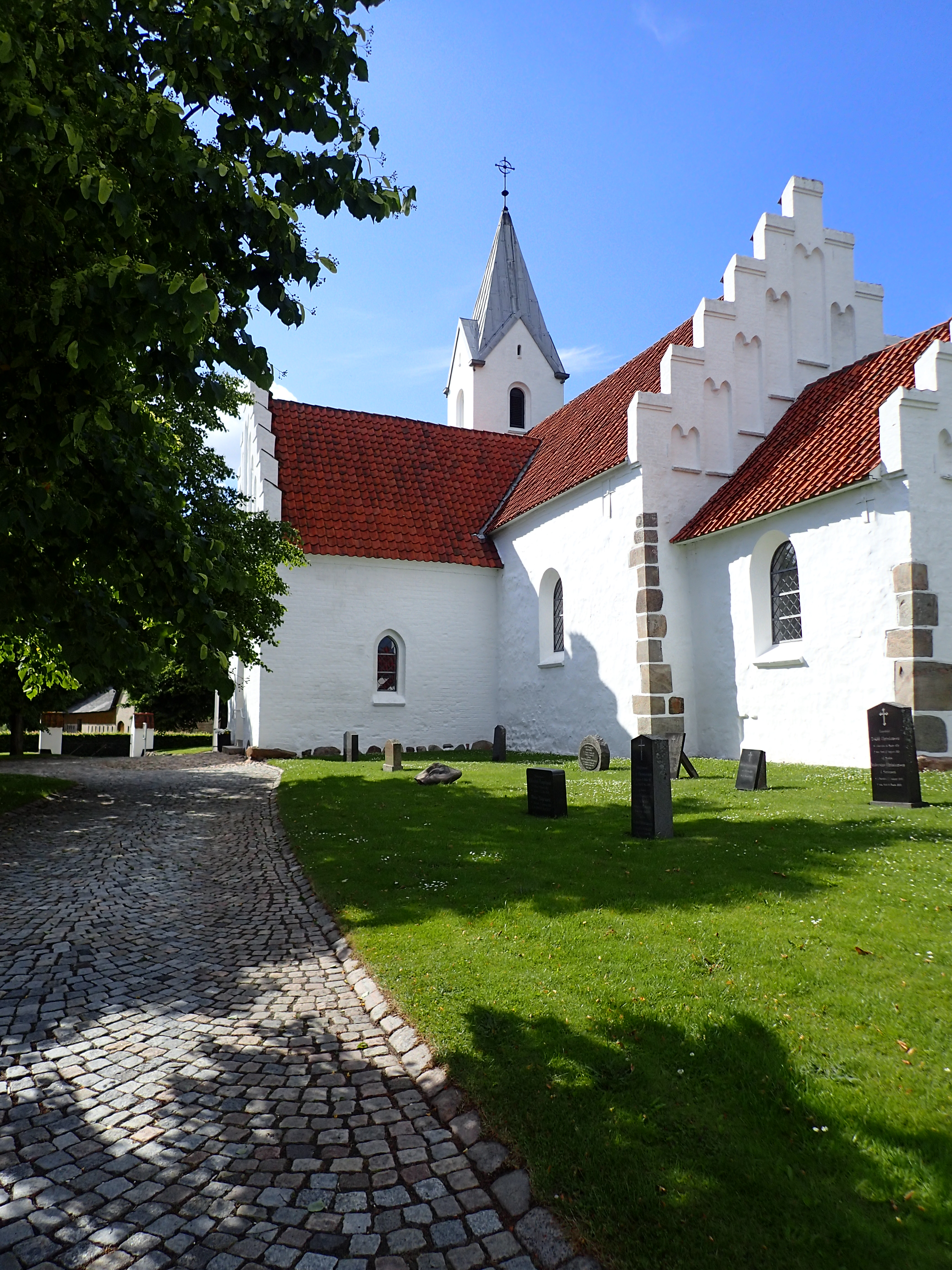

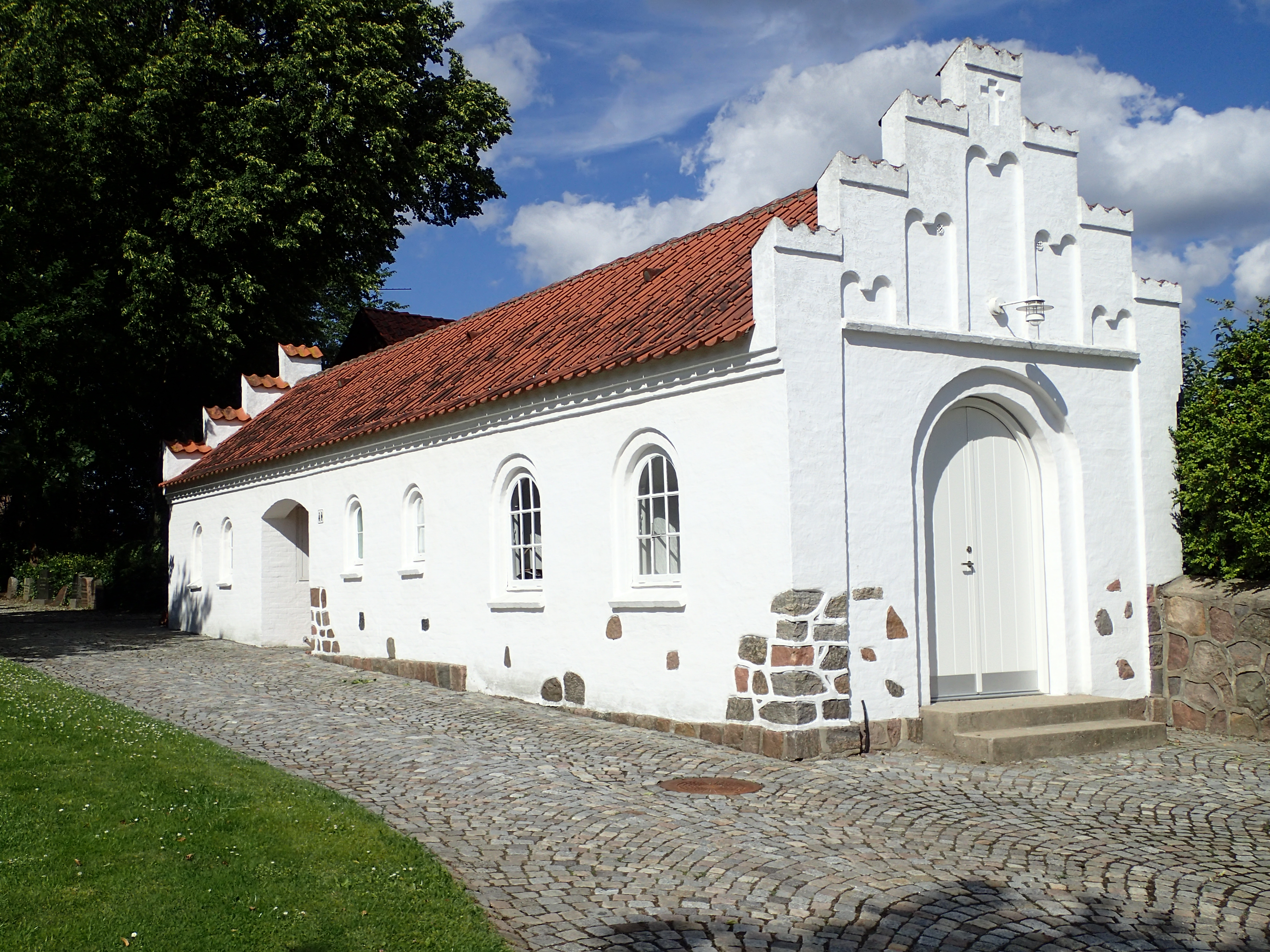

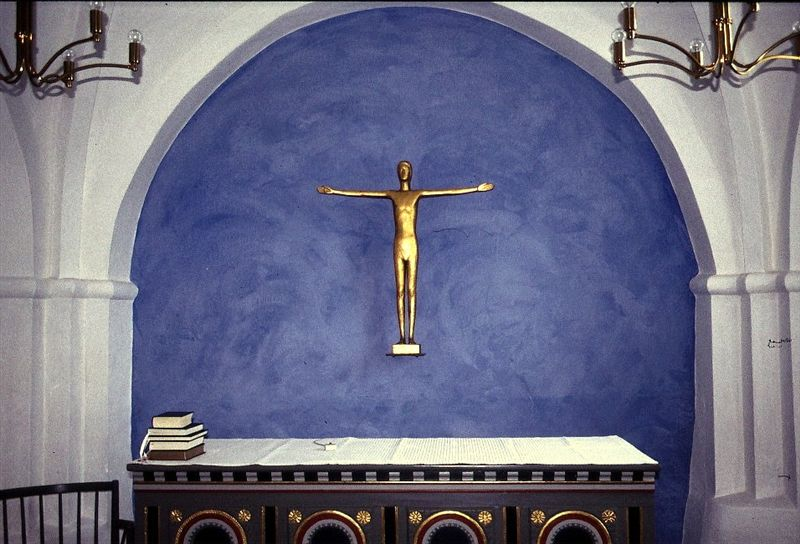

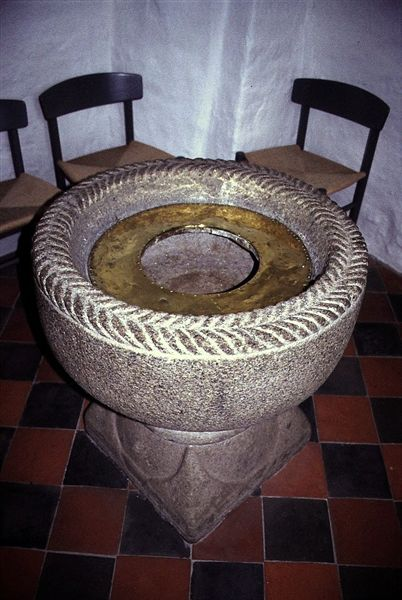

== See also ==
- List of Churches in Aarhus
