= Hasle Church (disambiguation) =

Hasle Church may refer to:

- Hasle Church, a church in Aarhus, Denmark
- Hasle Church, a church on the island of Bornholm, Denmark
- Hasle Church, a church in Oslo, Norway
