= Kolt Church =

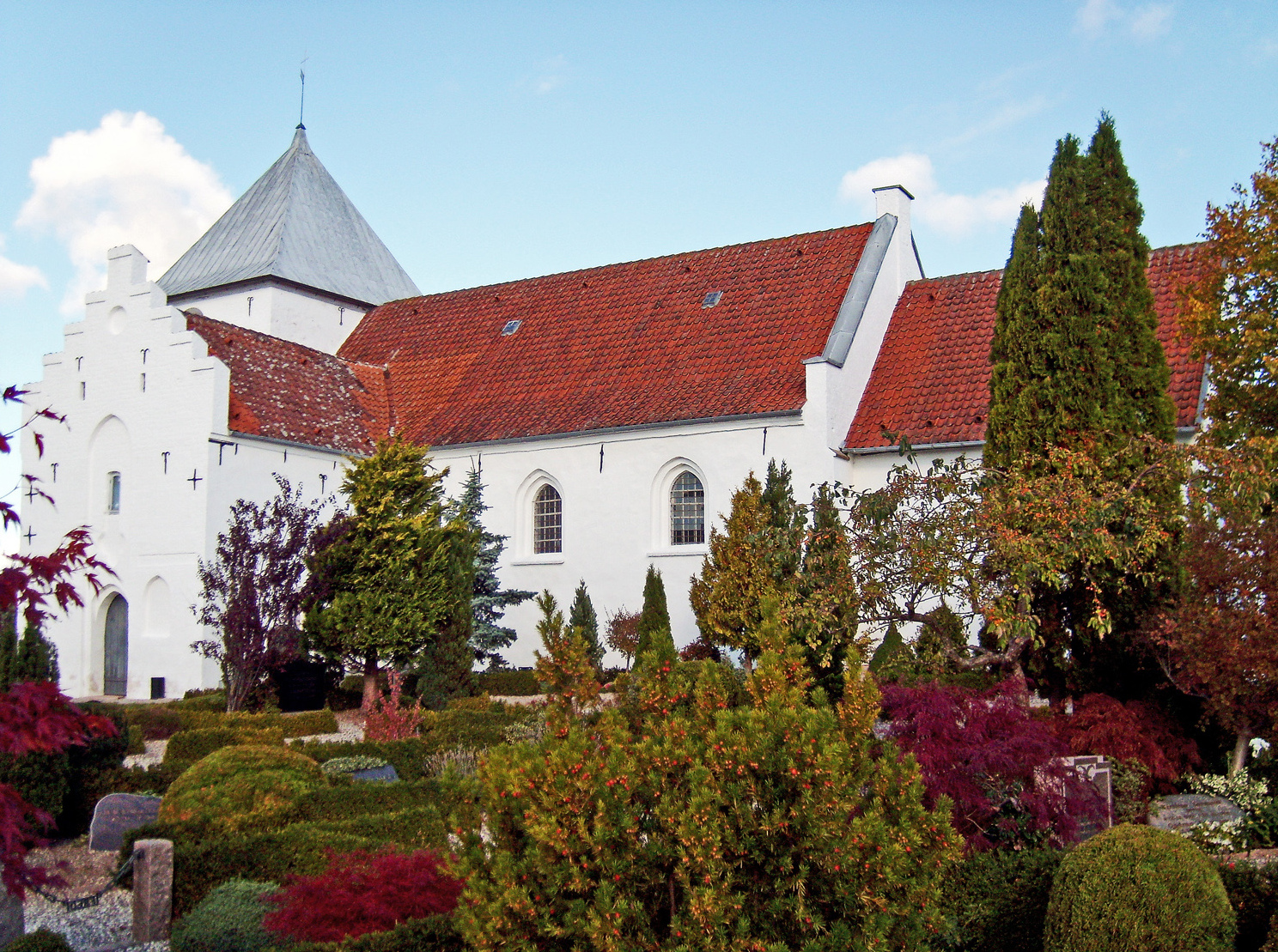
- Kolt Church
- Kolt Church
- 56.109343°N 10.070669°E
- Location: Kolt, Aarhus
- Country: Denmark
- Denomination: Church of Denmark
- Previous denomination: Catholic Church

History
- Status: Church

Architecture
- Architectural type: Romanesque
- Completed: 1100s

Specifications
- Materials: Brick

Administration
- Archdiocese: Diocese of Aarhus

Kolt Church (Danish: Kolt Kirke) is a church located in Kolt Parish in Aarhus, Denmark. The church is situated in the Hasselager neighborhood, south-west of Viby. It is a parish church of the Church of Denmark and there's population of 6.973 within the parish borders (2016).

== History ==
Kolt Church was built sometime between 1150 and 1250 like most of the small Danish village churches. It is probable that the king had the patronage of Kolt Church in the Middle Ages. In 1433 it is mentioned as Vor Frue Kirke (Church of Our Lady), as written on the altar chalice. In the period between 1661 and 1675 the Danish crown sold the church to the Count Mogens Friis who made it a part of the duchy Frijsenborg. In 1802 the church was sold on auction to members of the parish and in 1924 it became a self-owning institution. Since the 1550s the church has functioned as a church annex to the village Ormslev under joint supervision of Ormslev-Kolt Church Office (Ormslev-Kolt kirkekontor). In 1819 the position as church guardian was temporary and passed around in the parish resulting in poor maintenance as nobody wanted to invest in maintenance and renovation during their short tenures. Today Kolt Church is situated in a neighborhood of Aarhus.

== Architecture ==
Kolt Church consists of Romanesque apse, chancel and nave with two late-Medieval additions: the porch in the south and the tower in the west. The Romanesque sections are built of rough and hewn granite boulders on a chamfered base; ashlar were used in the corners and around the windows and doors. Gothic vaults were included in the chancel and nave in the late Middle Age. In the masonry of the tower a quantity of re-used granite ashlar is included which may have been brought here from a demolished church. The spire, which is in a mansard style, was erected in the 1700s.

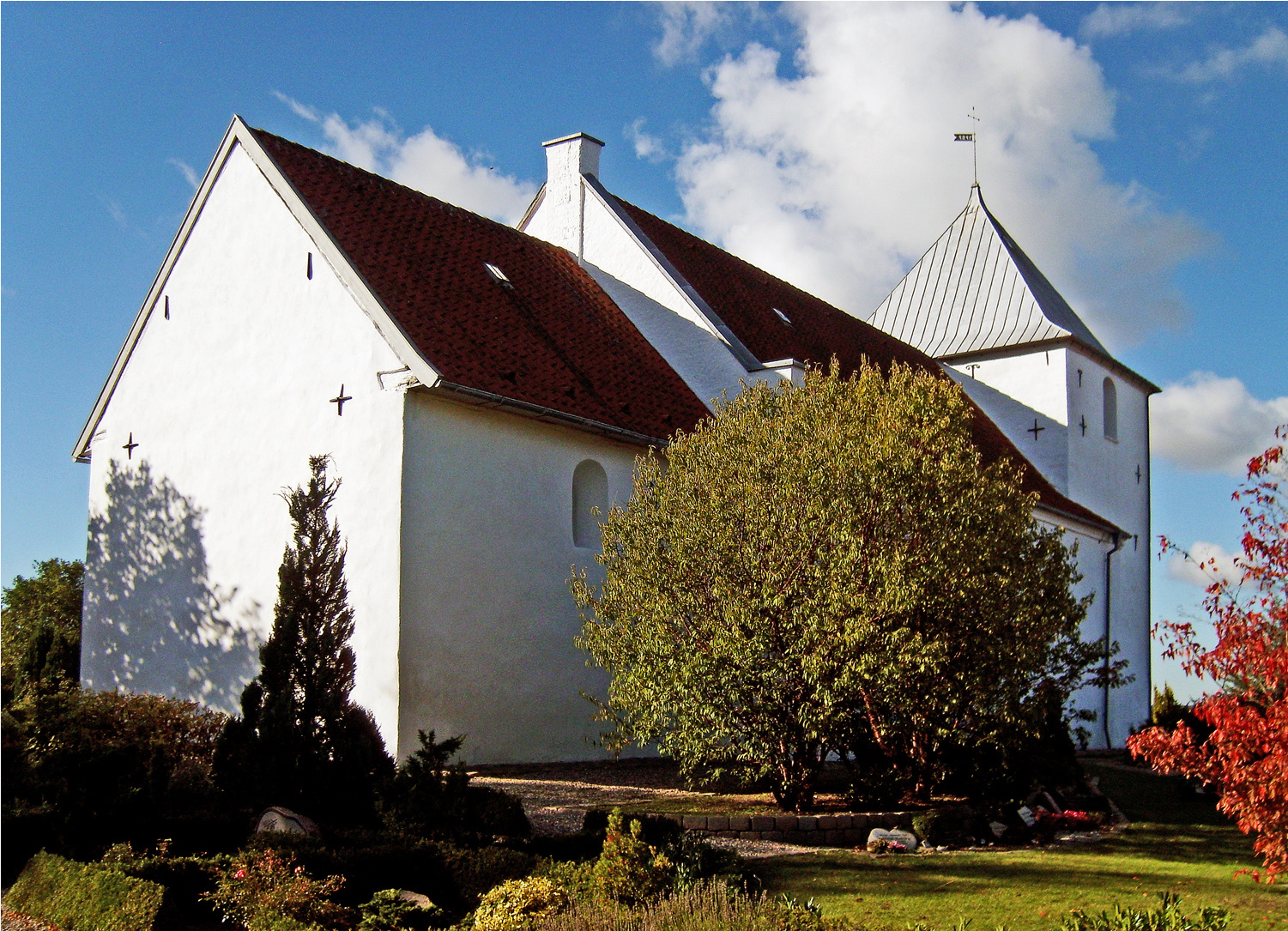

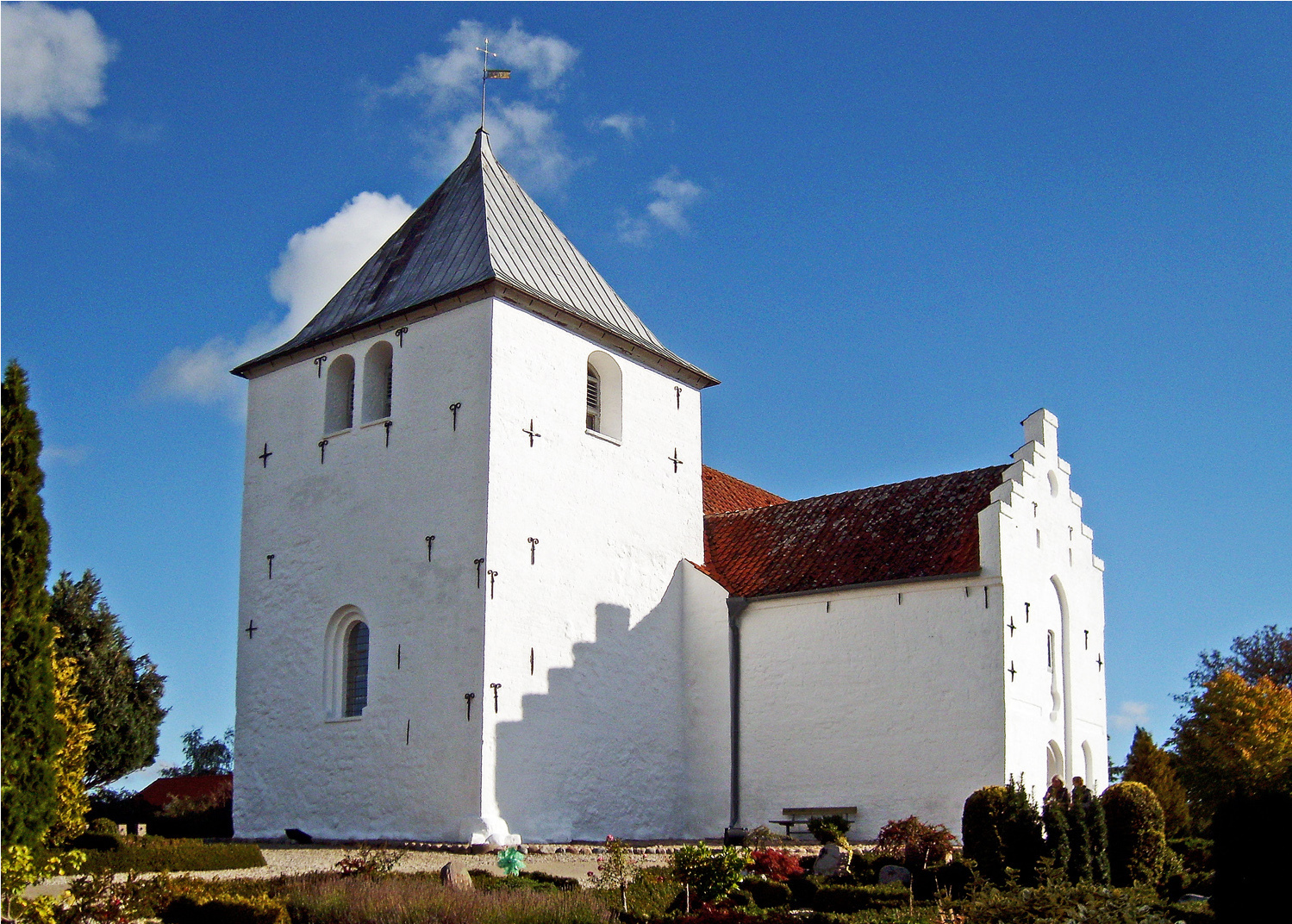

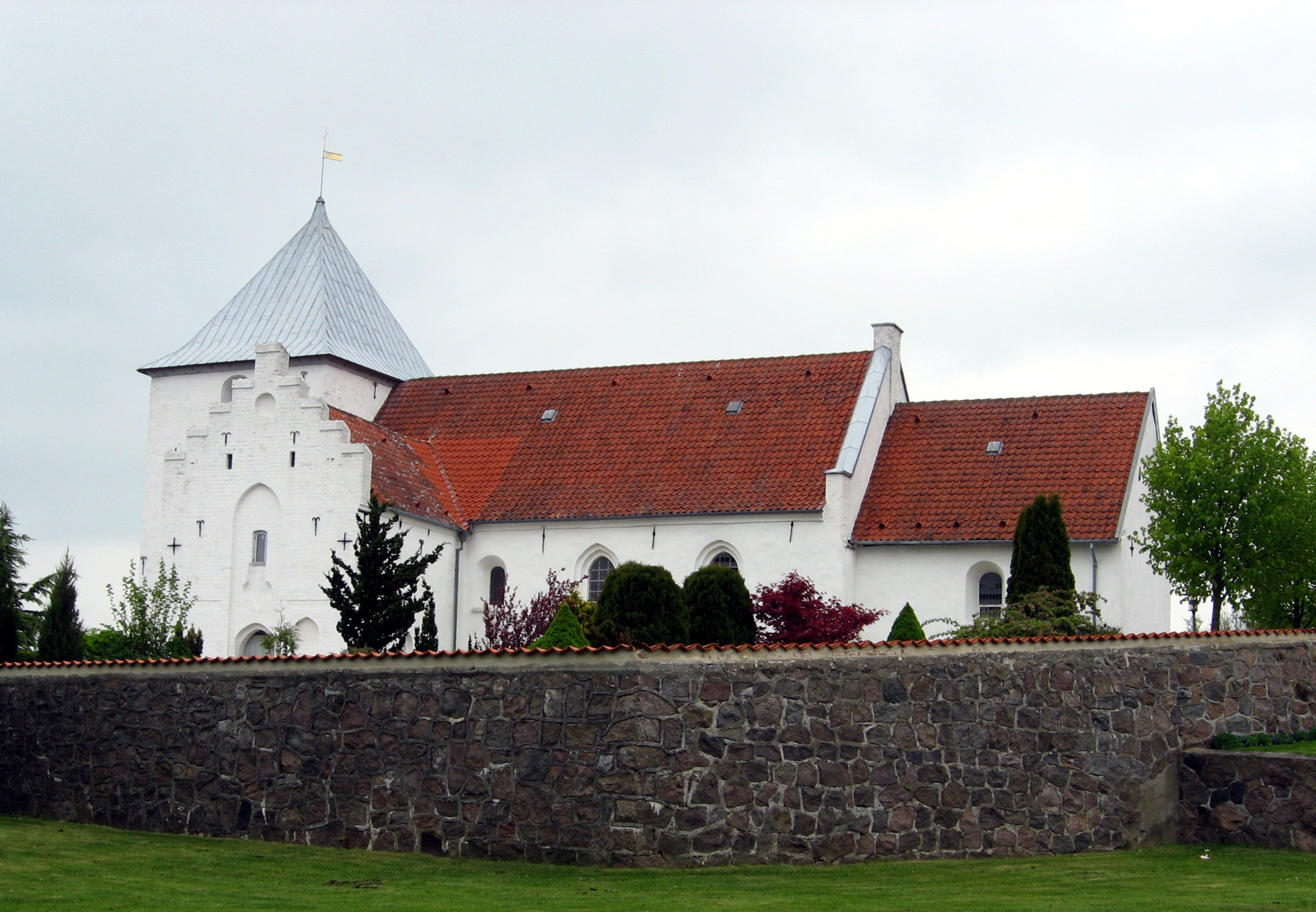

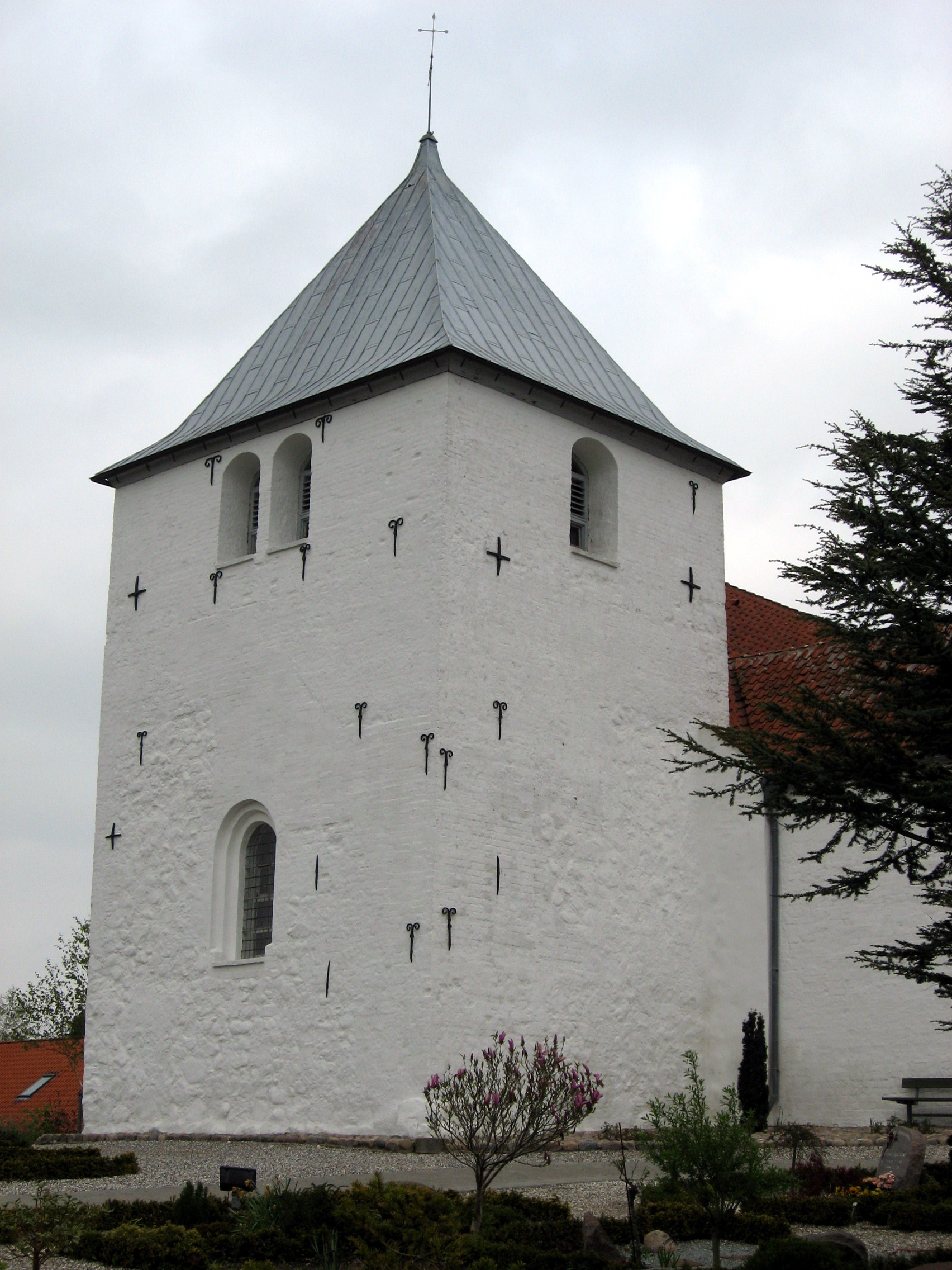

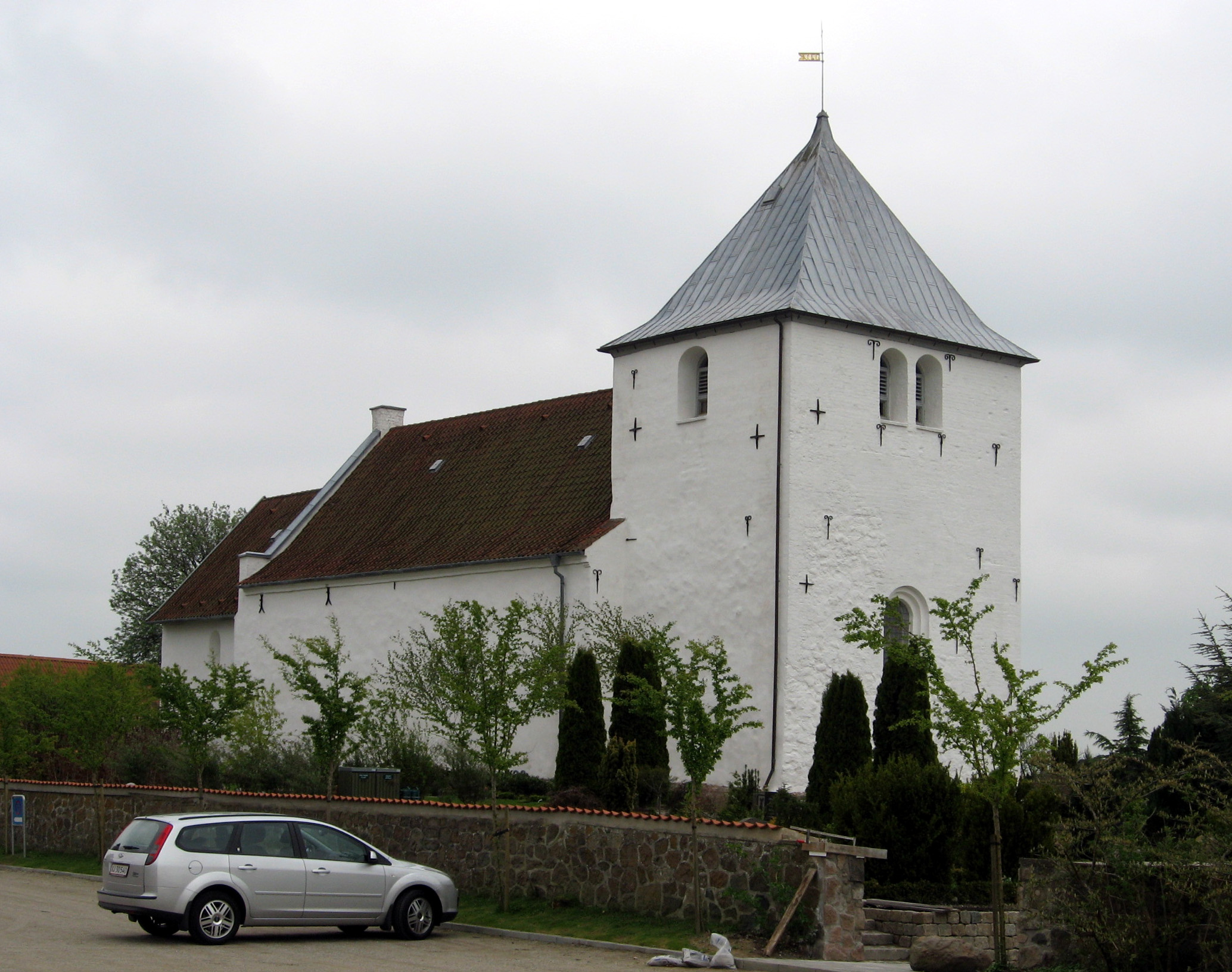

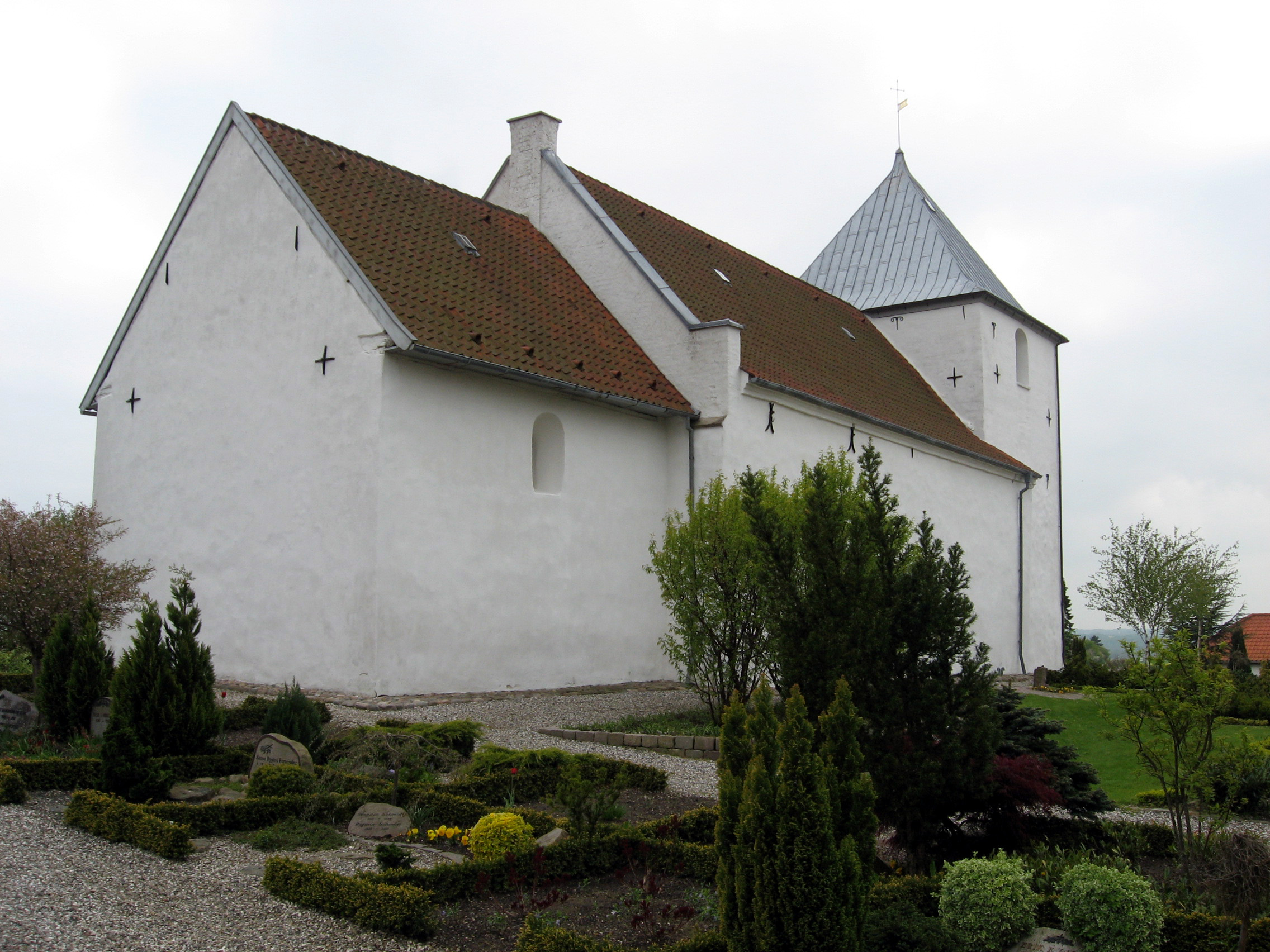

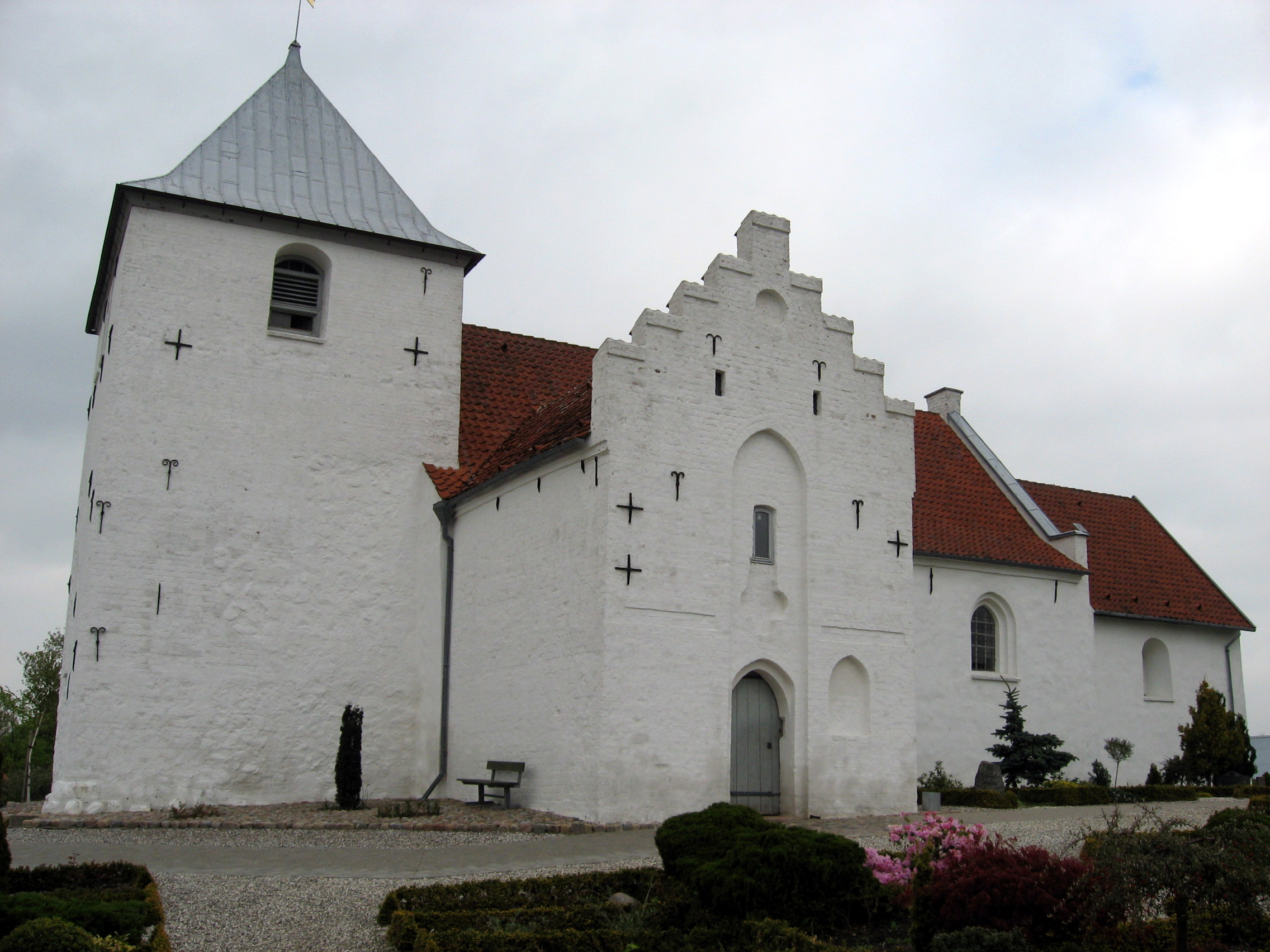

== See also ==
- List of Churches in Aarhus
