= List of churches in Aarhus =

This list of churches in Aarhus lists church buildings in Aarhus, Denmark.

Name	Denomination	Year	Coordinates	Image	Refs
Egå Church	Church of Denmark	1100s	56°12′58.84″N 10°15′55.72″E		Website
Hasle Church	Church of Denmark	1100s	56°10′10.9″N 10°09′40.2″E		Website
Skejby Church	Church of Denmark	1100s	56°11′59.4″N 10°10′28.6″E		Website
Tilst Church	Church of Denmark	1100s	56°11′34.7″N 10°06′37.9″E		Website
Tranbjerg Church	Church of Denmark	1100s	56°05′30.7″N 10°08′05.0″E		Website
Vejlby Church	Church of Denmark	1100s	56°11′42″N 10°12′43″E		Website
Sønder Aarslev Church	Church of Denmark	1100s	56°9′8.1″N 10°4′13.3″E		Website
Kolt Church	Church of Denmark	1100s	56°6′33.7″N 10°4′15.3″E		Website
Viby Church	Church of Denmark	1100s	56°7′41.6″N 10°9′56.4″E		Website
Aarhus Cathedral	Church of Denmark	1190	56°9′25″N 10°12′38″E		Website
Brabrand Church	Church of Denmark	1200	56°09′6.6″N 10°6′5″E		Website
Church of Our Lady	Church of Denmark	1250	56°9′28.9″N 10°12′17″E		Website
Catholic Church of Our Lady	Catholic	1880	56°09′05.6″N 10°12′16.5″E		Website
Åby Church	Church of Denmark	1872	56°8′44.3″N 10°9′4.5″E		Website
Holme Church	Church of Denmark	1882	56°6′56.16″N 10°10′27.12″E		Website
St. Pauls Church	Church of Denmark	1887	56°8′45.9″N 10°12′14.2″E		Website
St. Nicholas' Church	Catholic Church	1893	56°9′3.29″N 10°12′0.93″E		Website
St. John's Church	Church of Denmark	1905	56°10′8.87″N 10°12′36.4″E		Website
Aarhus Methodist Church	United Methodist Church	1912	56°9′39.32″N 10°12′8.03″E		Website
Lyseng Church	Church of Denmark	1913	56°6′33.48″N 10°11′14.28″E		Website
Risskov Church	Church of Denmark	1922	56°11′17.5″N 10°14′10.6″E		Website
St. Luke's Church	Church of Denmark	1926	56°8′41.2″N 10°11′38.5″E		Website
St. Mark's Church	Church of Denmark	1935	56°9′38.29″N 10°11′50.54″E		Website
Åbyhøj Church	Church of Denmark	1942	56°9′18.7″N 10°9′26.8″E		Website
Frederik's Church	Church of Denmark	1942	56°6′4.4″N 10°12′1.2″E		Website
Christian's Church	Church of Denmark	1958	56°10′38.1″N 10°11′44.5″E		Website
Møllevang Church	Church of Denmark	1959	56°09′56.7″N 10°10′57″E		Website
Fredens Church	Church of Denmark	1960	56°07′45.1″N 10°11′00.6″E		Website
Langenæs Church	Church of Denmark	1966	56°8′27.5″N 10°10′43.4″E		Website
Ellevang Church	Church of Denmark	1974	56°12′7.6″N 10°13′4″E		Website
Ravnsbjerg Church	Church of Denmark	1976	56°7′21.5″N 10°8′33.2″E		Website
Gellerup Church	Church of Denmark	1976	56°9′20.75″N 10°8′1.90″E		Website
Skjoldhøj Church	Church of Denmark	1984	56°10′26.4″N 10°7′19.4″E		Website
Church of the Holy Ghost	Church of Denmark	1984	56°10′48″N 10°10′2″E		Website
Skelager Church	Church of Denmark	1990	56°11′32.4″N 10°11′41.7″E		Website
Skæring Church	Church of Denmark	1994	56°14′02.4″N 10°18′17.8″E		Website
Citykirken Århus	Free church	2010	56°10′08.6″N 10°09′35.5″E		Website
Saralyst Church	Inner Mission	2010	56°06′30.4″N 10°11′14.7″E		Website

== See also ==
- Listed buildings in Aarhus Municipality
