= Christian's Church =

Christian's Church may refer to:

- Christian's Church, Copenhagen, a Church of Denmark church in Copenhagen
- Christian's Church, Aarhus, a Church of Denmark church in Aarhus
