= Møllevang Church =

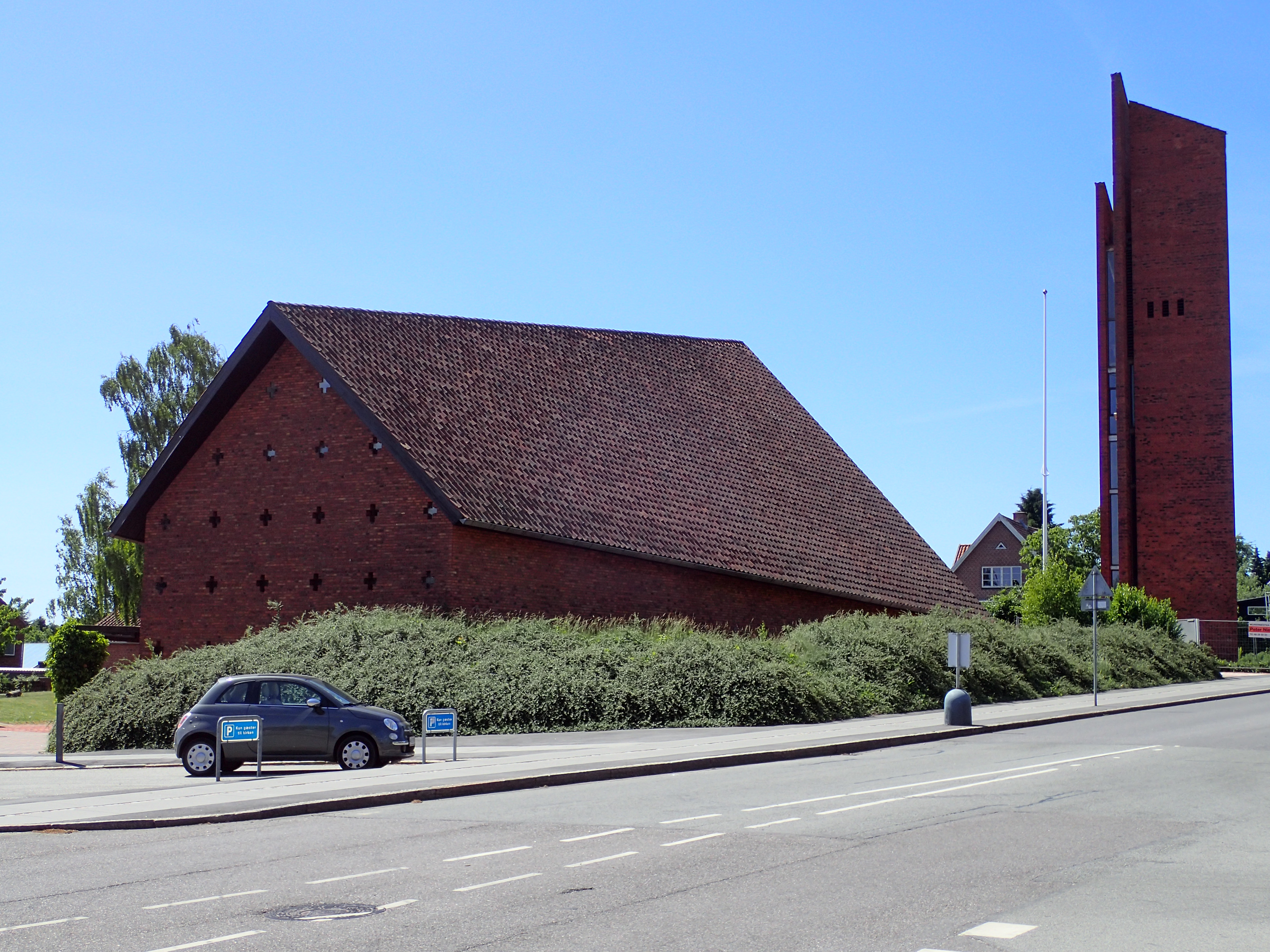
- Møllevang Church front entrance
- Møllevang Church
- 56.1657°N 10.1827°E
- Location: Fuglesangs Alle 48; 8210 Aarhus V
- Country: Denmark
- Denomination: Church of Denmark

History
- Status: Church

Architecture
- Completed: 1959

Specifications
- Materials: Brick

Administration
- Archdiocese: Diocese of Aarhus

Møllevang Church (Danish: Møllevangskirken) is a church in Aarhus, Denmark. The church is situated in the Fuglebakken neighborhood on the street Fuglesangs Alle, north of Ring 1, in Western Aarhus. Møllevang Church is a part of the Church of Denmark, the Danish state church, and is the parish church of Møllevang Parish. The church serves some 9000 parishioners and holds weekly sermons as well as weddings, burials and baptisms.

Møllevang Church was constructed on the initiative of pastor Axel Hjeresen who formed a committee when it became apparent it was necessary to split St. Markus Parish. Funds for the church were contributed by the parishioners of the new Møllevang Parish and public funds from the Danish state while Aarhus Municipality contributed the land. The church was raised quickly; construction was initiated 24 June 1958 and on 21 June 1959 the new church was inaugurated.

The architect C.F. Møller designed the church to unite traditional Danish church architecture with modernity. The church features a dominating roof which extends almost to the ground and an otherwise simple structure which narrows towards the altar. The only window in the church room is formed in the roof. Originally the church did not have a tower but one was added in 1968, also designed by C.F. Møller. The church and the tower are constructed of red brick. The design is kept simple with few decorations, a decision which is repeated in the interior with white walls and simple symmetry.

Møllevang Church is a Green Church (Grøn Kirke). Green Churches is a network of Danish churches dedicated to implement and further an environmentally friendly operation and climate actions in relation to the current climate crisis. The network agenda was launched by the National Council of Churches in Denmark (NCCD) in 2011.

== See also ==
- List of churches in Aarhus
