= Aarhus Methodist Church =

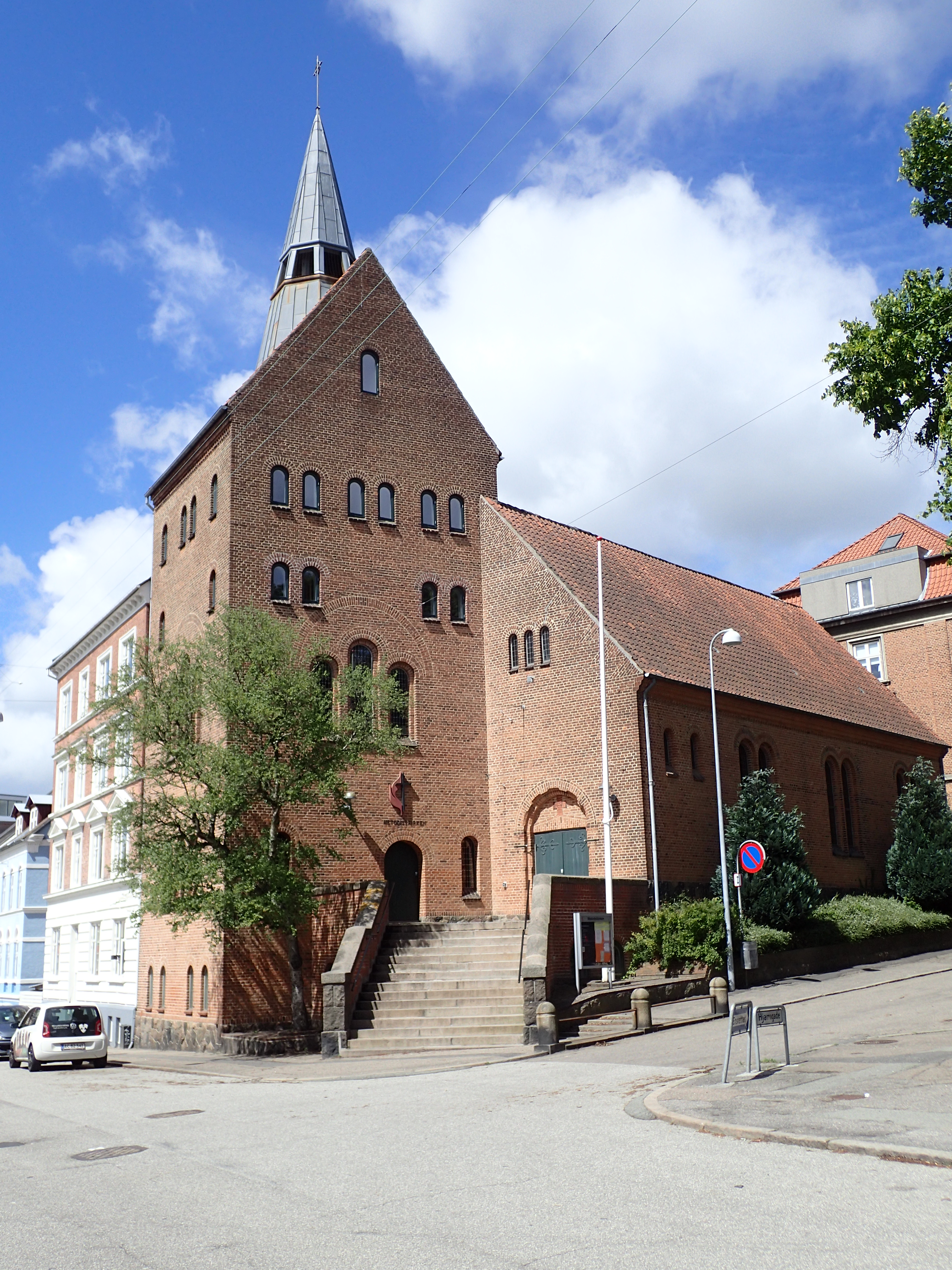
- Betlehemskirken, Aarhus Methodist Church
- Aarhus Methodist Church
- 56.1609°N 10.2021°E
- Location: Hjarnøgade 1; 8000 Aarhus C
- Country: Denmark
- Denomination: United Methodist Church

History
- Status: Church

Architecture
- Completed: 1912

Specifications
- Materials: Brick

Aarhus Methodist Church (Danish: Aarhus Metodistkirke), also known as Betlehemskirken, is a church in Aarhus, Denmark. The church is situated in Øgadekvarteret in the Vesterbro neighbourhood on the corner of Thunøgade and Hjarnøgade. Aarhus Methodist Church is a part of the United Methodist Church in Denmark and has served the Methodist congregation in Aarhus since its construction in 1912. Before the church was built, the congregation used a smaller church situated in an apartment in the alley of Posthussmøgen.

== See also ==
- List of churches in Aarhus
