= Brabrand Church =

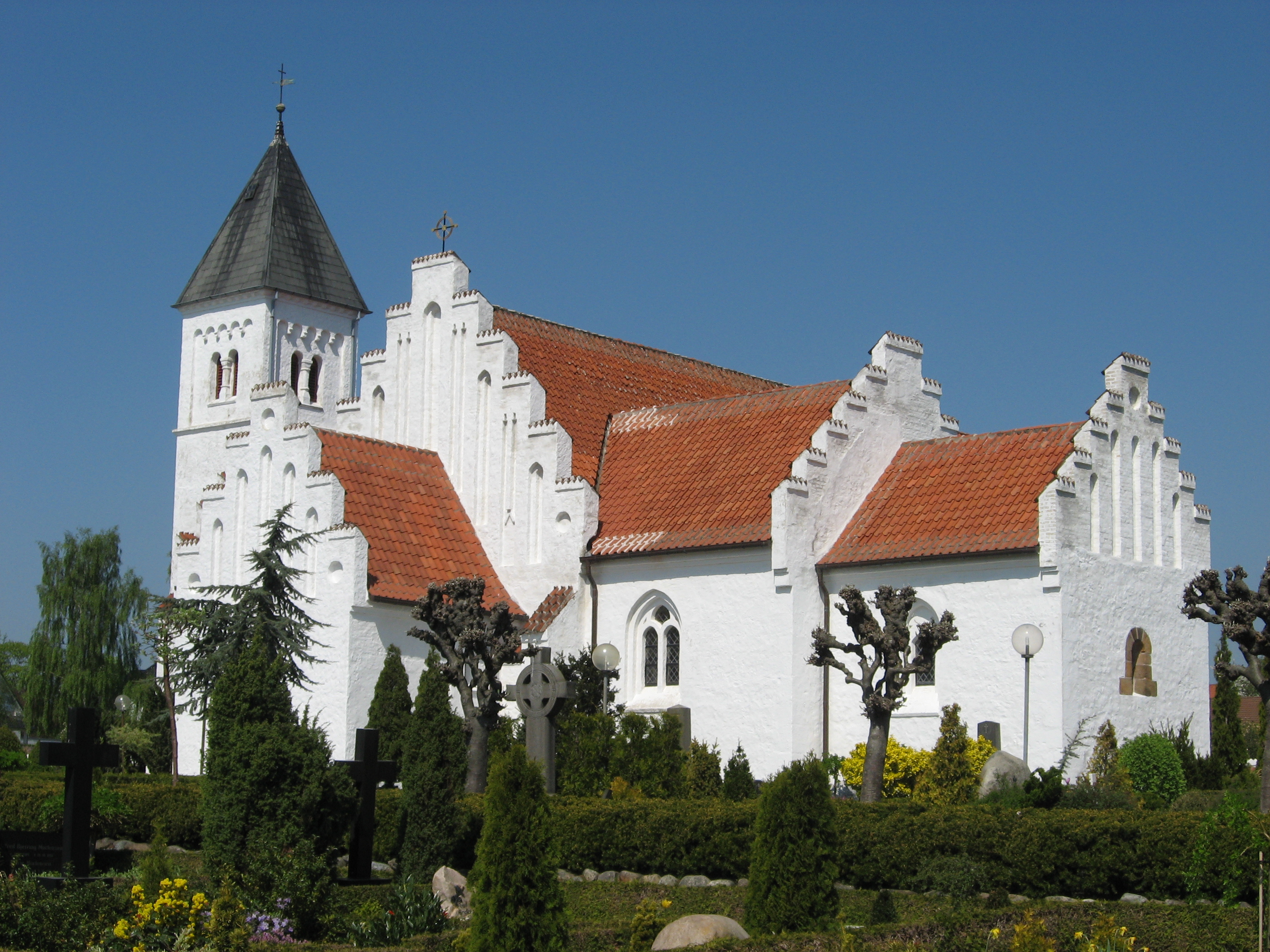
- Brabrand Church
- 56.151794°N 10.101451°E
- Location: Aarhus, Denmark
- Country: Denmark
- Denomination: Church of Denmark
- Previous denomination: Catholic Church

History
- Status: Church

Architecture
- Architectural type: Romanesque
- Completed: 12th century

Specifications
- Materials: Brick

Administration
- Archdiocese: Diocese of Aarhus

Brabrand Church (Danish: Brabrand Kirke) is a church located in Brabrand Parish in Aarhus, Denmark. The church is situated in the neighbourhood Brabrand by Brabrand Lake, west of Midtbyen. The church was originally devoted to St. Martin but is today a parish church in the Church of Denmark, serving a parish population of 6.962 (2015). The Brabrand Church pastorate is shared with the South Aarslev Church to the west. The resistance fighter Alf Tolboe Jensen, executed during the Second World War, is interred in the church cemetery.

== History ==
The church was originally situated in the village of Brabrand which has over time developed into a neighbourhood of Aarhus. Population in the parish has increased a lot which has left a substantial mark on the church as it has been altered and enlarged a number of times. It is difficult to determine which are the original part and which are later additions. The cross-hatched area in the ground-plan shows, the chancel and the east part of the nave are all that is preserved of the first stone-built church on the site. The oldest sections of the building may well date back to the latter half of the 12th century.

== Architecture ==
The oldest sections are built of rough and split granite boulders. Few original windows are still to be found in the chancel and there are moulded imposts in the chancel arch. The relatively solid brick masonry at the west end of the earlier part of the church seems to indicate that a tower, which has since disappeared, was added to the nave in the Late Middle Ages. A porch, of which a few remains may have been included in the present extension for the altar dates from the same period.

Formerly a wooden spire rose above the west end of the church but was replaced in 1880 by the present tower in its Neo-Romanesque style. In 1924—25 the church was thoroughly rebuilt and to the north side of the nave was added a large extension two bays long with a porch. This change involved a 90° turn in the orientation of the church, since the altar was set up in an annex on the south side of the original nave. A further extension was undertaken 1969–70.

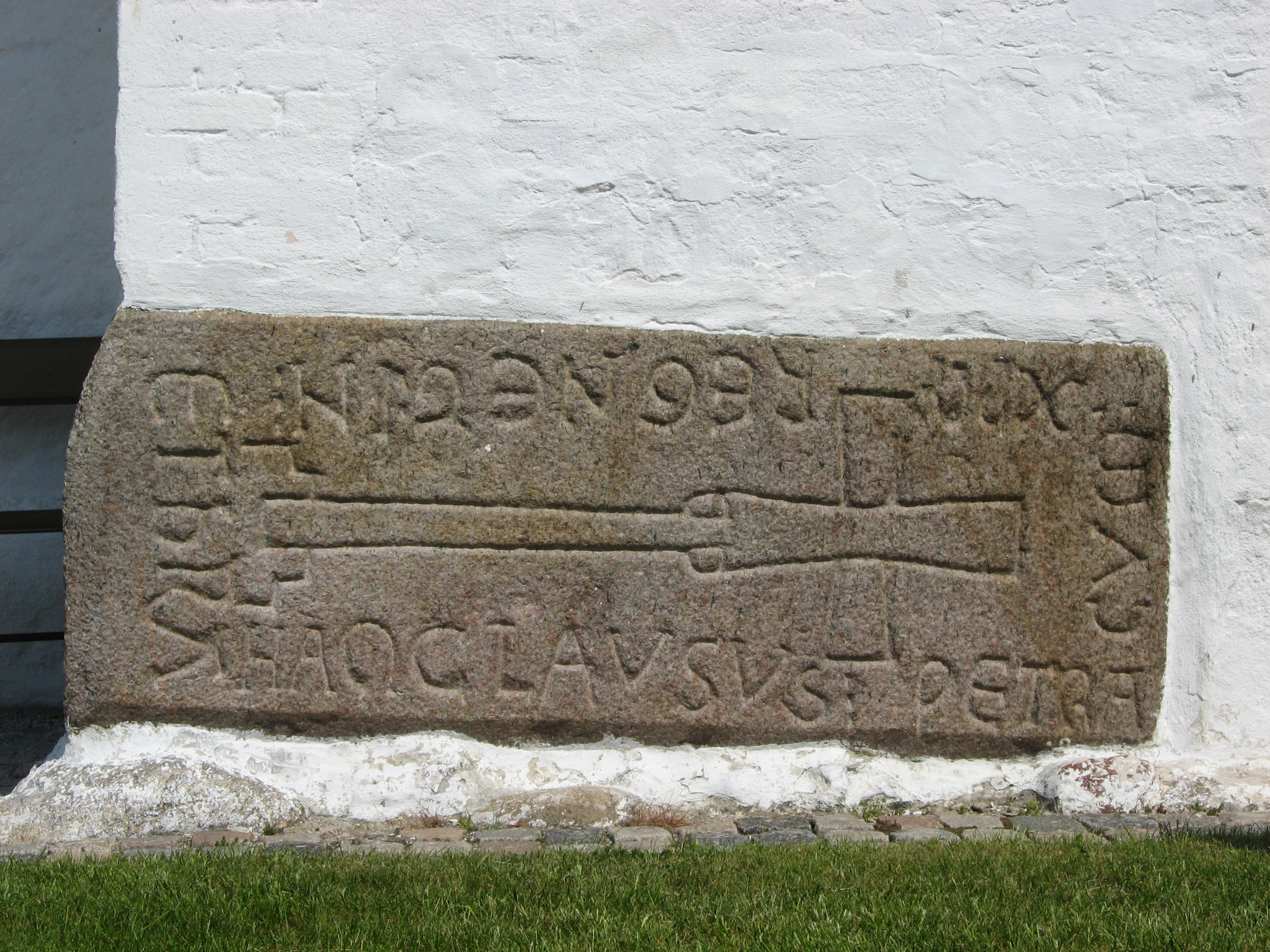
Romanesque tombstone.

In the southern wall of the church is a well-preserved romanesque gravestone with an engraved processional cross in the centre. The Latin text surrounding the cross is "HAC CLAVSVS : PETRA CVM : XRO : REGNET IN : ETHRA" roughly translated to "May he, who is interred under this stone, rule with Christ in Heaven".

== Interior ==
The walls in the chancel show traces of murals, but it was on the north wall that a fairly large fragment, since covered once more with whitewash, was found with a figured scene within a banded frame. This has been interpreted by some as Samson tearing down the gate of the city of Gaza, by others as Moses coming down the mountain with the Tablets of the Law.

The furniture was restored and added to when a considerable rebuilding programme took place in 1924–25. In particular the altarpiece which was decorated by Per Glarmester (Lit. Per Glazier) in 1595. A former altarpiece painting was produced by the animal painter Christian David Gebauer. The chalice was donated 1551 by Bishop Ove Bille (1520—36), as indicated by a tablet inscribed in Latin. A cross embroidered in gold and silver is preserved from the back of a chasuble, now disappeared, dating back to c. 1725. The pewter dish of the granite Romanesque baptismal font was made 1686 by Hans Nielsen Gotlænder, who worked in Århus, and donated to the church by the patron, Constantin von Marselis, and his wife Sofia Elisabeth Carisius. The pulpit from c. 1650 is from the same workshop as the pulpits in Åby and Trige. The bell was cast 1744 by Lorenz Strahlborn of Lübeck.

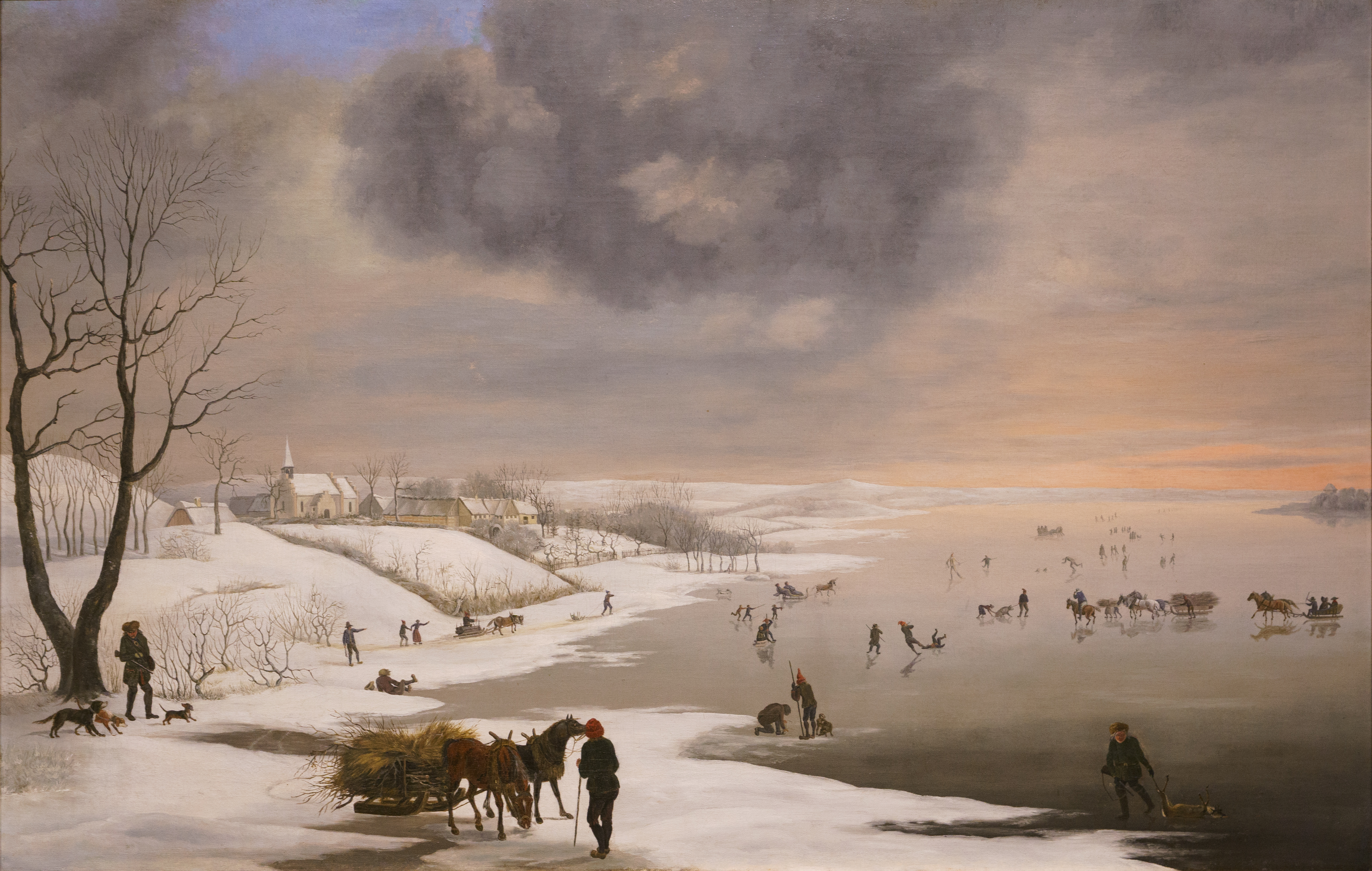
Painting by Christian David Gebauer c. 1831, Brabrand Church and Brabrand Lake.

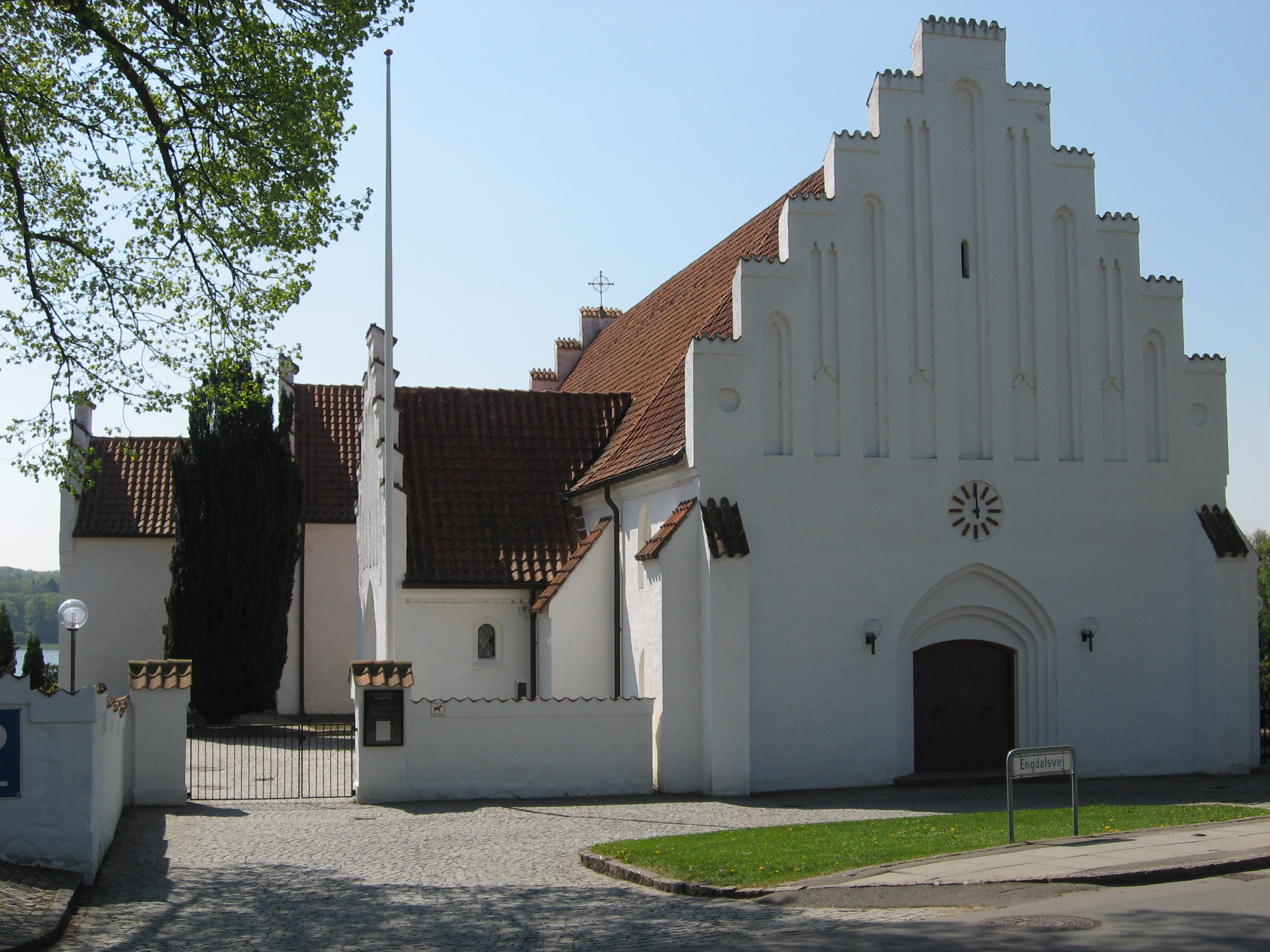
Entrance to the church

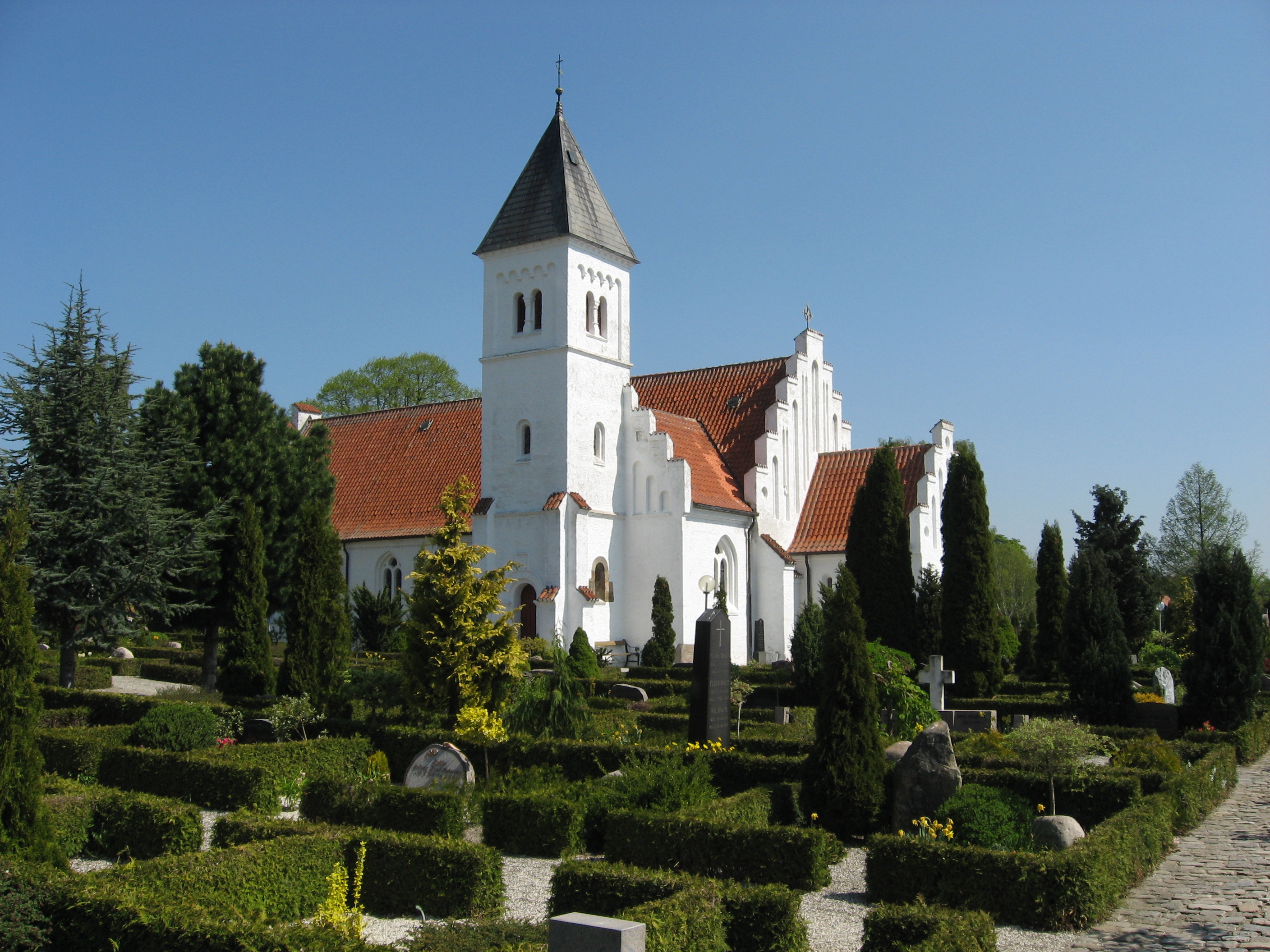
Church seen from cemetery

== See also ==
- List of Churches in Aarhus
