= Fredens Church =

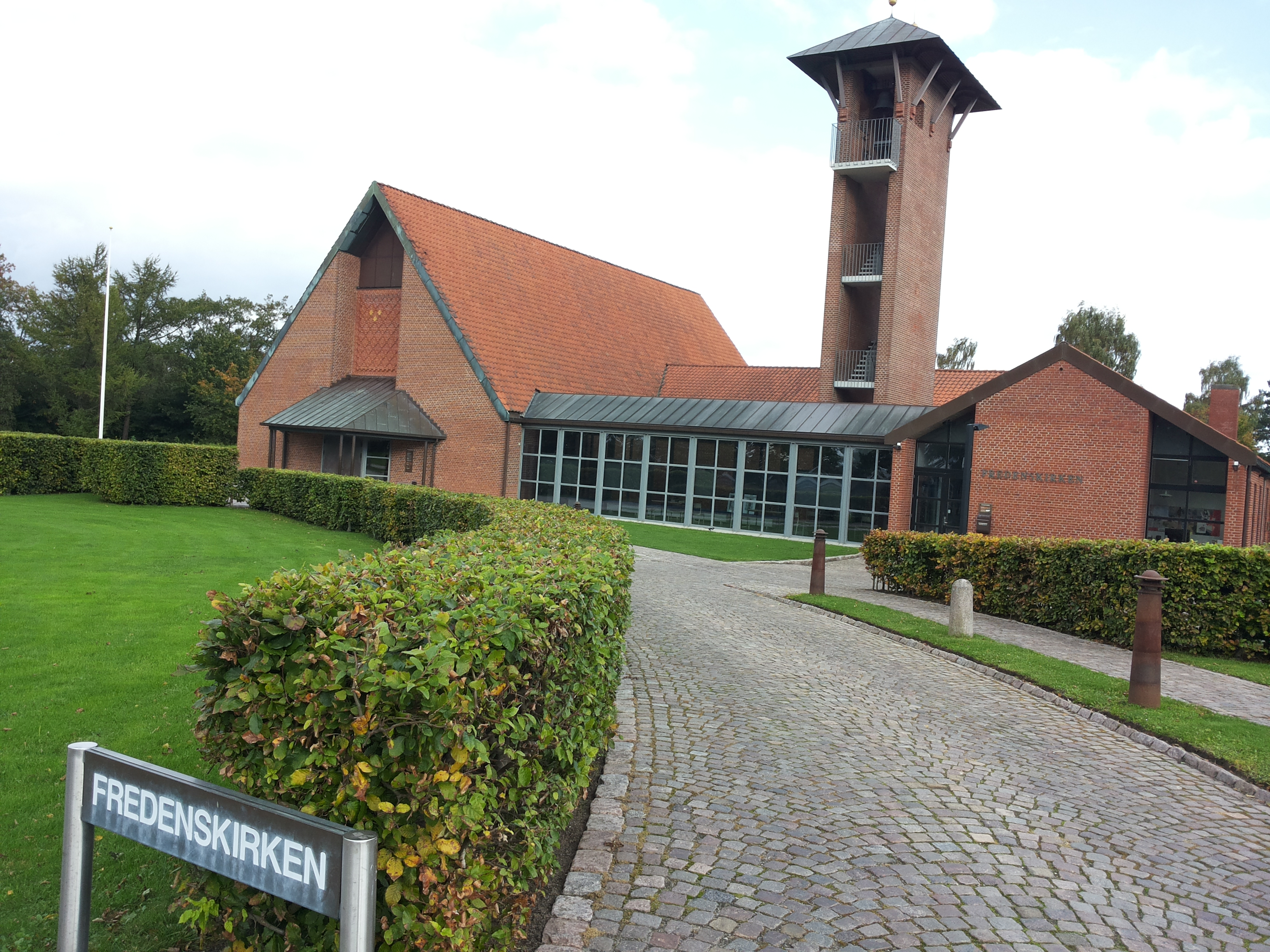
- Fredens Church
- 56.129163°N 10.183495°E
- Location: Aarhus, Denmark
- Country: Denmark
- Denomination: Church of Denmark

History
- Status: Church

Architecture
- Completed: 1960

Specifications
- Materials: Brick

Administration
- Archdiocese: Diocese of Aarhus
- Parish: Fredens Parish

Fredens Church (Danish: Fredenskirken, Peace Church) is a church in Aarhus, Denmark. The church is located in the district of Viby, 3 km south of Aarhus city centre. It is a parish church within the Church of Denmark, servicing a parish population of 7.145 (2015). Fredens Church was built between 1958 and 1960 from designs by architects F. Niclasen and Aksel Skov when Fredens Parish was created from northern areas of Viby Parish in 1960. The church features the church room, a chapel and community facilities which encloses a courtyard. The name of the church and parish means "The peace" and refers both to hope for peace following the Second World War and the Fredensvang neighbourhood the church is situated in.

Fredens Church maintains friendly relations with a Catholic church in Pesaro, Italy at the Adriatic Sea with frequent visits between the two congregations.

== Architecture ==
The church has a modern design and is constructed of red brick. The original design called for a single, large building for the main church room, a small perpendicular wing for storage and offices and a simple church tower. The tower was free standing and separated from the main church buildings. In 1986 the adjoining wing was renovated and the flat roof was made into a saddle roof with trussed rafters. In 1990 the church received a new facade of red brick, the tower was capped with a copper roof and a porch was added to the main entrance. In 1997 the parish took over the cemetery from Aarhus Municipality and a new wing with offices was added, enclosing the church tower in a courtyard.

== See also ==
- List of Churches in Aarhus
