= Egå Church =

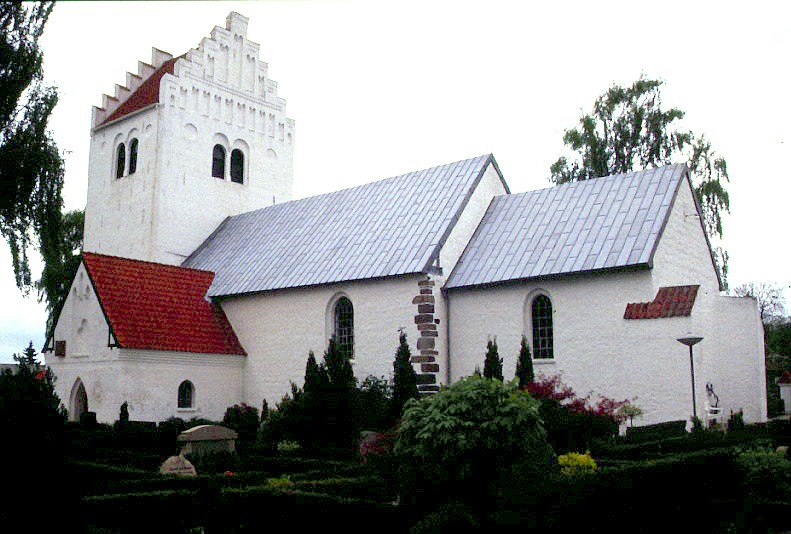
- Egå Church
- 56.216504°N 10.265259°E
- Location: Aarhus, Denmark
- Country: Denmark
- Denomination: Church of Denmark
- Previous denomination: Catholic Church

History
- Status: Church

Architecture
- Architectural type: Romanesque
- Completed: 12th century

Specifications
- Materials: Brick

Administration
- Archdiocese: Diocese of Aarhus

Egå Church (Danish: Egå Kirke) is a church located in Egå Parish in Aarhus, Denmark. The church is located 9 km north of Aarhus city centre and west of Risskov and the Bay of Aarhus. It is a parish church within the Church of Denmark with a population of 4.800 within the parish (2015). In medieval times the church was devoted to Jude the Apostle and Simon the Zealot.

Egå Church is a Green Church (Grøn Kirke). Green Churches is a network of Danish churches dedicated to implement and further an environmentally friendly operation and climate actions in relation to the current climate crisis. The network agenda was launched by the National Council of Churches in Denmark (NCCD) in 2011.

== Architecture ==
Choir and nave were erected in the 12th century in romanesque style. The walls are raw boulders with ashlar in the corners, windows and doors. The arched doors have been preserved although the northern door has been walled off and only the southern is in use. Tower and porch were erected somewhere between the 12th and 16th century in gothic style. The openings in the tower by the bell room are divided by columns, likely inspired by Aarhus Cathedral. Vaults were installed in the choir and nave around 1500. The porch has a memorial stone for the nobleman Anders Petersen (dead 1650).

The interior furniture is well-preserved. The front of the altar table is covered by a panel with a picture of King David and the seals of the bishop Ove Bille and the cantor Georg Samsing, who donated the panel. The altarpiece in renaissance style is from about 1600 with original paintings. The pulpit is considered one of the best preserved in Denmark. It has double pointy arched engravings and circles filled with tracery, dated to about 1500. The organ is new, from 1981, placed in an organ house from the late 18th century. In the choir there's a figure stone for Maren Wellomsdatter (dead 1650) and two men. The Romanesque granite baptistery has double lions around a shared head.

== See also ==
- List of Churches in Aarhus
