= Skejby Church =

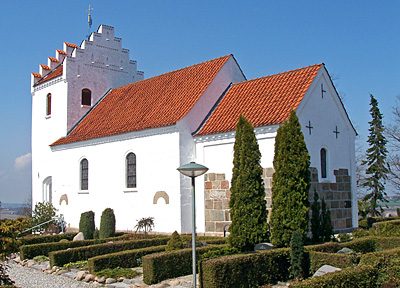
- Skejby Church
- 56.1997°N 10.1745°E
- Location: Aarhus, Denmark
- Country: Denmark
- Denomination: Church of Denmark
- Previous denomination: Catholic Church

History
- Status: Church

Architecture
- Completed: 12th century

Specifications
- Materials: Brick

Administration
- Archdiocese: Diocese of Aarhus

Skejby Church (Danish: Skejby Kirke) is a church in Skejby Parish in Aarhus, Denmark. The parish lies in Aarhus N three kilometers north-west of Aarhus city centre on the outskirts of the urban area. The parish has 816 inhabitants of which 655 are members of the Church of Denmark.

== History ==
Skejby Church was built in the 12th century but not much is known from this period. Skejby was at the time a village, since incorporated as a neighbourhood in Aarhus, and the church functioned as the local church for that village. On 26 May 1420, Skejby Church was annexed by the bishop of the Diocese of Aarhus in order to establish a parish and control the appointment of the priest. Between 1620 and 1631, the priest of Skejby Parish also became priest of the villages in Hasle and Lisbjerg. During the Swedish Wars in the 1630s and 1660s, the church suffered from pillaging and loss of tithe as members of the congregation were impoverished. The church and parish has since been controlled by Aarhus bishopric until the state confiscated it during the reformation. In 1912, it became self-owning. The parish was annexed to Aarhus in 1962, and in 1966, Lisbjerg and Hasle were separated into independent parishes.

== Church ==
The church is whitewashed with many visible granite ashlars and consists of a romanesque choir and nave. The tower with pinnacle adorned gables was built in 1910, and the whitewashed chapel in gothic style in 1904. Originally, the church had a porch but it was torn down in 1816. The church is oriented towards the sun.

== See also ==
- List of Churches in Aarhus
