= Hasle, Oslo =

Neighborhood in Oslo, Norway

Coordinates: 59°55′27″N 10°47′29″E

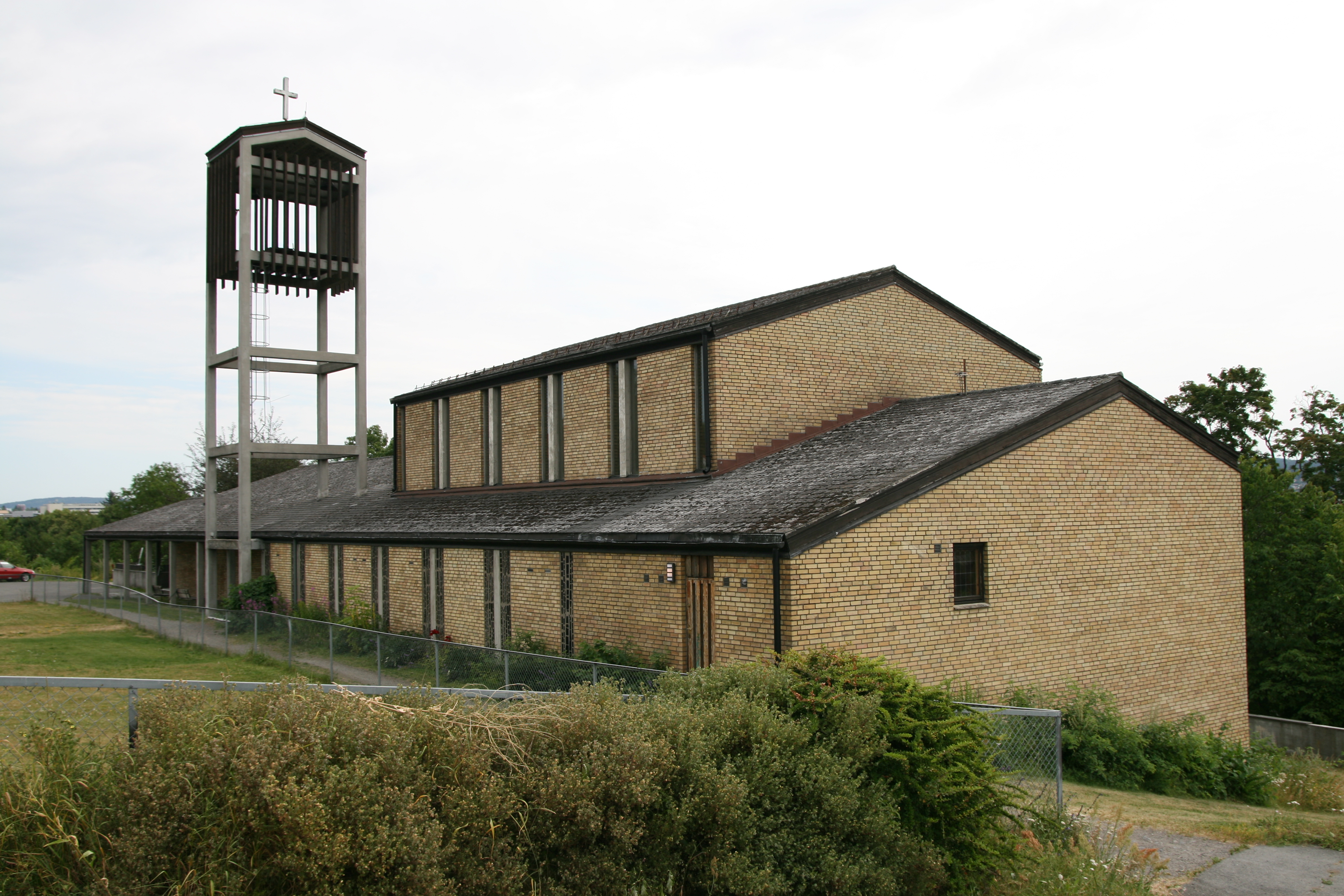
Hasle Church in July 2013.

Hasle is a neighborhood in the borough of Grünerløkka in Oslo, Norway.

It is served by the station Hasle on the Oslo Metro. Facilities include a church and the national tennis centre of Norway.
