= Hasle Church (Oslo) =

- Hasle kirke
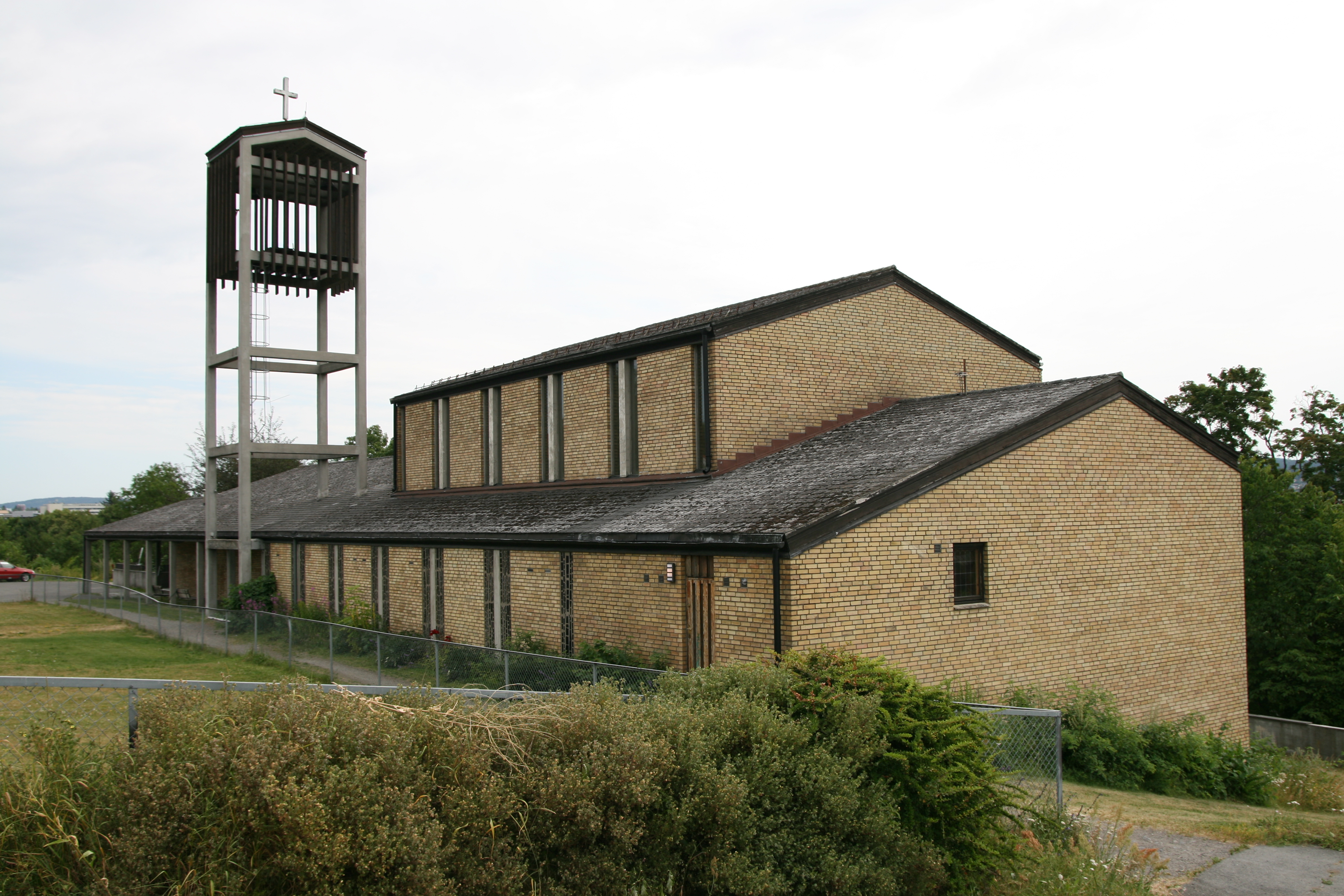

- Location within Oslo Location within Norway
- 59°55′17.123″N 10°47′3.1488″E
- Location: Eindrides vei 9 Oslo,
- Country: Norway
- Denomination: Church of Norway
- Churchmanship: Evangelical Lutheran
- Website: kirken.no/hasle

History
- Status: Parish church
- Consecrated: 1960

Architecture
- Functional status: Active
- Architect: Harald Hille

Specifications
- Capacity: 350
- Materials: Yellow brick

Administration
- Diocese: Diocese of Oslo
- Parish: Hasle

Hasle Church is a church in the neighborhood of Hasle in the city of Oslo, Norway.

The church was designed by architect Harald Hille and was consecrated by bishop Johannes Smemo on December 11, 1960. It is a yellow brick church. There is a separate bell tower. Church orientation is from northeast to southwest. The church room itself can seat about 270 people, and there is an adjoining church hall. In addition, the built-in kitchen, church room, meeting room, offices and two rooms as well as shelters. There is a small sacristy near the organ. The church organ has 14 voices and was put into service a month after the church was consecrated.

The altar tapestry was created by Kari-Bjørg Ile. A former altarpiece from a church building in central Oslo hangs on the west wall of the ward hall. The church underwent rehabilitation in 2019.

The church is listed by the Norwegian Directorate for Cultural Heritage.
