= Tranbjerg Church =

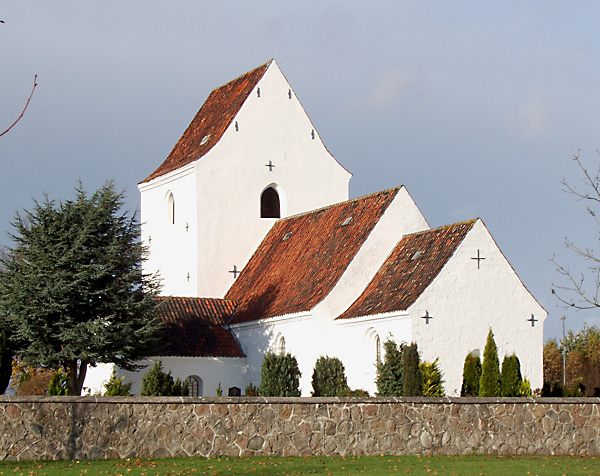
- Tranbjerg Church
- 56.0919°N 10.1349°E
- Location: Aarhus, Denmark
- Country: Denmark
- Denomination: Church of Denmark
- Previous denomination: Catholic Church

History
- Status: Church

Architecture
- Architectural type: Romanesque
- Completed: 1100s

Specifications
- Materials: Brick

Administration
- Archdiocese: Diocese of Aarhus

Tranbjerg Church is a church in Aarhus, Denmark, situated in the suburb Tranbjerg 9 kilometers south-west of Aarhus city center on the old country road between Aarhus and Horsens. Tranbjerg Church is from the 1100s, erected as a typical Danish Romanesque village church. Later additions in the 15th century added a Gothic tower and porch. Tranbjerg Church is the only church in Tranbjerg pastorate and Parish with 7.414 members of the Church of Denmark living in Tranbjerg Parish on 1 January 2016. Tranbjerg Church is devoted to St. Ursula and the 11.000 virgin handmaidens.

Tranbjerg Church is a Green Church (Grøn Kirke). Green Churches is a network of Danish churches dedicated to implement and further an environmentally friendly operation and climate actions in relation to the current climate crisis. The network agenda was launched by the National Council of Churches in Denmark (NCCD) in 2011.

== History ==
The church was originally a part of the Catholic church but it was confiscated by Danish crown after the Reformation. In 1687 the crown gave Tranbjerg Church to baron Constantin Marselis as payment for debts incurred during the Swedish Wars. When Constantin Marselis died the church was inherited by his widow Elisbeth Charisius in 1699 who made it a part of the estate of the manor Constantinsborg. In 1799 the church was sold on auction to the church parishioners. Tranbjerg Church is today a part of the Church of Denmark.

== Architecture ==
The original part of the church, the chancel and nave, probably dates from the latter half of the 12th century and is constructed of split and rough granite boulders. Ashlar is used at the windows, doors and the corners of the building. Some time in the Late Middle Ages the tower and porch was added and the flat, wooden ceiling was replaced by a groin vault. The altar tablet from the 1400s feature a depiction of St. Ursula along with Virgin Mary, the Jesus child and John the Apostle. The pulpit is from 1675-1700 and was renovated in 1998.
