= Christian David Gebauer =

Danish painter

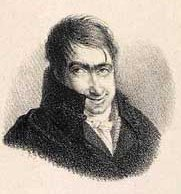
Christian David Gebauer; caricature by unknown artist (c. 1800)

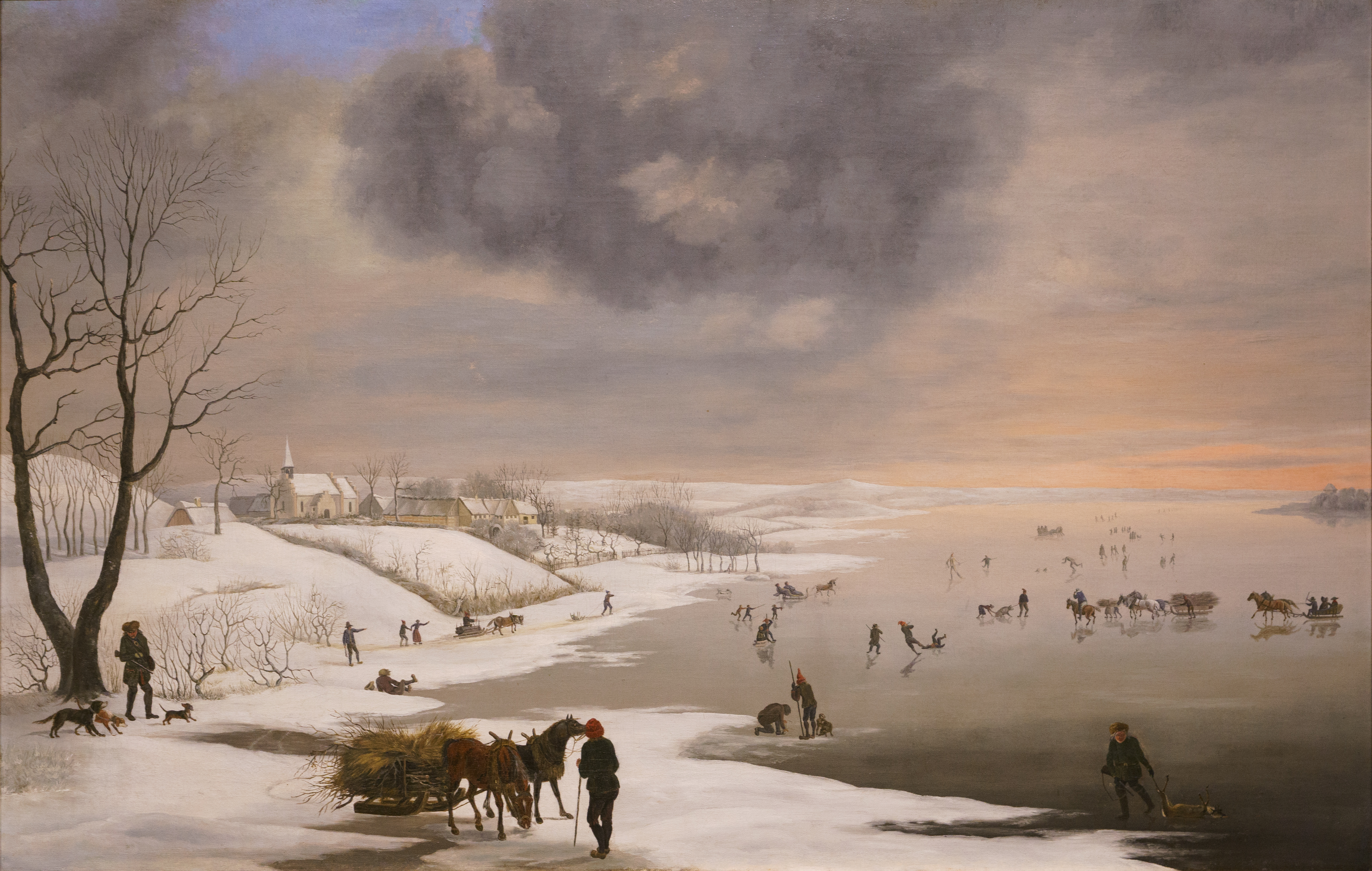
Winter Landscape near Brabrand Church (ca. 1831)

Christian David Gebauer (15 October 1777 – 15 September 1831) was a Danish animal and landscape painter. He was also known for etchings.

== Biography ==
Gebauer was born in Neusalz an der Oder. His father was superintendent of the Moravian Church. When he was still very young, his family moved to Christiansfeld in Schleswig. Although his father had wanted him to become a priest, he contracted measles at the age of three and his hearing was permanently damaged.

After he displayed some talent for drawing, it was decided that he should enroll at the Royal Danish Academy of Fine Arts, where he studied with C.A. Lorentzen. His primary inspiration, however, came from the Dutch Masters. He exhibited his student works, a mix of ink drawings and oils, and captured the attention of Nicolai Abildgaard. Shortly after, Count Reventlow became his sponsor.

During 1807, the beginning of the Gunboat War aroused his interest in battle painting, so he applied for Royal travel benefits, which were eventually granted. In 1813, he used some of his money to travel to Germany, where he witnessed the aftermath of the Battle of Dresden. He was particularly attracted to the captive Cossacks and their horses, which resulted in a number of drawings and etchings.

He was named a member of the Royal Academy in 1815. Two years later, he was given an apartment at Charlottenborg Palace and an annual pension. He lived there for many years and painted at several Royal properties throughout Denmark, creating architectural works (such as overdoors) in addition to his oils.

In 1826–27, he made a trip to Bavaria, but the journey proved to be too taxing for his steadily declining health. While staying in Munich, he received news that his wife had died. Upon returning, he learned that three of his grown children had also died. He then relocated to Aarhus, where he lived with a surviving daughter and her husband, and opened a drawing school. In 1830, he was appointed a Professor, but died without assuming his duties.

He died on 15 September 1831, in Aarhus.

== Personal life ==
He was married in 1807 to Mariane Høegh (ca. 1780–1827). The composer Johan Christian Gebauer was their son.
