= Christian's Church, Aarhus =

Christians's Church
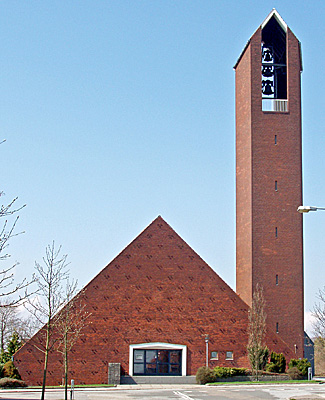
- Christians's Church
- Christians's Church
- 56.1776°N 10.1956°E
- Location: Frederikshaldsgade 15; 8200 Aarhus N
- Country: Denmark
- Denomination: Church of Denmark

History
- Status: Church

Architecture
- Completed: 1958

Specifications
- Materials: Brick

Administration
- Archdiocese: Diocese of Aarhus

Christians's Church (Danish: Christianskirken) is a church in Aarhus, Denmark. The church is situated in the northern Christiansbjerg neighbourhood on Frederikshaldsgade. It is a parish church, and the only church in Christians Parish, under the Diocese of Aarhus and within the Church of Denmark, the Danish state church. The church serves some 14.000 parishioners in Christians Parish and holds weekly sermons along with weddings, burials and baptisms.

The present Christians's Church was inaugurated on 2 March, 1958. The congregation in Christiansbjerg had for some years made do with a crypt, built during the Second World War, which had doubled as a temporary church. The crypt church replaced an older Christian's Church which had been in use since 1913 to 1946. The old church was found too small with just 90 seats, and an architects' contest was established in 1937 to find a design for a new church. The contest was won by Aage C. Nielsen. A committee led by the bishop of the Diocese of Aarhus started raising funds for the new church but war and occupation delayed the project. The funds were used to build the crypt church which had to double as a church until the 1950s.

Minister of Ecclesiastical Affairs Bodil Koch made the project a priority and construction on the new church began in 1957. The resulting church was characteristic with sharp lines and a hexagonal church tower. The porch is low and leads into a large, tall church room which can seat 500 people. The church room stretches to the roof with the aid of buttresses which gives the otherwise modernistic church a gothic element. The south wall is one large window which is the main source of light. The church exterior is made of red brick.

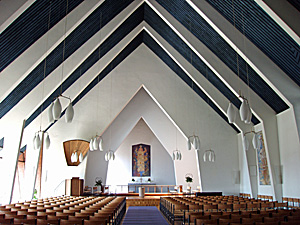
Choir

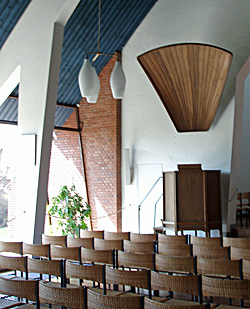
Pulpit

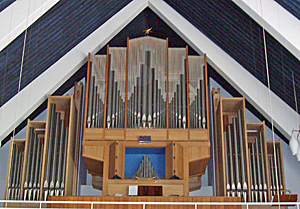
Organ

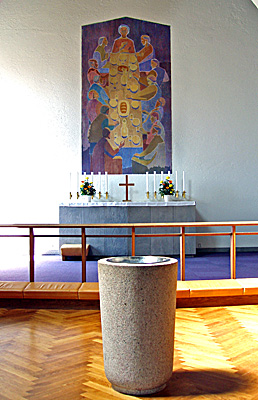
Baptismal font

== See also ==
- List of churches in Aarhus
