= Vejlby Church =

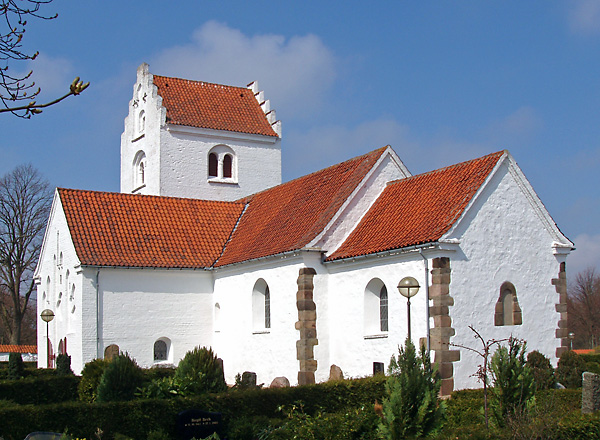
- Vejlby Church
- 56.195497°N 10.212541°E
- Location: Aarhus, Denmark
- Country: Denmark
- Denomination: Church of Denmark
- Previous denomination: Catholic Church

History
- Status: Church

Architecture
- Architectural type: Romanesque
- Completed: 1100s

Specifications
- Materials: Brick

Administration
- Archdiocese: Diocese of Aarhus

Vejlby Church (Danish: Vejlby Kirke) is a church located in Vejlby Parish in Aarhus, Denmark. The church is situated 2 kilometres (1.2 mi) north of Aarhus city centre, west of Risskov and the Bay of Aarhus, on the morainal hills of the Egå valley, with a view of Kalø Vig and Helgenæs. It is a parish church belonging to the Church of Denmark. The parish has a population of 7,148 (2015).

== History ==
Vejlby Church in medieval times belonged to the canon administration under Aarhus Cathedral. Following the Reformation, the church was confiscated by the state and on 29 April 1720 it was given to a merchant from Aarhus. The merchant died in 1741 but the church stayed in the family until 1770 when it was sold to the Aarhus County administrator. It was transferred many times in the following years until Anders Rasmussen in Brendstrup and Christian Faurschou bought it in 1784. In 1810 the parish tithe was sold to the landowners within the parish. The church became an independent institution within the Church of Denmark in 1911.

Vejlby Church originally did not have its own priest. The canon administration in Aarhus Cathedral appointed officials to serve as priests up to 1680 when the last canon died. The church was subsequently annexed to the chaplain in the cathedral where it stayed until the early 19th century. In 1803 it was decided that Vejlby parish should become a separate pastorate upon the next vacancy which occurred in 1811 and the parish has since had its own priest. The church cemetery is associated with a myth similar to the Bible story of Jephthah. Allegedly the builder of the cemetery promised to bury the first living being he met after construction had been completed; it happened to be his son.

== Architecture ==
The nave and choir are in Romanesque style constructed of boulders with ashlar around the corners, windows and doors. In the late medieval period the church was renovated. A Gothic tower and porch, and vaults in the nave, were added. According to an inscription it was Bishop Niels Clausen (bishop 1490–1520) who in 1492 was responsible for the renovation. The church is decorated with frescos from the same period.

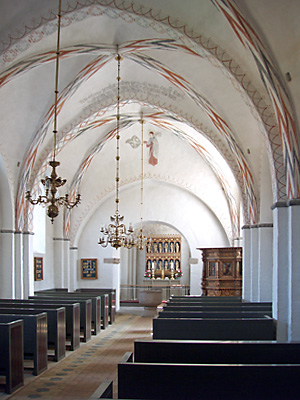
The nave

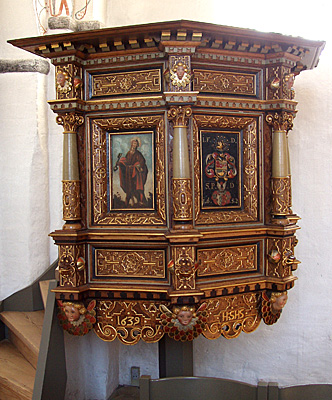
The Renaissance pulpit from 1639

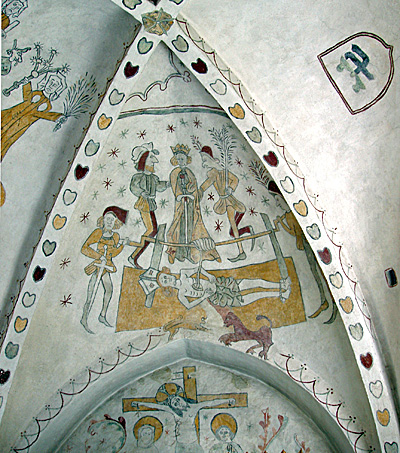
Mural depicting Erasmus of Formia

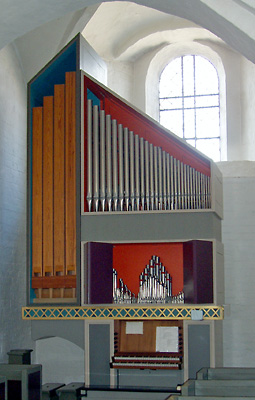
Organ from the 1960s

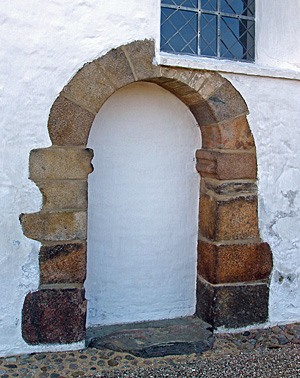
Walled off northern door

== See also ==
- List of Churches in Aarhus
