= Hasle Church =

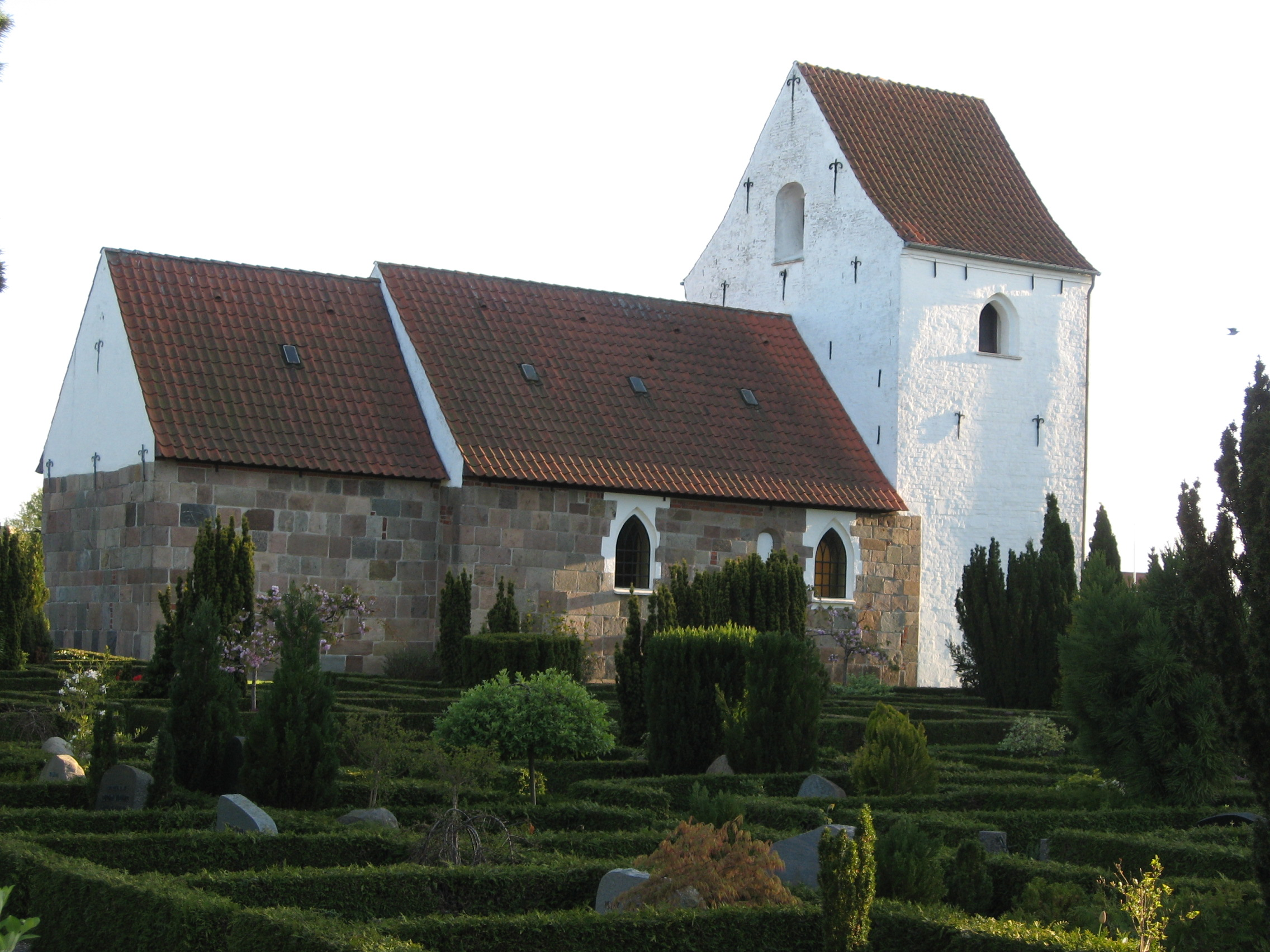
- Hasle Church
- 56.169672°N 10.161208°E
- Location: Aarhus, Denmark
- Country: Denmark
- Denomination: Church of Denmark
- Previous denomination: Catholic Church

History
- Status: Church

Architecture
- Architectural type: Romanesque
- Completed: 12th century

Specifications
- Materials: Brick

Administration
- Archdiocese: Diocese of Aarhus
- Parish: Hasle Parish

Hasle Church (Danish: Hasle Kirke) is a church located in Hasle Parish in Aarhus, Denmark. The church is located 3 km. west of Aarhus city centre and north of Åbyhøj. It is a parish church within the Church of Denmark servicing a parish population of 7.515 (2015).

== Architecture ==
The original building was erected in the mid-12th century in romanesque style. The walls are constructed of raw boulders with ashlar in the corners, windows and doorways. The north wall has two preserved, original windows while the north door and a window on the east wall has been walled off. The church porch was built in 1871–72 in place of an older half-timbered building and in 2005 the porch was widened to make the original granite reliefs visible.

The church is notable for its intricate stonemasonry. The original reliefs in the porch includes a tympanum depicting Jesus Christ on the cross, lions fighting dragons and people and a head with a halo at the left base of the entryway. In the south corner of the tower sits a granite ashlar decorated with reliefs, thought to be from the walled off north door. The relief depicts a man holding his right hand behind the skirt of a woman while the woman is reaching through the stone for a ring in the mouth of a person with the head of a horse. Both man and woman holds their left hands up to their ears as if listening.

== See also ==
- List of Churches in Aarhus
