= Risskov Church =

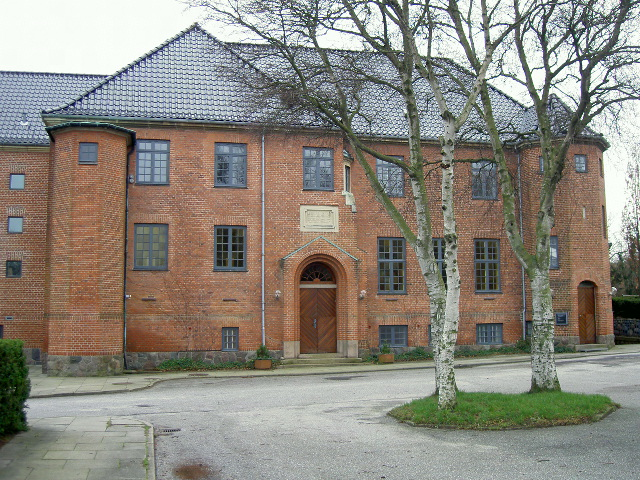
- Risskov Church
- 56.1885°N 10.2362°E
- Location: Solbakken 2; 8240 Risskov
- Country: Denmark
- Denomination: Church of Denmark

History
- Status: Church

Architecture
- Completed: 1922

Specifications
- Materials: Brick

Administration
- Archdiocese: Diocese of Aarhus

Risskov Kirke is a church located in the Risskov Parish of the Danish city, Aarhus.The Risskov Parish separated from the Vejlby Parish 30 November 1940.

The Church was originally built in 1922 as a villa for chocolatier Fritz George Clausen (1871-1927), founder of the chocolate factory Elvirasminde, and was designed by architect Vilhelm Puck. After the death of Clausen's widow in 1933, her heirs donated the Villa to the recently formed Risskov Church Committee, fulfilling a wish she had expressed to her relatives before her death. The villa was adapted by architect Aksel Skov and the Church was consecrated on the first Sunday of Advent, 2 December 1934. The present chancel was added in 1968. The Church was rededicated to Bishop Kjeld Holm in 1999.

A glass mosaic in the east end serves as the altarpiece.

== See also ==
- List of Churches in Aarhus
