= Frijsenborg =

Manor house and estate in Jutland, Denmark

Coordinates: 56°15′53″N 09°53′41″E

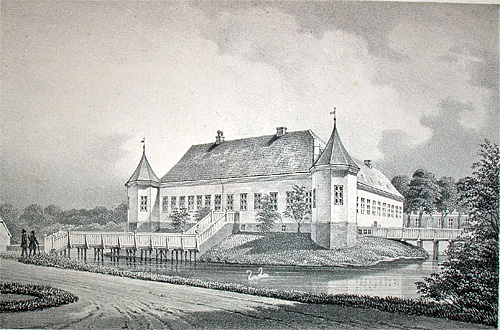
Frijsenborg

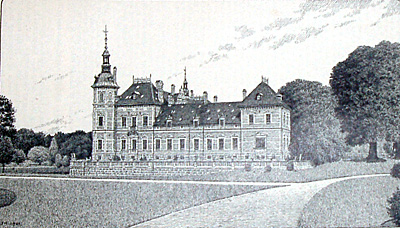
Frijsenborg (1901)

Frijsenborg is a manor house and estate near Hammel, 27 km (17 mi) northwest of Aarhus in Jutland, Denmark. The first manor on the site known as Jernit was built by Valdemar Parberg in 1583. After the statesman Mogens Friis acquired the property in 1672, the manor was rebuilt at the end of the 17th century. In the 1860s, it was considerably expanded and redesigned in the Renaissance style.

== History and architecture ==
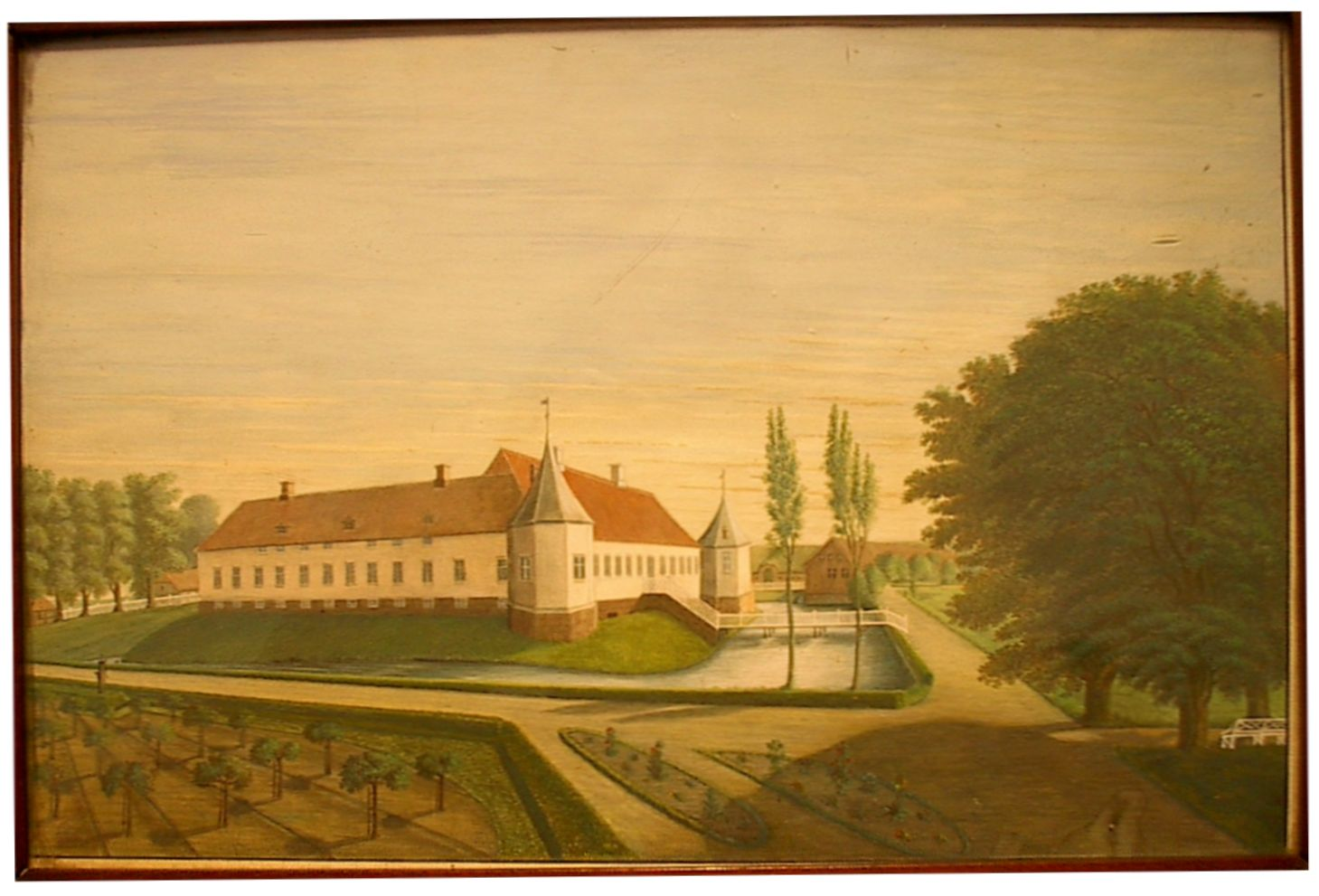
Frijsenborg c. 1830

The property stands on the site of the former village of Jernit which had existed since the 15th century. In 1558, King Christian III gave orders for Jernit Parish to be combined with Hammel Parish which required Jernit Church to be demolished. In 1583, the king transferred ownership of the village to the nobleman Valdemar Parsberg who demolished all its buildings. In their place, he constructed a Baroque manor surrounded by a moat which he called Jernit.

The Danish county of Frijsenborg consisting of Jernit, Tulstrup, Lyngballegård, Hagshom and Østergård, was established in 1672 by the Crown for Mogens Friis (1623–1675) a high-ranking statesman, in order to compensate him for losses he had incurred in the Dano-Swedish War (1658–60). The county became one of the largest in Denmark, covering an area of 450 km^{2} (170 sq mi). Friis renamed the manor house Frijsenborg.

== Renaissance renovation ==
Count Christian Emil Krag-Juel-Vind-Frijs, who acquired the estate in 1849, commissioned the architect Ferdinand Meldahl (1827–1908) to redesign, modernize and expand the building into a luxurious manor house in the Renaissance style. Three new wings were added as well as tall steepled towers although the walls of the original ground floor were maintained. A new storey was added to the west wing while two-storied pavilions were built on the south and north wings. The work was completed in 1867. Today's building is considered to be one of the finest examples of Renaissance Revival architecture in Denmark.

In 1880, the count's son Mogens returned from England, bringing with him experience of the English nobility's lifestyle which he applied to the manor, fitting it our with palatial furnishings and decorations. Since 1982, the property has been owned by Bendt Tido Hannibal Wedell. The building can be seen from the road but is not open to the public.
