= Carmelite Priory, Copenhagen =

Danish Carmelite college

The Carmelite Priory, Copenhagen, was a small Carmelite college in Copenhagen, Denmark, in existence between 1497 and 1529, with connections to the University of Copenhagen.

== History ==
In 1497 the Carmelite priory in Helsingør purchased a property near the University of Copenhagen as a "college" where the brothers could live and lecture. Nothing more is mentioned about it until 1517 when Christian II gave the income of St. George's Leper Hospital to the Carmelites for the maintenance of a doctor or bachelor of theology to teach at the university. The next year the property was converted to a residence and lecture hall for the priests and brethren. In 1519 the Carmelites received an income property next to St. Peder's Church. Dr. Christiern Andersen, who was the prior provincial, became the professor of theology at the University of Copenhagen. The Carmelite foundation is referred to as a "monastery college" in 1519. The Carmelites invited Cistercians into the college to lecture from time to time.

A superintendent, Poul Helgesen, was appointed to oversee the priory, an appointment that was to have profound consequences. Though not himself a Lutheran, Helgesen was keenly observant of the effects Lutheran teaching had on ordinary Danes. In 1522 he preached at Copenhagen Castle chapel in the presence of Christian II. He took as his text the beheading of John the Baptist and took the occasion to warn the king of the similarities between his conduct and Herod's. Just eight days later the income from St. George's Hospital was revoked by the king, and Helgesen fled for his life. Without the income, the Carmelites were obliged to give up the college functions and became a small and very poor priory.

In 1529 Frederick I abolished the priory entirely by giving its income to Knud Gyldenstierne. In 1530 Frederick made over the former Carmelite priory property to the same Gyldenstierne because the friars had abandoned it and withdrawn to their house at Helsingør.

No trace of the priory building remains.

== Sources ==
- Nielsen, Dr. Oluf, 1877: Kjøbenhavn i Middelalderen. Copenhagen: G. E. C. Gads Forlag; text available online at Kjøbenhavn i Middelalderen (kap. XVI: Klostre og Hospitaler) (in Danish)
