= Hans Tausen's Church =

- Hans Tausens Kirke
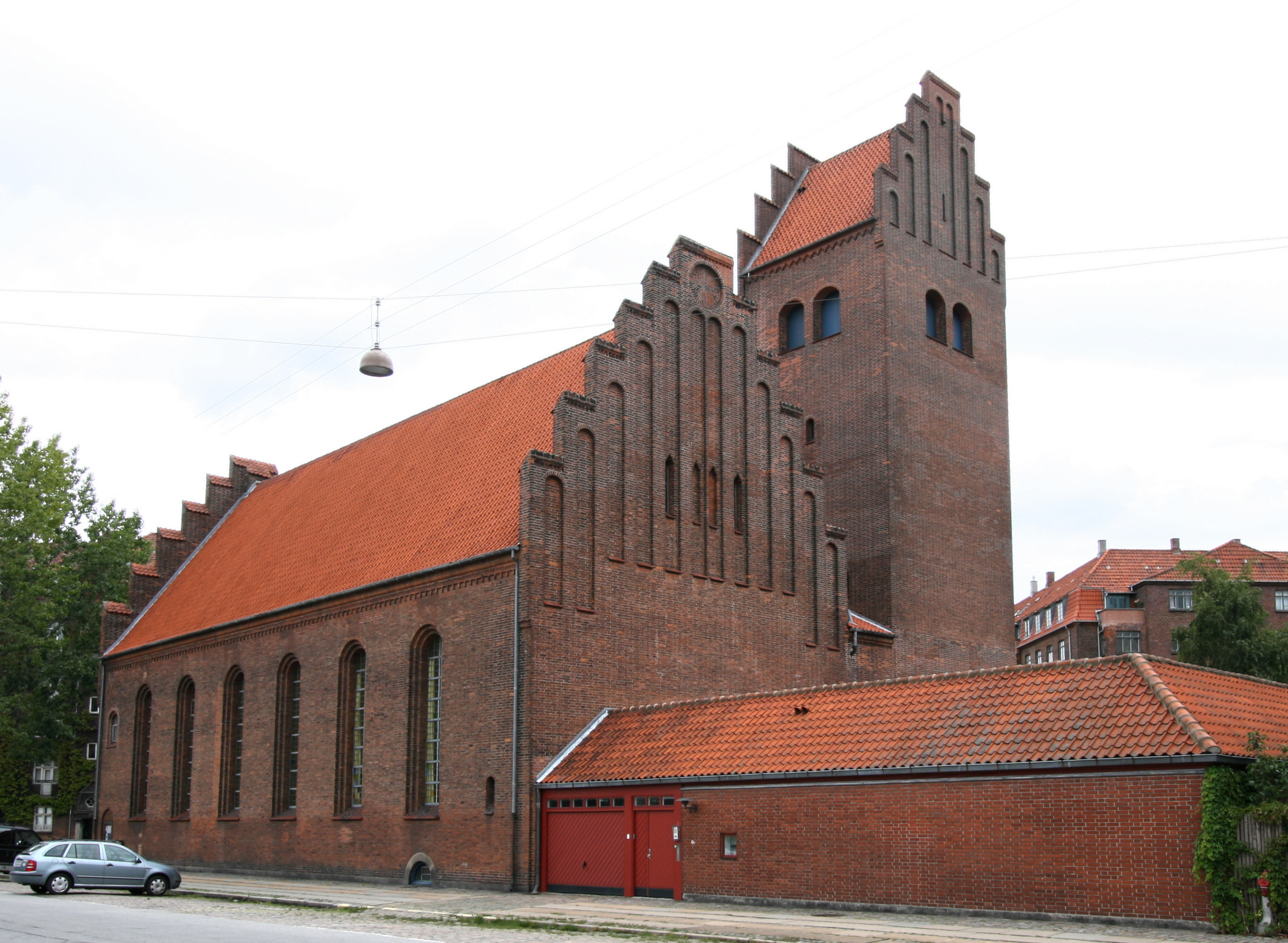
- Hans Tausen's Church
- Hans Tausen's Church
- 55°39′53.13″N 12°34′36.06″E
- Location: 4 Halfdansgade; Copenhagen
- Country: Denmark
- Denomination: Church of Denmark

History
- Status: Church

Architecture
- Architect(s): Fredrik Appel and Kristen Gording
- Architectural type: Church
- Completed: 1924

Specifications
- Materials: Brick

Administration
- Archdiocese: Diocese of Copenhagen

Hans Tausen's Church (Danish: Hans Tausens Kirke) is a Church of Denmark parish church in the Islands Brygge neighbourhood of Copenhagen, Denmark. It is named after Hans Tausen, the leading theologian of the Danish Reformation.

== History ==
Islands Brygge Parish was disjoined from Christianshavn Parish on 20 December 1915. A temporary church hall, the current congregation hall (Menighedssal), was inaugurated that same year.

The current church was designed by Fredrik Appel and Kristen Gording. The foundation stone was set on 27 May 1923 and the church was inaugurated on 30 November 1924. The tower was not built until 1936.

== Architecture ==
The church is built in red brick. The interior stands in white-washed brick.

== Culture ==
Hans Tausen's church facilitates the use of its infrastructure to cultural groups such as the Chamber Choir Musica.
