= Skibby (disambiguation) =

Skibby is a town in Denmark. Skibby may also refer to:

== People ==
- Hans Kristian Skibby (born 1969), Danish politician
- Jesper Skibby (born 1964), Danish road racing cyclist
- Karina Skibby (born 1965), Danish road cyclist
- Willy Skibby (born 1942), Danish cyclist

== Other uses ==
- Skibby Chronicle, Danish chronicle
