= Sankt Peders Stræde =

Street in Copenhagen, Denmark

Coordinates: 55.6792°N 12.5692°E

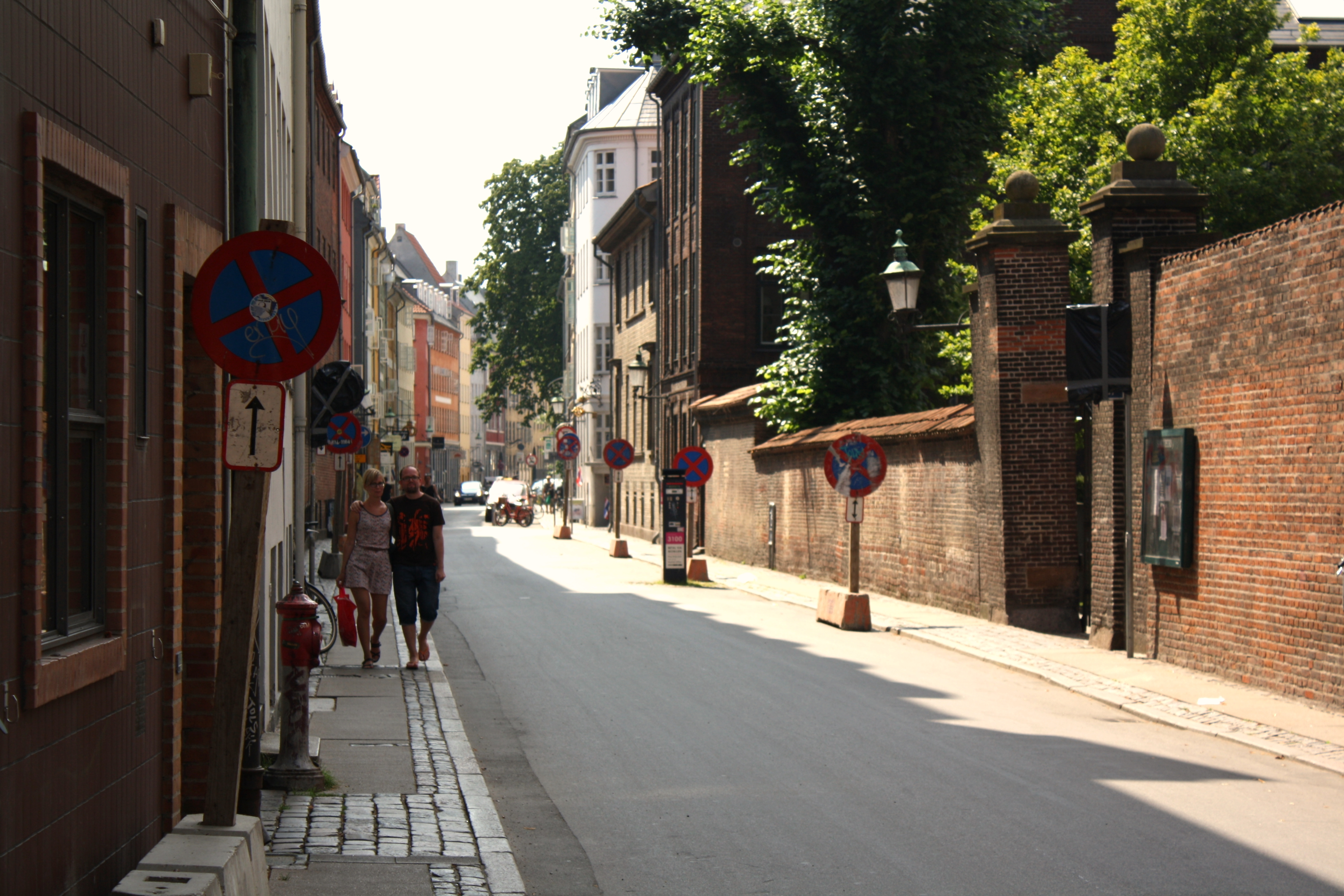
A view down Sankt Peders Stræde

Sankt Peder Stræde is a street in central Copenhagen, Denmark. It runs from Nørregade to Jarmers Plads, crossing Larsbjørnsstræde, Teglgårdsstræde and Larslejsstræde on the way. The eponymous St. Peter's Church is located at the beginning of the street, on the corner with Nørregade. Most of its other buildings date from the years after the Copenhagen Fire of 1795. Part of Copenhagen's Latin Quarter, the street is home to several well-known restaurants and shops.

== History ==
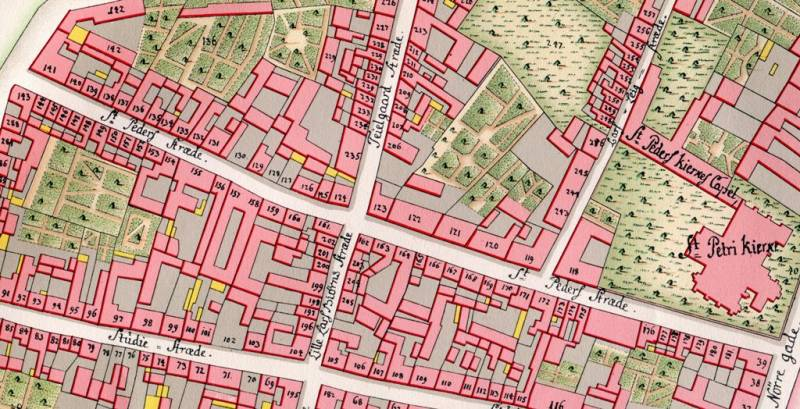
Sankt Peders Stræde as seen on Gedde's Map of the North Quarter, 1757

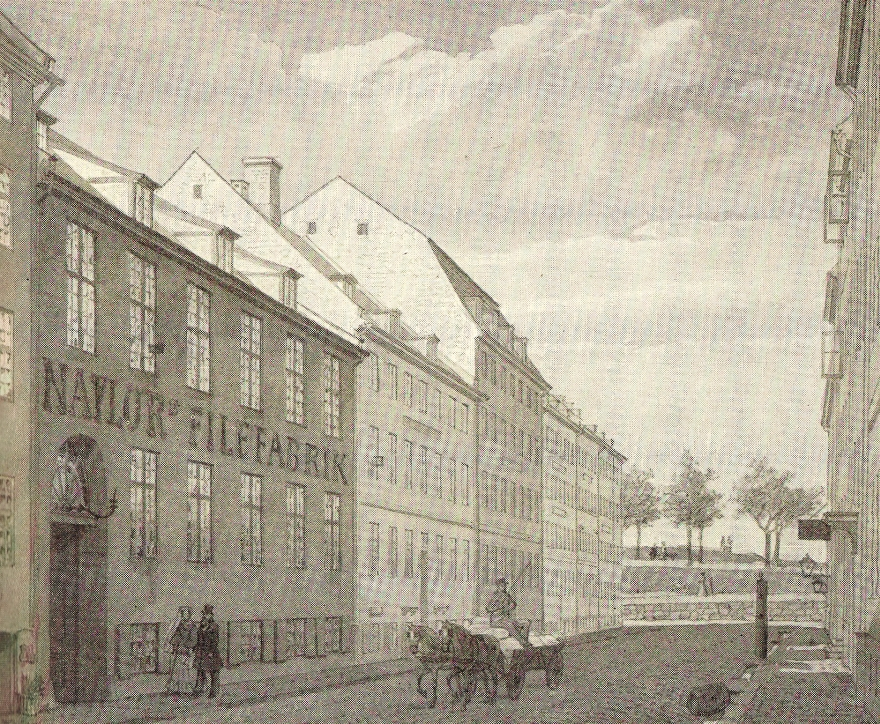
Sankt Peders Stræde by H. G. F. Holm

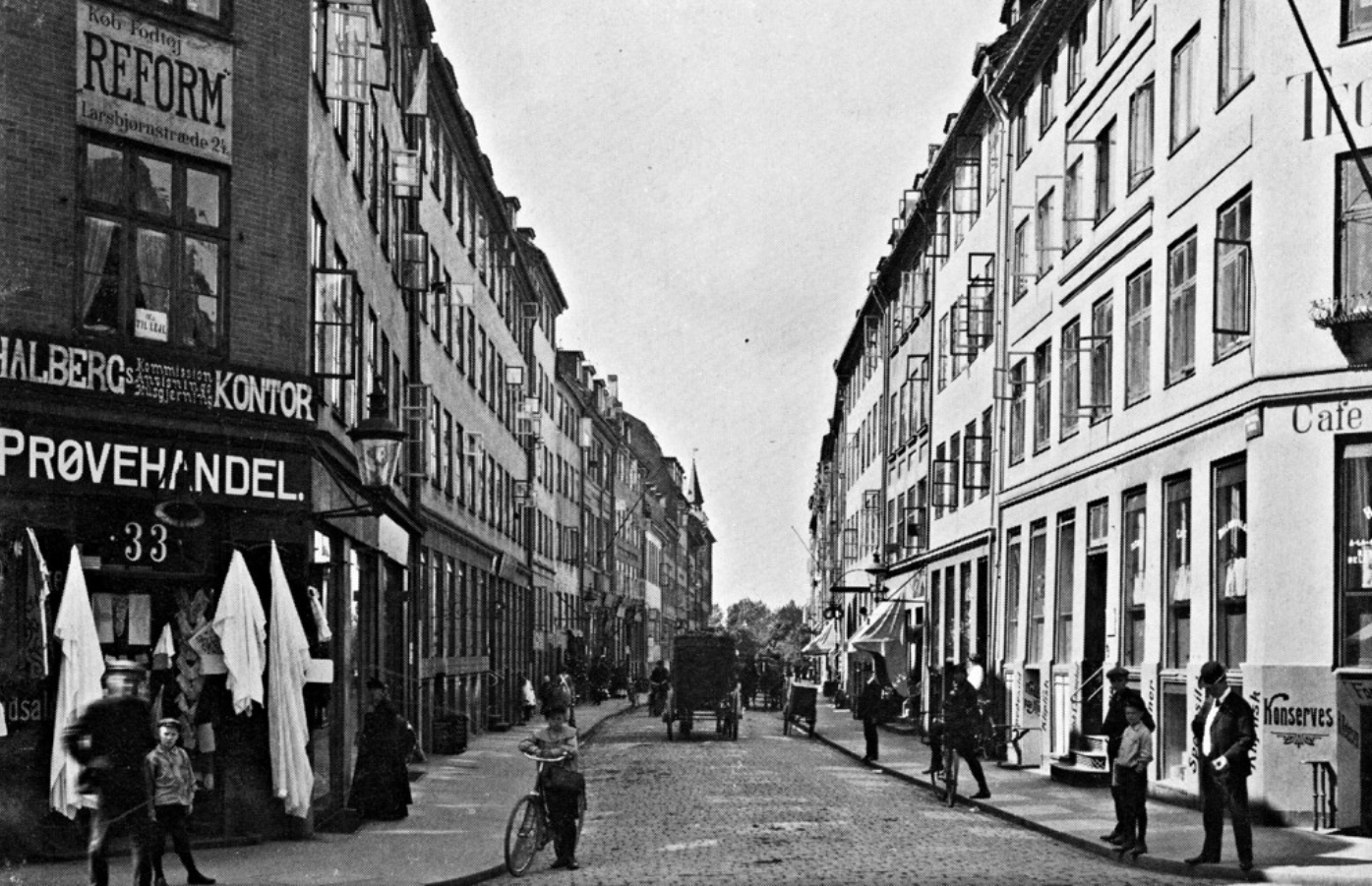
Sankt Peders Stræde, 1909

Sankt Peder Stræde takes its name after St. Peter's Church, which is first mentioned in 1304. In 1497 the Carmelite priory in Helsingør purchased a property in the street to use it as a "college" where the brothers could live and lecture. It had connections with the University of Copenhagen which was then located on the corner of Studiestræde and Nørregade. The Carmelite college was shut down after the Reformation.

The street was almost completely destroyed in the Copenhagen Fire of 1795. The houses in the street were subsequently rebuilt. The residents were mainly minor merchants and craftsmen. Copenhagen's Western Rampart was located at the far end of the street until the second half of the 19th century. A pedestrian bridge, Teglgårdsbroen, was constructed across the City Moat in 1855. It disappeared in 1874.

== Notable buildings and residents ==
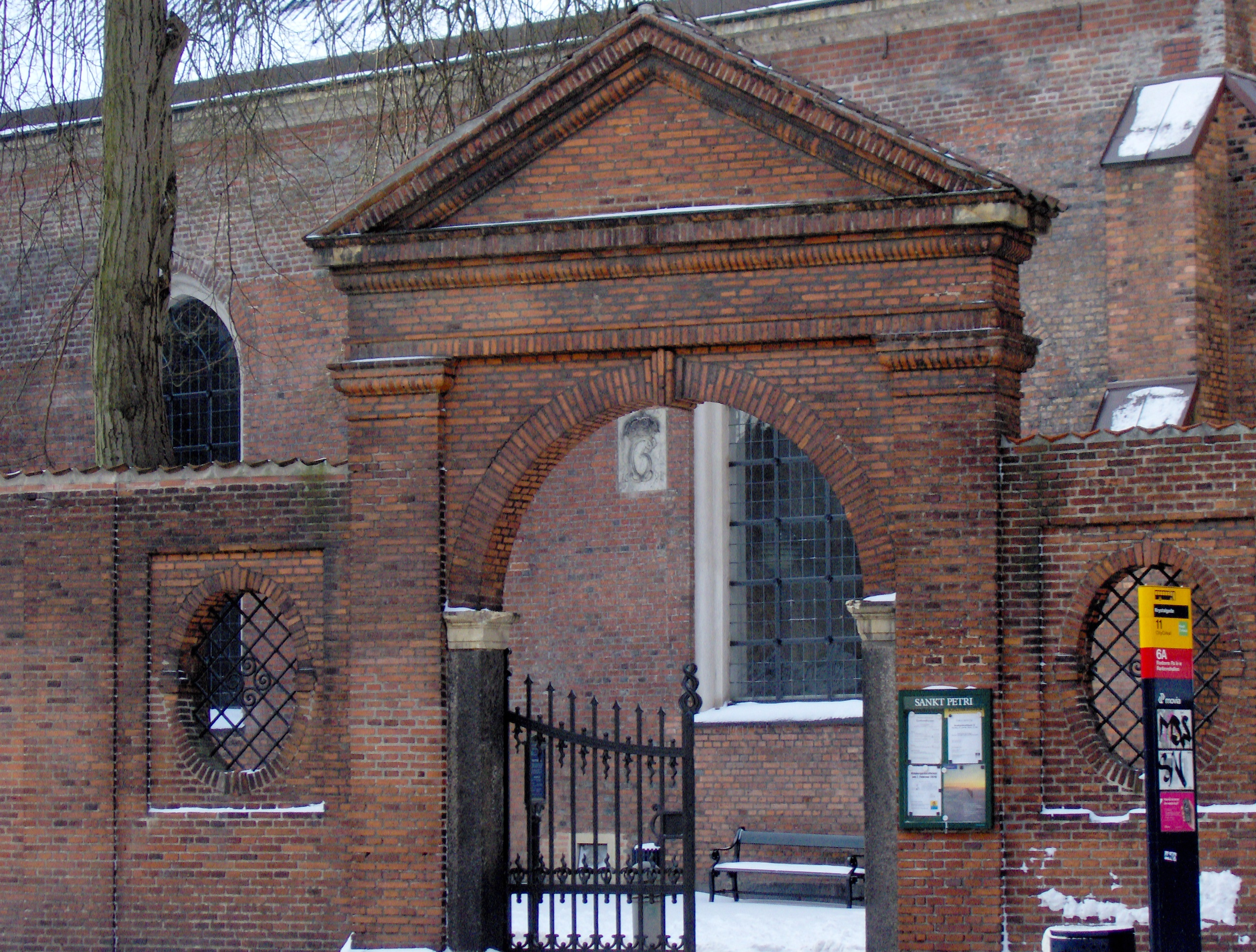
The main entrance to St Peter's Church

Povl Badstuber's House (No. 3) is one of few houses that survived the fire in 1795. It was built by the copper smith Povl Badstuber in 1732.

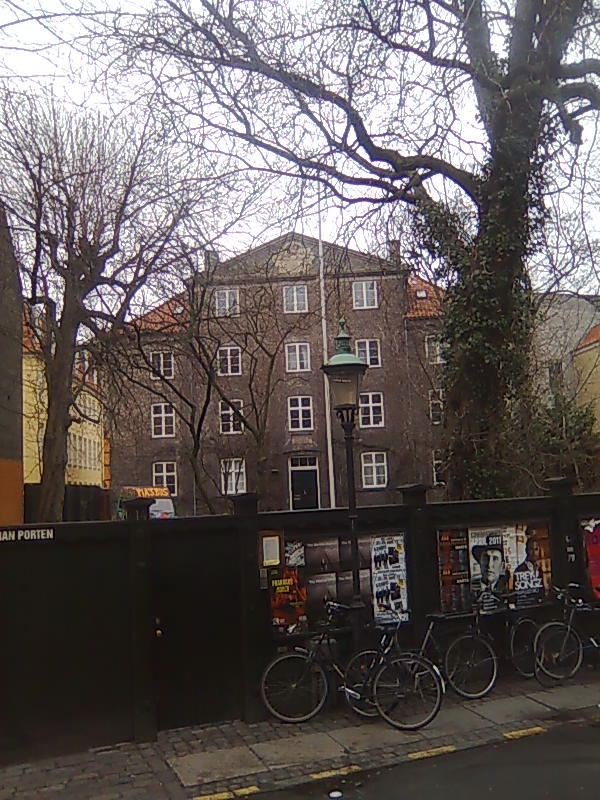
Valkendorfs Kollegium

Valkendorfs Kollegium is the oldest dormitory associated with the University of Copenhagen. It takes its name after Christopher Valkendorf who founded it on 26 February 1589 following his acquisition of the former Carmelite priory. The current building is from 1866 and was designed by Christian Hansen.

Other listed buildings in the street include No. 18, 27, 28, 29, 32 and 44.

No. 5, 13 and 15 are part of the Studiegården complex, which is used by University of Copenhagen. No. 13 is from 1753.

The building at No. 4, which overlooks St. Peter's garden, is a former girls' school. The building is from 1858 and was designed by Jens Juel Eckersberg, son of the painter Christoffer Wilhelm Eckersberg.

The boutique hotel SP34 is located at No. 34. Two-storey Fantask (No. 18) is Copenhagen's largest shop specializing in cartoons. Restaurant Bror was opened at No. 24A by two former Noma-chefs in 2013.

== Image gallery ==
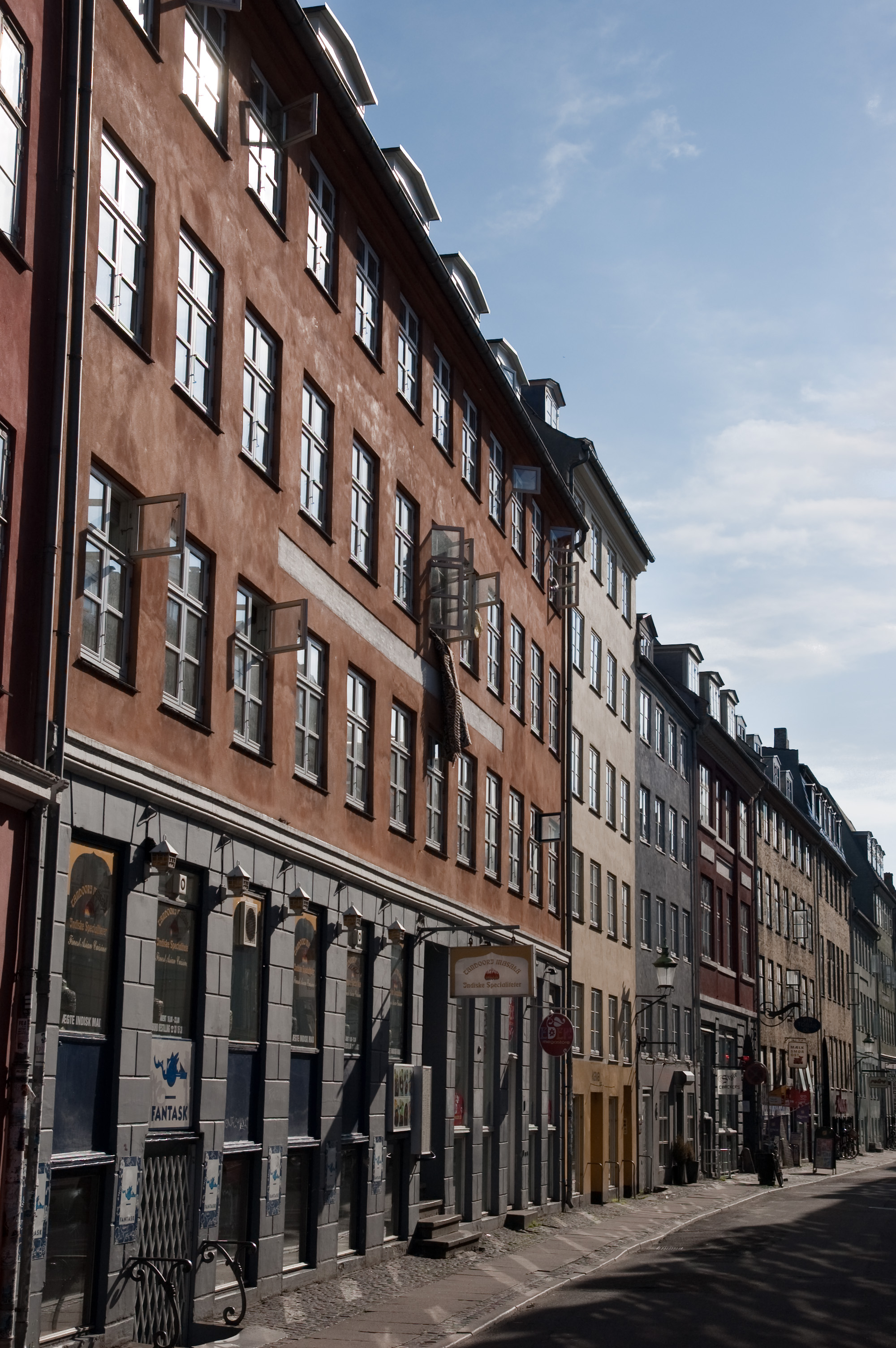

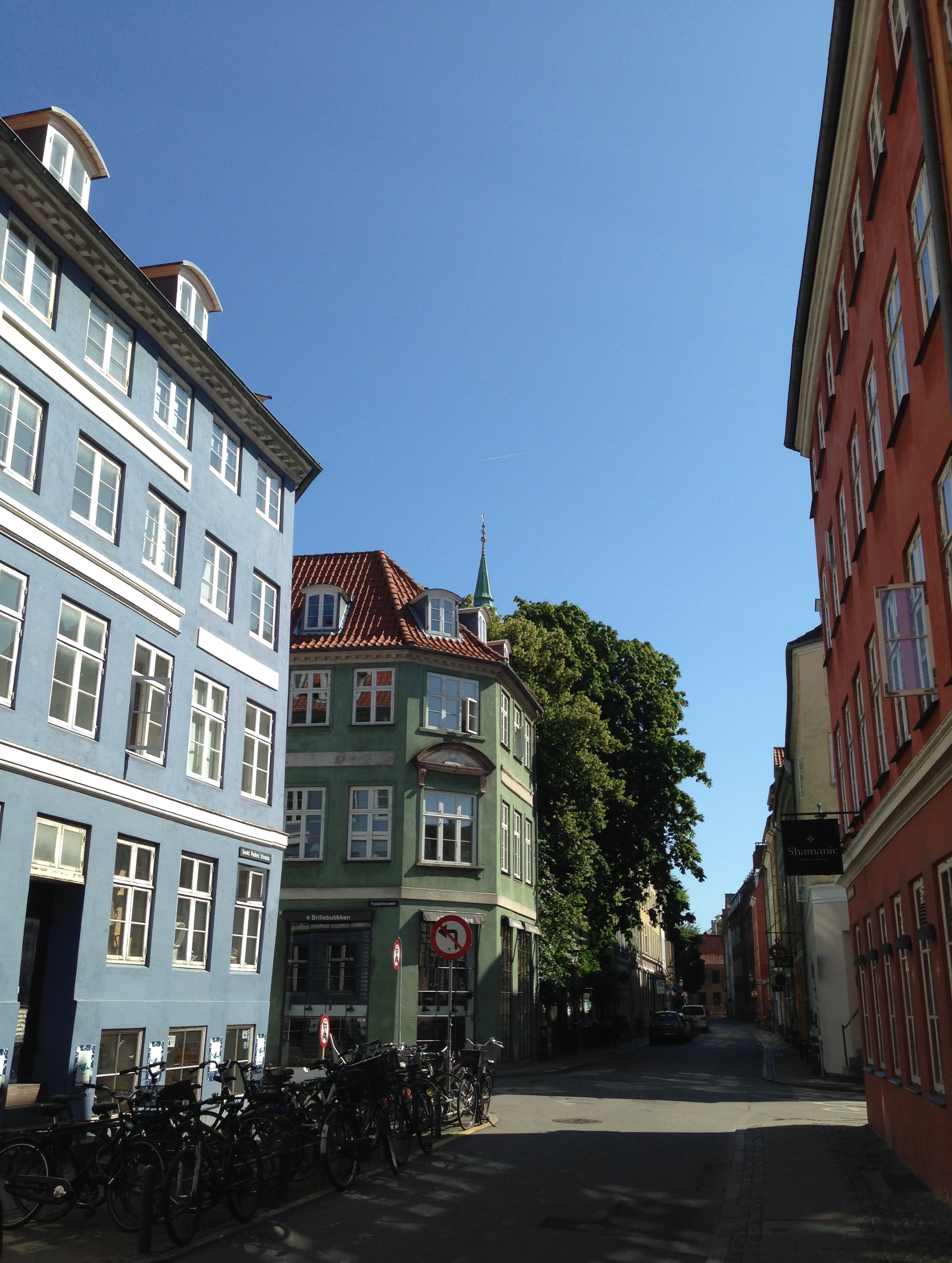
