= Carmelite Priory, Helsingør =

House of Carmelite friars in Denmark

Coordinates: 56°02′13″N 12°36′48″E

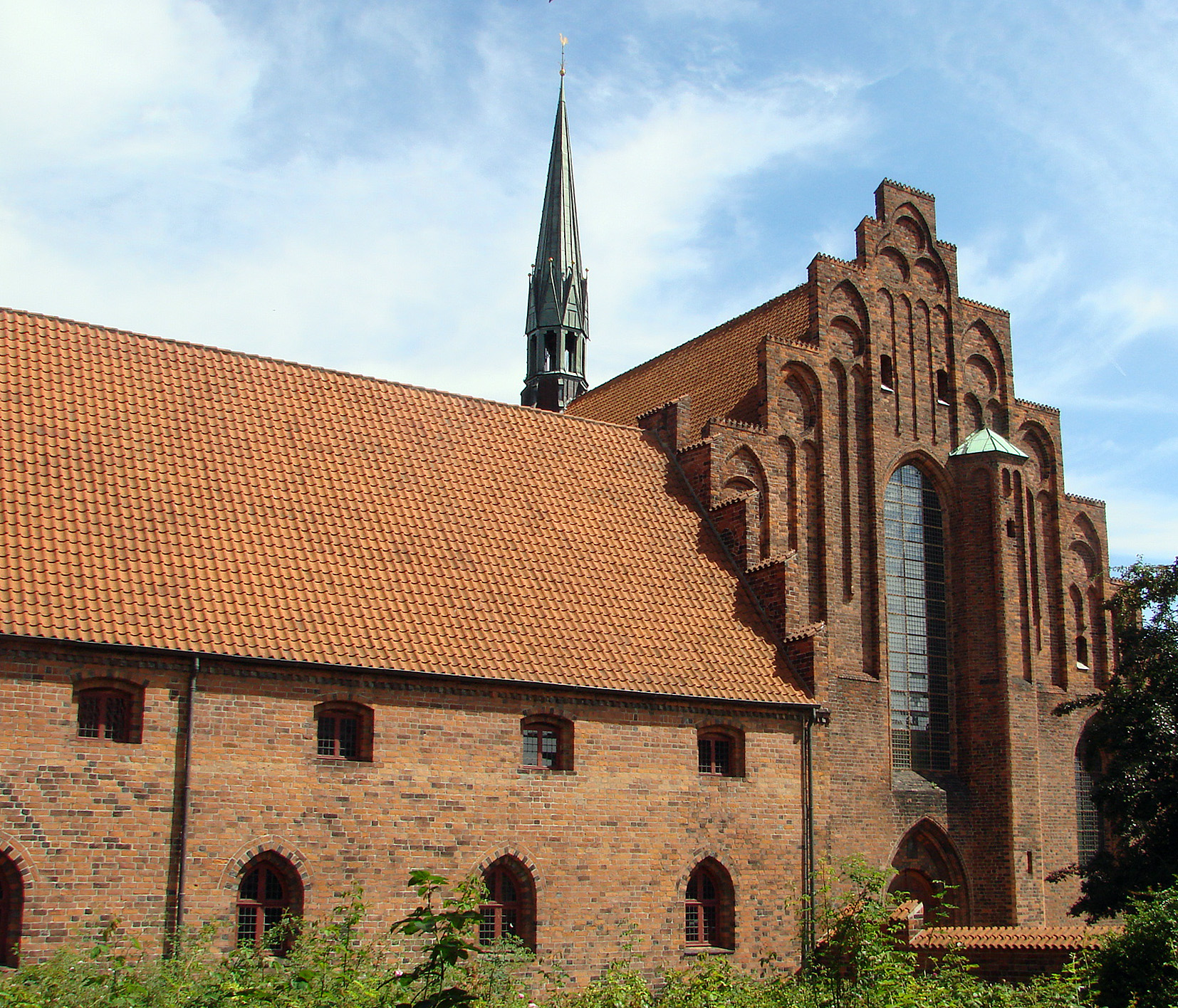
Former Carmelite Priory and St. Mary's Church, Helsingør

The Carmelite Priory, Helsingør, or Priory of Our Lady, Helsingør (Vor Frue Kloster), was a house of Carmelite friars in Helsingør, Zealand, Denmark, established in 1430. It is the finest example of a complete monastic complex surviving in Denmark, and one of the best in all of Scandinavia.

== History ==
=== Carmelites ===
The Priory of Our Lady was established in 1430 for a group of Carmelite friars from Landskrona. It was one of three religious houses founded in Helsingør by King Erik VII as it grew from a small fishing village to a trading port on Øresund, the strait which separates Zealand from Skåne (now in southern Sweden), an important fishing ground and busy shipping corridor between the North Sea and the Baltic. Erik VII, the heir of Margaret I, needed funds and his new toll on shipping was a source of steady income. He wanted to impress outsiders and set about purposefully to develop Helsingør as a gateway city. One of the things he did was to establish in the town not only the priory for the Carmelites but also a Franciscan friary and a Dominican priory.

The Carmelites were a mendicant order (tiggermunk) which means that at least in the beginning they depended on the generosity of local residents for their sustenance. They were sometimes called the "little white friars". King Erik invited them into Denmark and established the priory of Our Lady in Helsingør to ensure that they remained. As time passed the priory received many properties scattered all over Zealand which decreased their dependence on others. The priory in Helsingør eventually became the headquarters for the Carmelites in Scandinavia.

Its property was a gift from King Erik, and included several farms for its maintenance. The buildings were of red brick, the most common building material of the day in the region. The three main buildings were built around a central garden and cloister, with the church of St. Mary forming the fourth side to the south. The church was built as a three-aisled basilica, but the central nave was built significantly higher than the others in the Gothic style.

The oldest buildings were destroyed by a fire in 1450, resulting in its current appearance which dates to 1500, when the building of the church was completed. In 1516 a hospital was created here for foreign sailors.

The most influential Carmelite from the priory in Helsingør was Poul Helgesen, who was a university lecturer and student of Erasmus. He was an early proponent of Lutheran reforms in Denmark, but later became disenchanted with Lutheranism as well, earning him the hatred of both religious communities. He wrote a chronicle of his turbulent time, but it was never published. A manuscript was discovered inside the walls of Skibby church, later published under the title Skibby Chronicle.

=== Dissolution and after ===
After the dissolution of the priory in 1536 during the Reformation, the Carmelites were turned out, and the premises were abandoned until 1541 when Christian III re-endowed it as the hospital of Helsingør (Vor Frue Hospital or Almindeligt Hospital), with enough income-producing properties to sustain it. It was continued in intermittent use as a hospital for the sick, the elderly, and the poor until 1916, when new premises were made available elsewhere. Also in 1541 a grammar school was established in the west wing, which continued until 1807.

From 1930 a small number of single women lived in the buildings as an almshouse, the last of whom left in 1986. In 1989 the local church and episcopal authorities took over the buildings and still occupy part of them. In 1992 restoration work was carried out on the frescoes in the former conventual buildings.

Priory

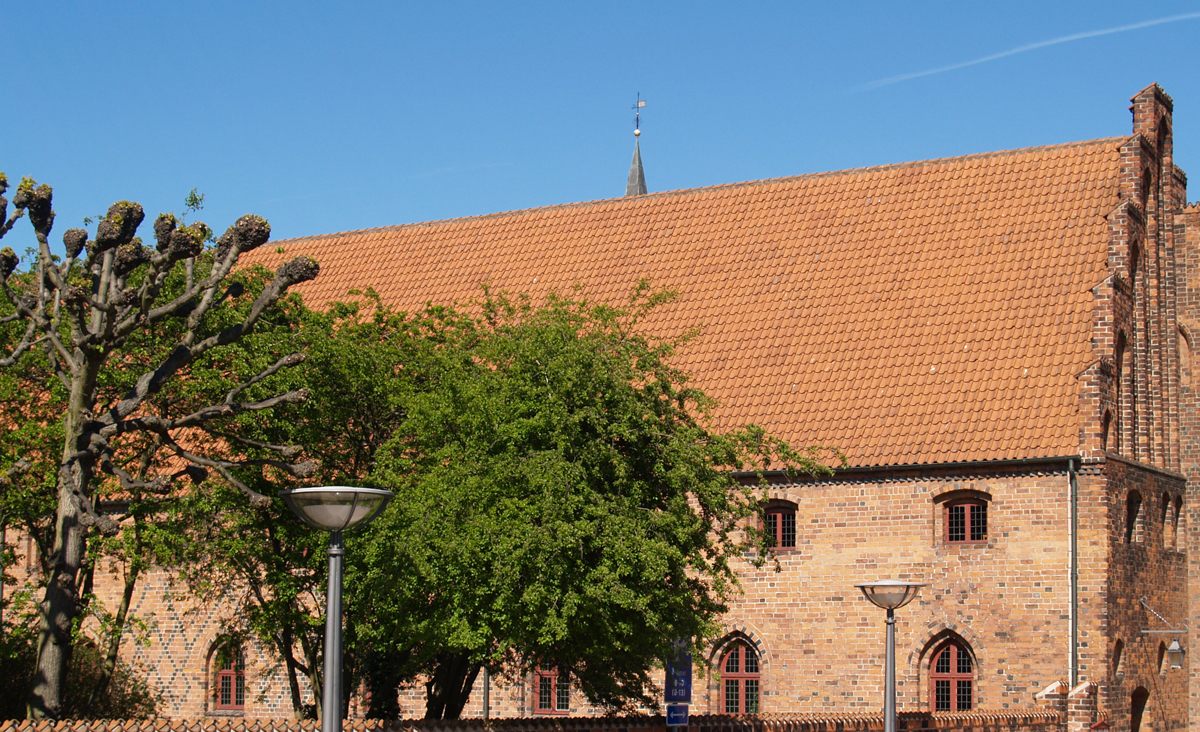
Conventual range

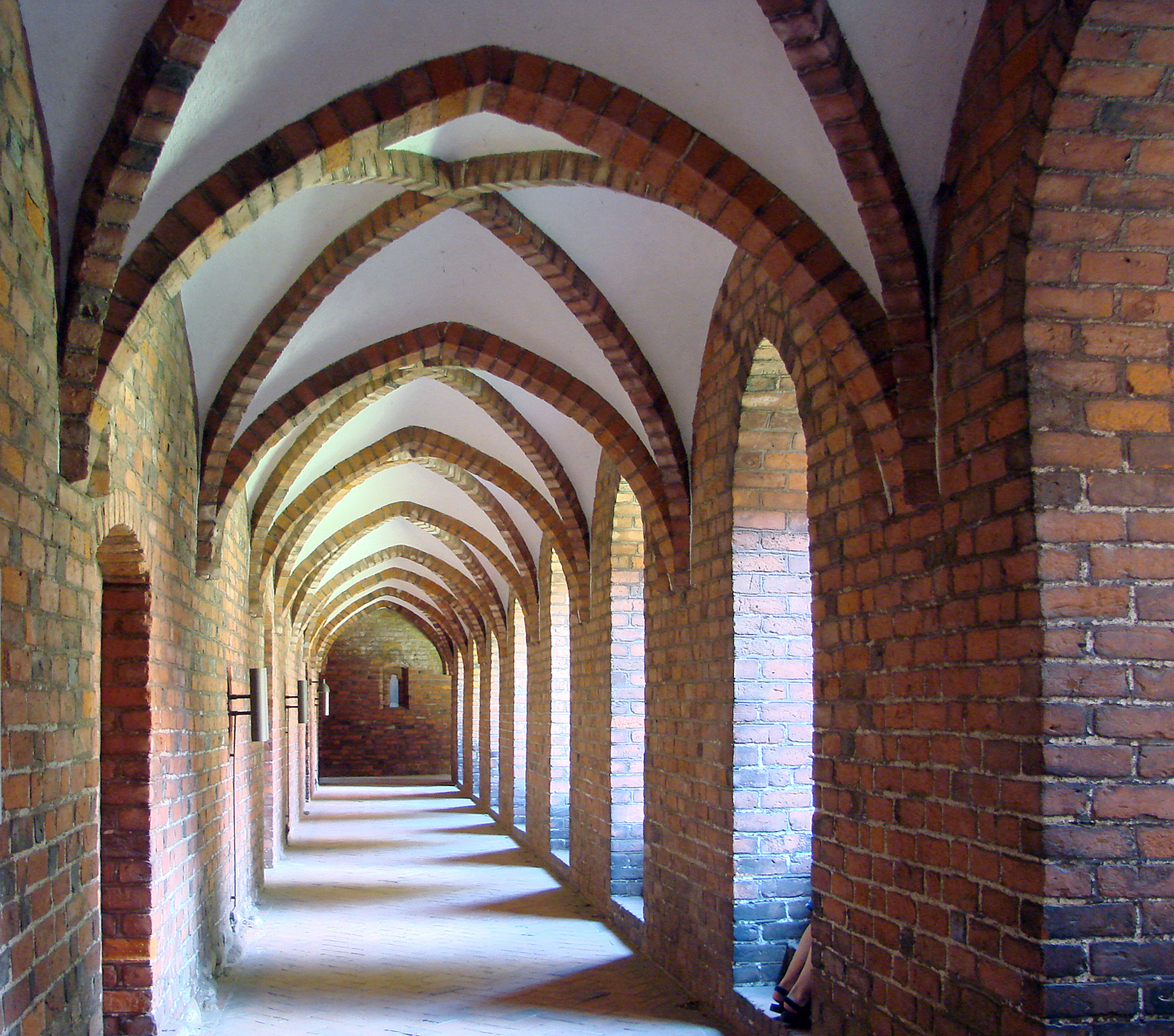
Cloister

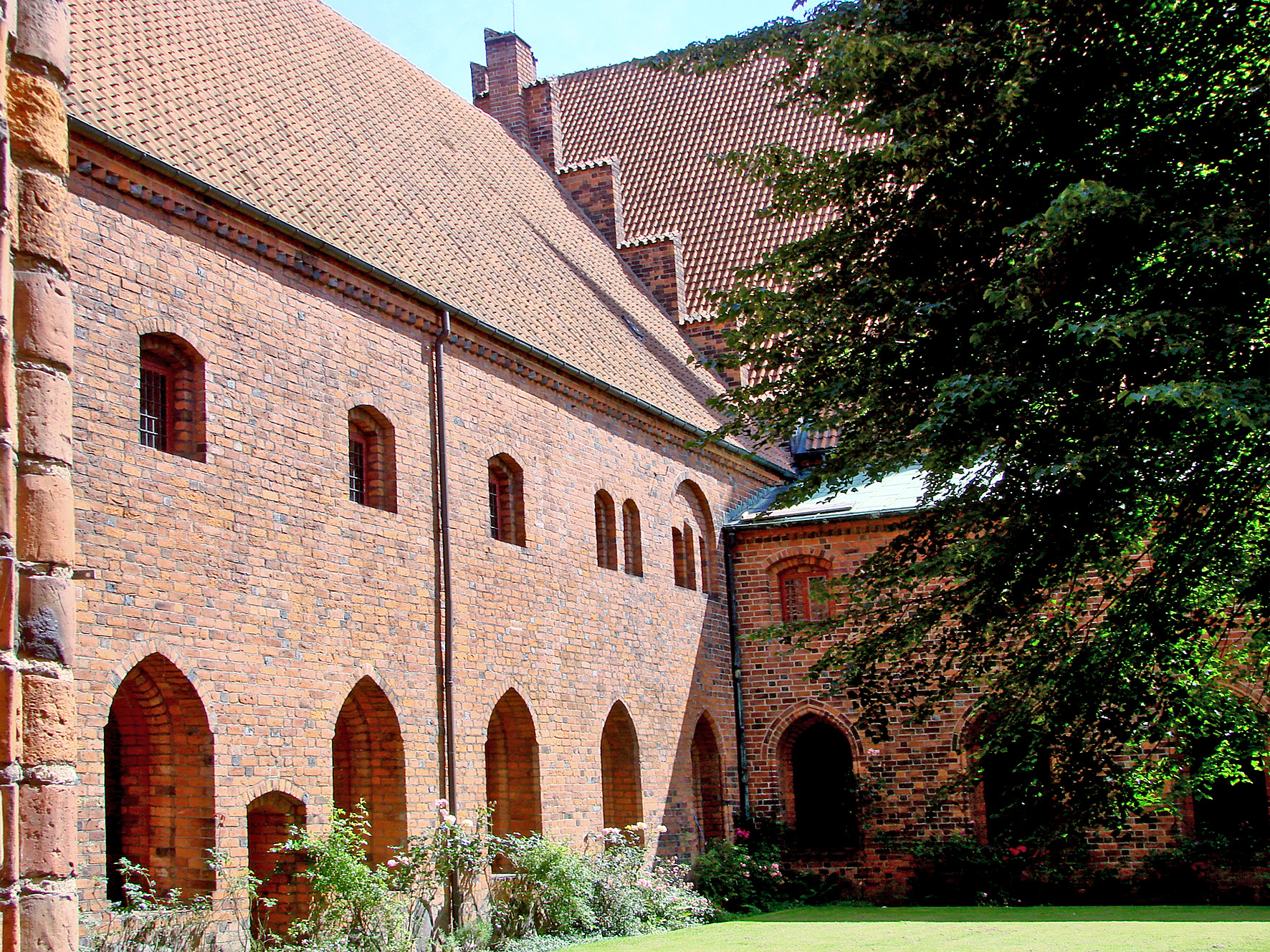
Cloister garth

=== St. Mary's Church ===
The first intention after the dissolution of the priory was to demolish the church, but it found use as a warehouse and as stabling for horses, which preserved it until 1577, when it was made available to the foreign community residing in Helsingør, mostly Germans from the cities of the Hanseatic League. It remained the "German" church until 1851, although from 1740 it was also the church for the garrison at Kronborg Castle. It became Helsingør's second parish church in 1819 when St. Olai's parish split into two, although sermons in German were delivered here, between Danish services, until 1851. A large number of German inscriptions remain to testify to the church's Hanseatic past.

Between 1900 and 1907 the church and the conventual buildings were entirely restored under Professor H. B. Storck, with particular attention to the restoration and conservation of the impressive frescoes on the walls and ceilings.

St. Mary's is home to a magnificent Baroque organ built between 1634 and 1636 by Johan Lorentz. One of the organists was the famed composer Dietrich Buxtehude. It was thoroughly renovated from 1997 on by Marcussen & Søn.

Church

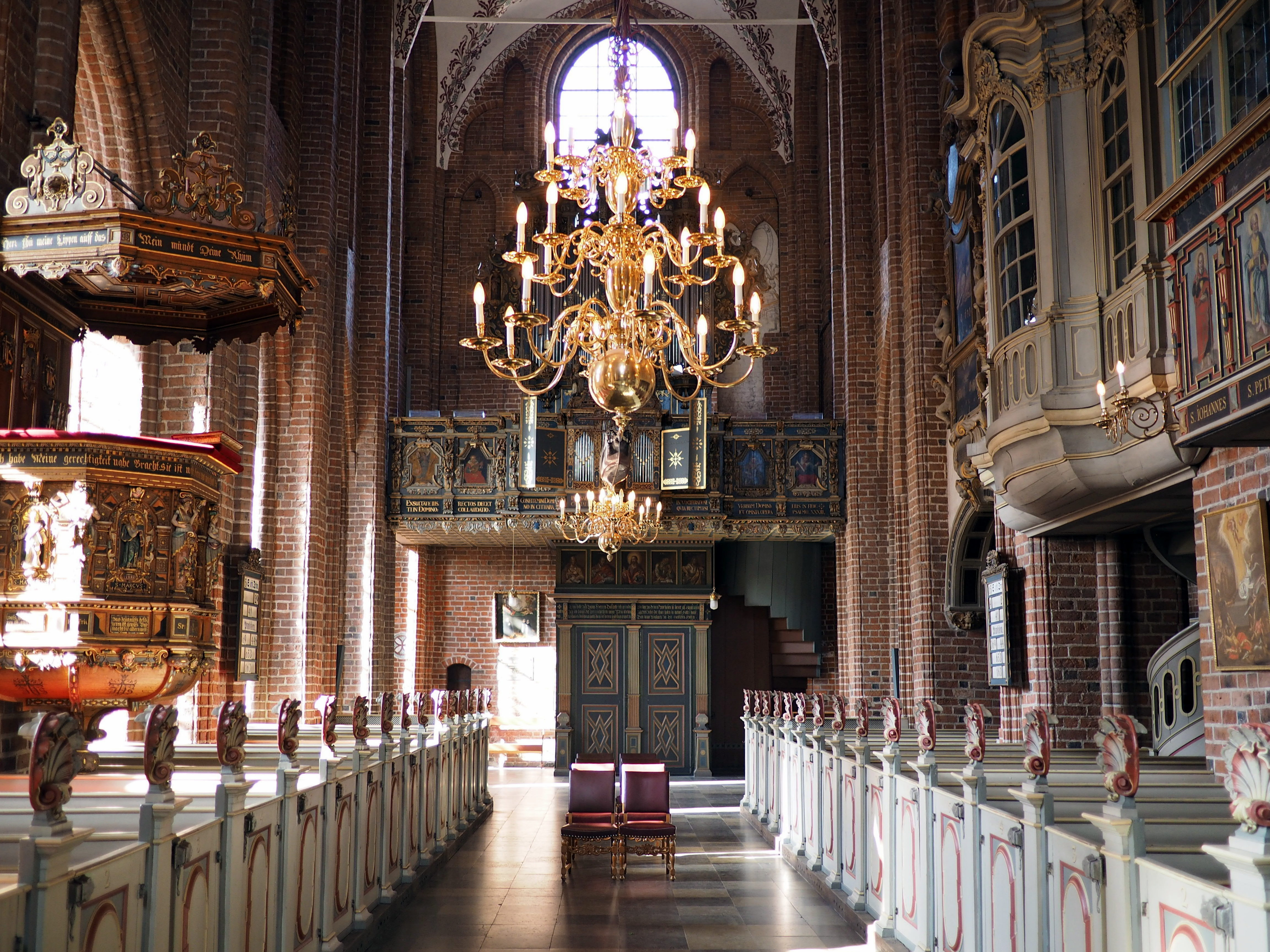
Interior

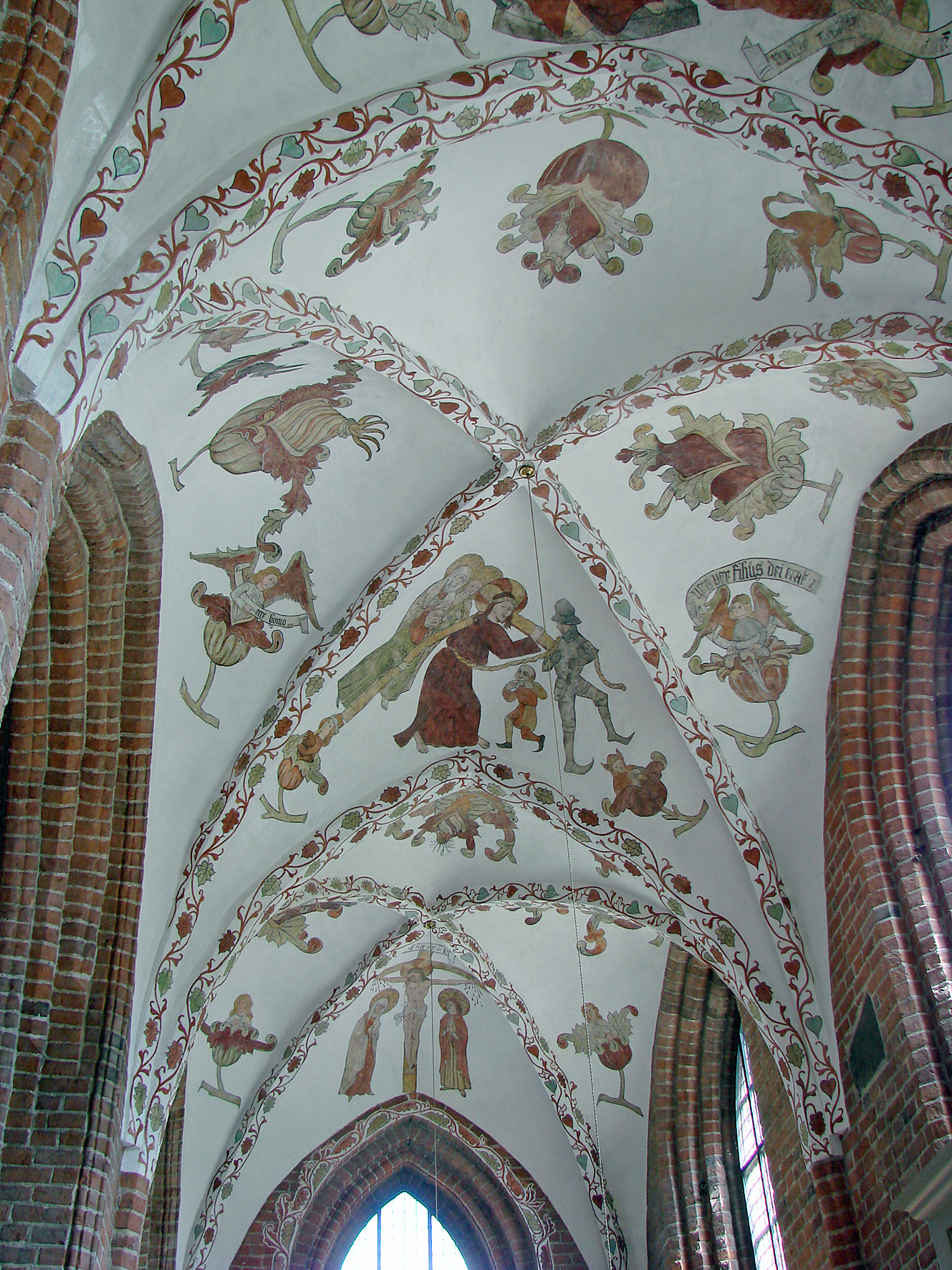
Frescoes

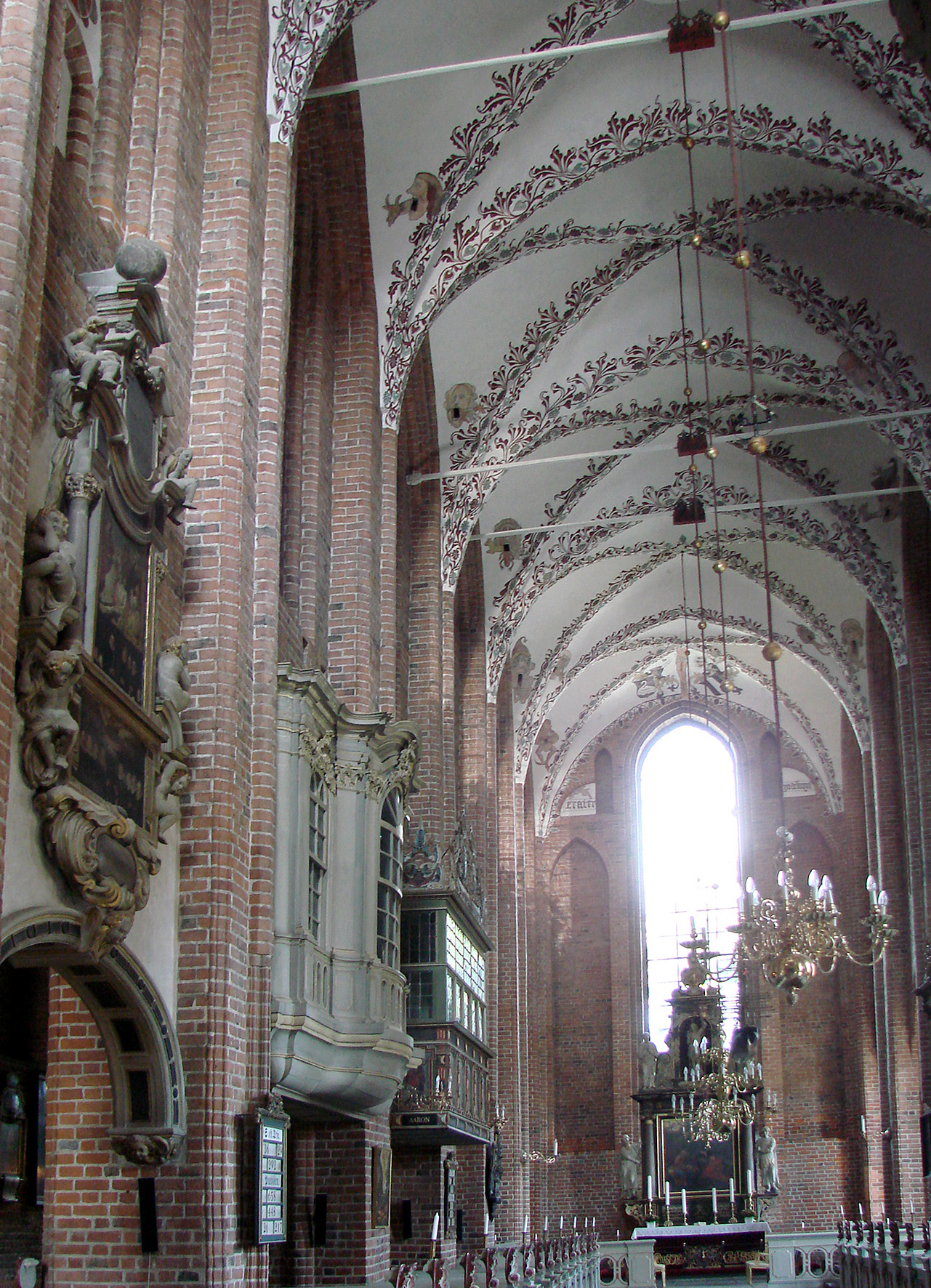
Nave

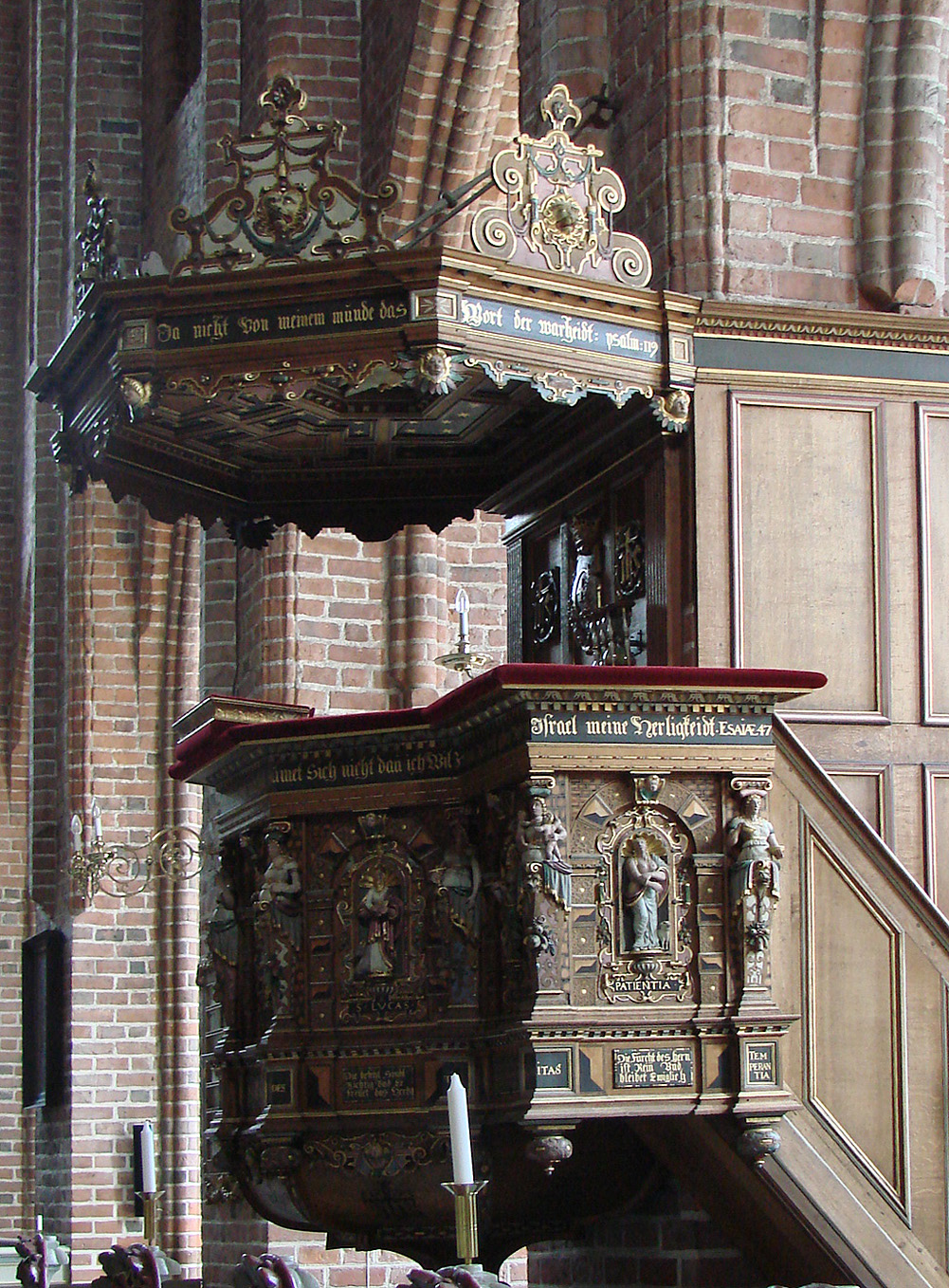
Pulpit

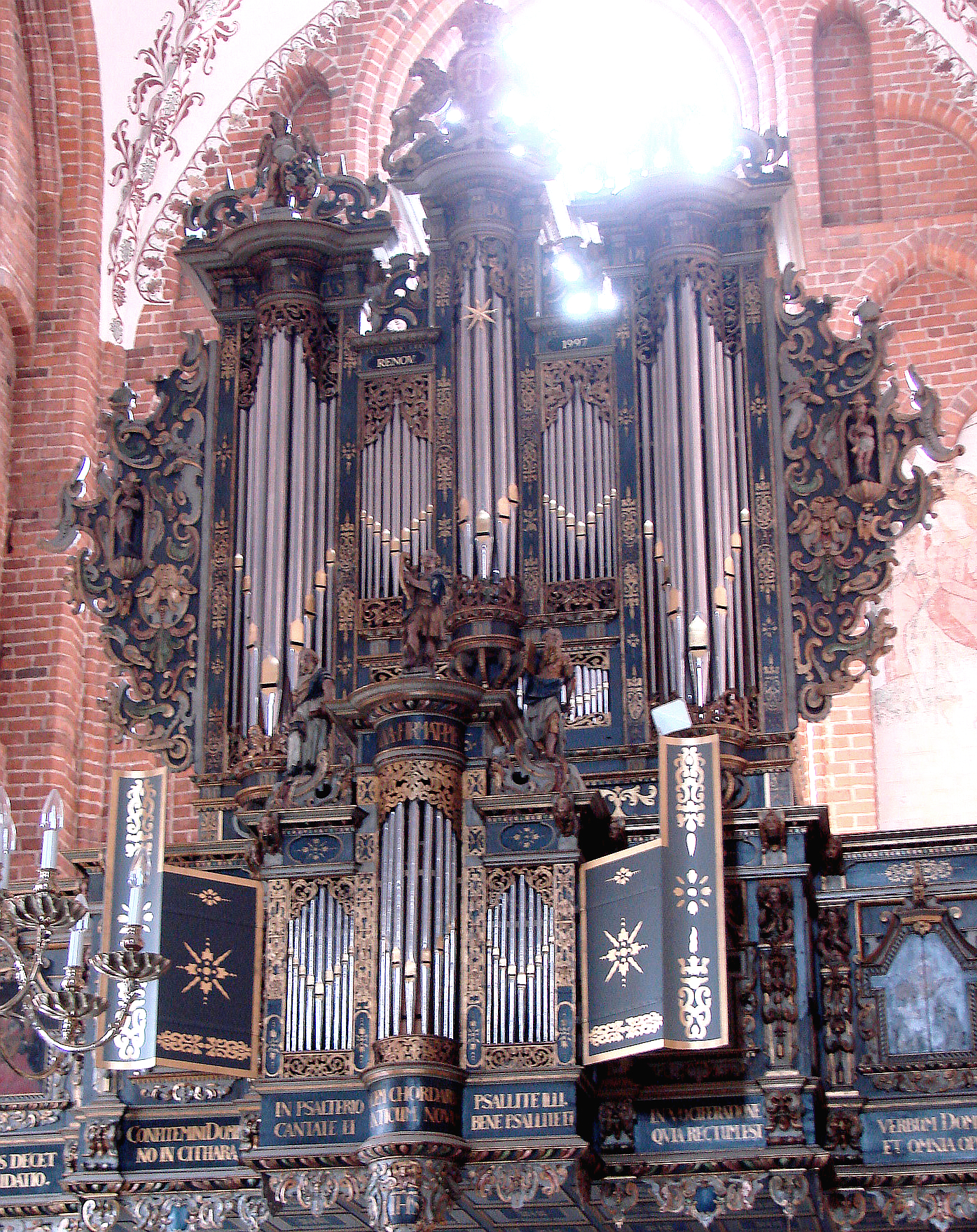
Organ

== Sources ==
- Helsingørdomkirke.dk: Sanct Olai Kirke and Sanct Mariæ Kloster (in Danish)
- Helsingorleksikon.dk: Sct. Mariae Kirke (in Danish)
