= Poul Helgesen =

Danish Carmelite, humanist and historian

- Born: c. 1485; Varberg, Halland
- Died: after 1534
- Education: University of Copenhagen
- Notable work: Skibby Chronicle

Poul Helgesen (also Paul Eliasen; Latin: Paulus Heliæ; ca. 1485 – died after 1534) was a Danish Carmelite, a humanist and historian. Helgesen was a mendicant monk who at first supported Christian II and the Lutheran reform movement, but later broke with both and wrote warnings against the tyrannical king and the Lutheran preachers. Like his role model Erasmus of Rotterdam, Helgesen found himself in the gray area between Catholicism and Protestantism.

== Life ==
Helgesen, the leading Danish example of Reform Catholicism (a minor Danish parallel of Erasmus of Rotterdam) came from Varberg in the province of Halland, now part of Sweden. He himself writes that his mother was of Swedish descent; otherwise nothing else is known about his family. Early on – apparently in his childhood – he joined the Carmelite Order in Varberg. The Carmelites placed great emphasis on Bible study and preaching, and Helgesen was one of the learned monks. At some point he received his baccalaureus degree in theology. In 1517 he was in Helsingør, where he began humanistic studies and became particularly interested in the writings of Erasmus of Rotterdam. He mentions that Master Svend of Skara was his schoolmaster. Master Svend is said to have been a follower of Erasmus; he later became a Lutheran bishop and may have been the one who influenced the boy to criticize the abuses of the Catholic Church at an early age.

Helgesen's preoccupation with Erasmus is quite striking, given how harshly the Carmelites condemned Erasmus. The order's teaching at the universities of Paris, Cologne and Louvain was distinctly anti-humanist and conservative, and the Carmelite monks emerged as some of Erasmus' fiercest opponents. At the council in Cologne in 1526, all of Erasmus' books were banned, and the local priors threatened to be deposed if they did not remove the books from their monastic libraries. Nevertheless, the Carmelites cannot have ever questioned Helgesen's orthodoxy, for in 1522 he was elected provincial prior, i.e. supreme head of the order's province of Dacia et Norwegia (Denmark and Norway), an office he held for the rest of his life.

Helgesen won early respect for his knowledge. Not only was he conversant with the classics of antiquity and the Church Fathers, but he was also familiar with medieval and Renaissance authors. Helgesen referred to Petrarch and Marsilio Ficino (1433–1499), and translated a work by Angelo Poliziano. He discussed a paper on public poor relief written by the Spanish humanist Juan Luis Vives (1492–1540) and followed the writings of Luther and his followers. With his extensive knowledge of the past and present, Helgesen stands out as one of the foremost spiritual figures of his time in the Nordic countries.

Helgesen may have spent some time studying in Italy around 1500, because the script he uses in the Skibby Chronicle is called humanist cursive, an Italian script invented in the 15th century. It first came to Denmark during the Reformation, so Helgesen was among the first to use it in the Nordic countries. The pen is used differently than when writing Gothic script, so Helgesen must have learned this style. Danish Carmelite monks are known to have participated in church councils in Rome in 1498 and 1513 and in Piacenza in 1503, but nothing concrete has been found about Helgesen's participation.

If Helgesen condemned Christian II as a bloodthirsty tyrant, he did not condemn him for the Stockholm Bloodbath of November 1520. Helgesen was appalled by the massacre, but it seems that he placed the main blame on the king's advisors, archbishops Gustav Trolle and Didrik Slagheck, Sigbrit Willoms who accompanied Christian II and his family in exile, and Bishop Jens Andersen Beldenak whom the king kept imprisoned for several years. The German Didrik Slagheck came to Bergen as an indulgence trader, entered Christian II's service and participated in the Stockholm Bloodbath. The king rewarded him with the Diocese of Skara and in 1521 with the Archbishopric of Lund, but Slagheck fell from grace and was burned on 24 January 1522 at Gammeltorv in Copenhagen. Helgesen was present at the time. "Such is the fate of all who corrupt the minds of princes with false counsel," he commented the same day in a writing dedicated to Christian II.

== Lecturer in Copenhagen ==
In 1519, Helgesen became head of the Carmelite college that Christian II had established in Copenhagen. As a lecturer, Helgesen was to teach the Bible at the University of Copenhagen. In 1526, the king asked him to give a lecture at the palace on "Lutheranism", which he thought he did "moderately"; but was nevertheless mobbed by anti-Catholic courtiers and chased down the street afterwards by a court jester, while the soldiers called him a "hypocrite" and "murderer of souls". Helgesen was influenced by Luther's ideas and himself came to influence his students with Reformation ideas, many of whom later became pioneers of the Danish Reformation. By about 1530 his former students had in many cases become evangelical preachers in Malmø and Copenhagen, "tendentiously refusing to distinguish between the Catholic Church itself and reformed Catholic criticism of its practices", and bestowed their old teacher with the epithet "Poul Vendekåbe" ('Poul Turncoat').

The Carmelites valued study, and Helgesen took Erasmus and the humanist slogan "back to the sources" as his model. He placed the New Testament, the Church Fathers and the life of the early Church at the center of his desire to reform the Catholic Church without breaking with it. Like the Protestants, he believed that salvation is by faith, but he also emphasized personal piety and morality. Unlike Luther, he did not conceive of salvation as a free gift from God, but as something that came with conditions. He was a sharp critic of the decay of the Danish church, but reforms were to be made without the intervention of the laity. The replacement of liturgy with the singing of hymns in Danish greatly upset Helgesen. In Catholic times, lay people were allowed to sing Danish hymns in procession, but he believed that such inclusions in the service were an unheard-of impertinence on the part of the congregation, and that women's singing caused "the minds of many to be moved more to sinful thoughts than to godliness."

Helgesen's ideal seems to have been a humanist royal power that preserved intellectual and cultural values. Quite early on he was in opposition to King Christian II, and in the Skibby Chronicle he lists the king's abuses and crimes. Nevertheless, it was Christian II's positive attitude that brought humanism to Denmark, as can be seen from his planned reform laws with greater requirements for education and teaching, and his financial support for the Carmelite Order's house on Sankt Peders Stræde in Copenhagen. King Christian also invited humanist teachers from Wittenberg to Copenhagen, including Mathias Gabler, who began teaching Greek at the University of Copenhagen in the spring of 1521.

After the fall of the king in 1523, Helgesen was on the side of the rebellious nobles, and was likely the author of the letter of complaint against the deposed king. In the Skibby Chronicle, Helgesen follows the ancient and humanist tradition of viewing history as an instructive mirror, magistra vitæ ('schoolmistress of life'), where one can learn from the follies of others and hopefully avoid making the same mistakes. His chronicle lacks depictions of individuals, landscapes, battle scenes and state documents – except for the complaint against King Christian, which he had nevertheless written himself.

The people had grown tired of the monasteries. In four years from 1528 to 1531, 21 of Denmark's 28 Franciscan monasteries disappeared: in Copenhagen, Franciscan monks were locked up until they surrendered themselves and their monastery. King Christian gave the common people permission to use the Franciscan monastery in Copenhagen as a hospital and the Monastery of the Holy Spirit as a town hall; in 1529 he confiscated most of the church property, using it to pay a preacher and establish a hospital and an evangelical seminary. The instructors included, to Helgesen's indignation, the apostate Carmelite monks Peder Laurensen (1485–1552) and Frans Vormordsen (1491–1551), whom Helgesen himself had taught.

At the same time, Helgesen remained critical of the Catholic Church's abuses, such as the trade in indulgences. As a participant in the religious debate of the 1520s, he could not avoid being seen as a spokesman for the established church. He became involved in heated and sometimes highly inflammatory polemics against those who supported the reform movement without receiving support himself, which led to his eventual isolation.

Helgesen himself became more critical of Lutheran doctrine and practice over time, and expressed it vocally, as when after the death of King Frederick in 1533 he had the reformer Hans Tausen found guilty of heresy at the meeting between the king and council in Copenhagen in 1533. But the general attitude towards the Catholic bishops and the outbreak of the Count's Feud made his efforts futile. After the death of Frederick I in April 1533, the Rigsråd (Privy Council) took over the rule of Denmark and postponed the election of a new king. The bishops saw their chance to persuade the Catholic members of the Rigsråd to reinstate the bishops' power, that only they could appoint preachers, that the churches retained their estates and had their confiscated properties returned. Erik Eriksen Banner and Mogens Gøye, who were Lutherans, did not want to seal the document, but the bishops were so enthusiastic about their victory that they banished Tausen, who had become a priest in the Church of St. Nikolaj, from Zealand and Scania, while preachers in Scania were declared outlaws and heretics. At this point a rebellion broke out that developed into a civil war, the Count's Feud. Helgesen called it the "common man's rebellion and disobedience", but it was a matter of class conflict, with the Lutheran cities of Malmö and Copenhagen, supported by Lübeck, rising up against the Privy Council. The aim of the rebellion was to reinstate Christian II – but he had in the meantime become a Catholic again.

The new king, Frederick I, would pursue a church policy that deeply disappointed Helgesen. In the course of the Count's Feud, Helgesen disappeared from history. Whether he was murdered or died of natural causes and left the country remains a mystery. It is assumed that he died around 1534, but this is mere conjecture.

== Works ==
Helgesen was a prolific author, publishing several books in Danish, including Martin Luther's Betbüchlein ('Little Prayer Book'). Many of his works have been lost, but his translation of Erasmus' Institutio Principis Christiani (1522) is also an indication of his own ideals. An independent work is his Historia Compendiose (c. 1523), a short account of the Danish kings and their relations. His polemical writings against both Catholics and Protestants show his theological knowledge and have been interpreted as evidence of a fiery temper. Helgesen in fact expressed himself in the tradition of Cicero, Quintilian and Erasmus, where the seriousness of the matter is emphasized precisely by the use of sharp turns of phrase and outbursts. Thus Helgesen had called the prominent nobleman Erik Eriksen Banner a "copycat" and "ape". Banner (1484–1554) had attempted to have Duke Christian succeed to the Danish throne, which the duke refused until the Rigsrådet had asked him; Banner was also one of the most ardent champions of the Reformation in Denmark, and was instrumental in bringing Tausen back to Copenhagen.

Helgesen was an outstanding historian, and his main work, handwritten in Latin, is the unfinished Skibby Chronicle (Danish: Skibbykrøniken), with biting criticism of the Denmark of his time. Corrections and additions were made to the manuscript, including by the Franciscan Peder Olsen ("Petrus Olai", c. 1490–c. 1570) before it was hidden in the walls of a church. The manuscript was rediscovered in 1650, walled up in Skibby Kirke in Hornsherred. The work is anonymous, but all modern historians since Jakob Langebek in 1773 recognize Helgesen as the author.

Although weakly constructed and mixing large and small events, the work is nevertheless a monument to his firm political and religious convictions with its description of the Stockholm Bloodbath, Christian II's escape from Denmark which Helgesen himself contributed to, Frederik I's inauguration and his connection with Tausen; the Lutheran storming of the Church of Our Lady in Copenhagen in 1530, and King Christian's imprisonment in Sønderborg Castle. Helgesen makes no secret of either his antipathies or his sympathies. The Skibby Chronicle stops in the middle of a sentence in the year 1534. It is not known how it found its way from Skibby to the Arnamagnæan Manuscript Collection in Copenhagen.

== See also ==
- Reformation in Denmark–Norway and Holstein
