= Pakhusgaarden =

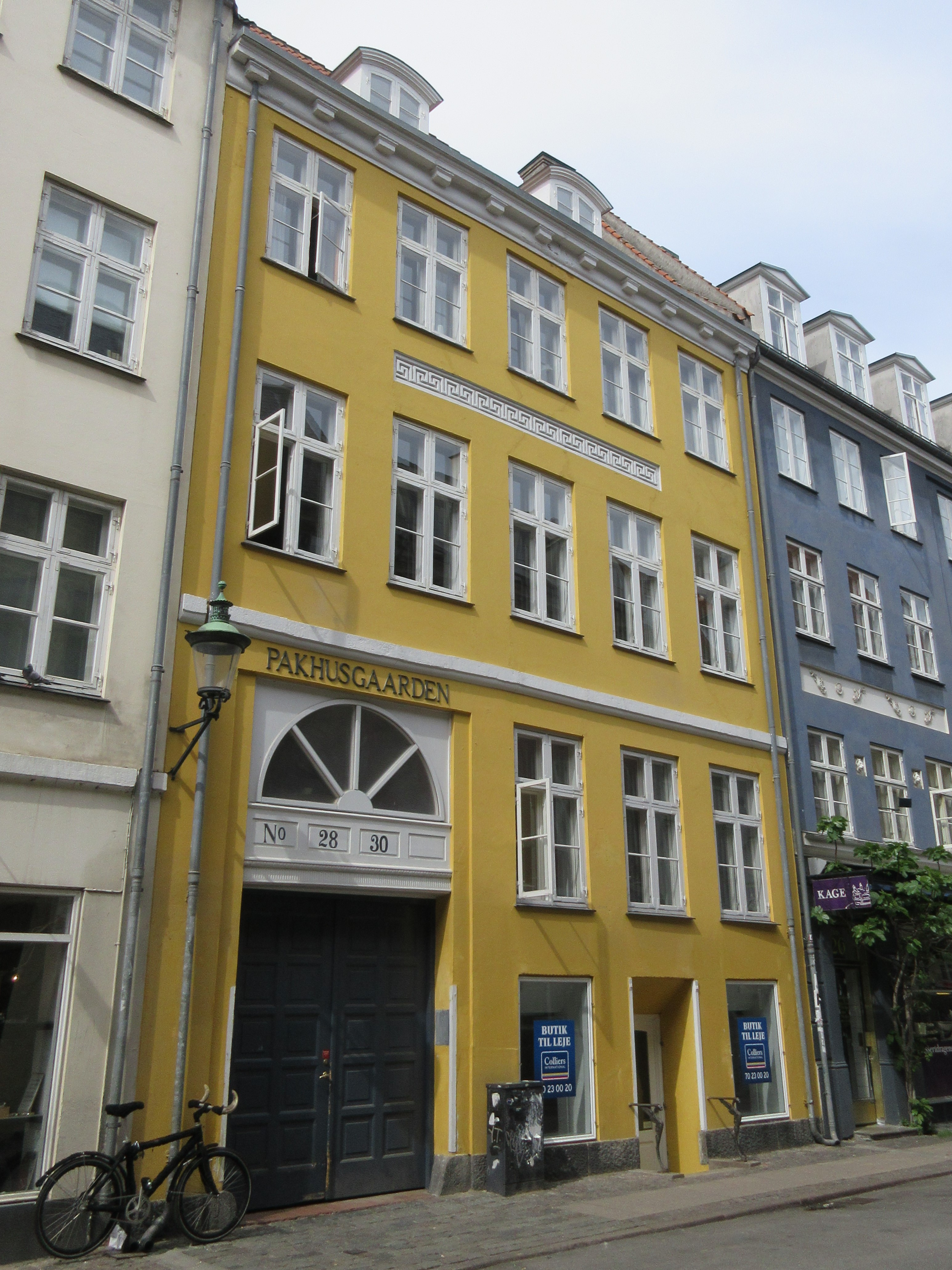

General information
- Architectural style: Neoclassical
- Location: Copenhagen, Denmark
- Coordinates: 55°40′44.08″N 12°34′3.79″E
- Construction started: 1797
- Completed: 1798

Pakhusgaarden is a Neoclassical property located at Sankt Peders Stræde 28 in the Latin Quarter of central Copenhagen, Denmark. The building was listed on the Danish registry of protected buildings and places in 1959.

== History ==
Pakhusgaarden was built in 1797-98 for destiller Christen Johansen after the previous building at the site had been destroyed in the Copenhagen Fire of 1795.

The building survived the British bombardment of Copenhagen in 1807. Christian Johansen sold it to a pension fund, "Det stigende og arvelige Livrente Selskab for begge Køn". It then changed hands several times over the next few years. In 1808, it was acquired by shoemaker Christian Ferdinand Danielsen for 24,650 Danish rigsdaler. In 1810, he sold it to master mason Daniel Böhlig and Ignatius Erlewein. In 1811, they sold it to silk merchants Anders Kierkegaard and Niels Aabye.

In 1813, it was acquired by master carpenter and mill builder Johan Henrik Breede ejendommen for 18,000 rigsdaler. In 1825, he opened an oil mill in the building complex. Unlike traditional stamp mills, it relied on leverage, eliminating noise and sparing the building of harmful shaking. He was granted a 10-year monopoly on employment of the technology.

The building with its oil mill was in 1835 sold to merchant Jørgen Peter Bech for 30,000 rigsdaler. Thomas H. Erslev (1852–1930), a literary historian, was a resident in the building from 1838 to 1840. Poet and professor at the University of Copenhagen Christian Winther was a resident in the building in 1845.

In 1852, Bech's heirs sold it to Anton Michael Nyholm. He closed the oil mill. Later that same year Nyholm sold the property to destiller Carl Frederik Lassen for 26,105 rigsdaler. In 1857, Lassen transferred the garden to the neighbouring property which he also owned. The remains of Sankt Peders Stræde 28 was in 1877 sold to the businessman Rasmus Frederik Schrader for DKK 62,000. In 1898, Schrader's widow sold it for DKK 55,000 to merchant J.F. Rasmussen.

In 1907, Pakhusgaarden was acquired by A/S Importøren. The company was then headquartered in the building for almost 70 years.
