= St. George's Leper Hospital =

Former hospital in Denmark

The medieval St. George's Leper Hospital (Danish: Skt. Jørgen) lay just outside the city of Copenhagen, Denmark.

== History ==
The most feared disease of the Middle Ages was leprosy. The terrible effects of the disease on the body were so catastrophic that those with the disease were most often expelled from human society. As a result, St. George's Hospital was located outside the city. The earliest such foundations was in 1109 which were often dedicated to Saint George (Danish: Sankt Jørgen), the patron saint of knights and protector of the weak and helpless. The first mention of Copenhagen's leper hospital was in 1261 as an existing institution. In 1275, one Olof Blok willed the contents of a house in Copenhagen for the maintenance of the leper hospital.

In 1443, however, Christopher III commanded that known lepers should be taken out of their homes and moved, by force if necessary, to leper hospitals. He also sentenced bakers who sold adulterated bread to provide bread to St. George's Hospital and the Hospital of the Holy Ghost. To segregate lepers still further from the general population, the hospital was provided with enough property to be self-sufficient. Lepers were forbidden to work the fields, so tenant farmers lived on the farm to do the work. The hospital consisted of living quarters, a chapel, farm buildings and a brewery for the use of the inmates. The hospital had permission to solicit donations for the operation of the hospital. The lepers were permitted to stand to the side of the road and shake wooden clappers to warn travelers who often tossed coins toward the lepers as a kind of offering. The hospital periodically received larger donations including rental properties.

In 1348, the Hanseatic League devastated Copenhagen, including the leper hospital. It was rebuilt before 1380. The hospital was run by a fraternity, probably under the name of Saint Olaf, their particular patron. It was run like a monastery with both brothers and sisters. It had a superintendent to oversee day-to-day affairs. Franciscan friars came to pray in the chapel for the souls of the departed and say mass between 7:00 and 8:00 every morning. The chapel had an altar to Saint George and another dedicated to Saint Mary at "the monastery church of St. George" donated by Mayor Jep Klausen in 1476.

During the reign of Hans I of Denmark, the hospital became crown property and in 1502 it was given to Peder Andersen, a chancellor of the University of Copenhagen. He received the income from the hospital, and the inmates were forced to beg for their very existence. The situation was remedied in 1508 when he ordered the income from the hospital restored for the use of the "unhappy folk and sick". He also ordered two offering chests to be set up in the chapel which only the superintendent in the presence of one of the lepers could open. The funds were to be used for the benefit of the lepers.

St. George's survived the Reformation, though the property reverted to the crown at some point, and was later administered by a superintendent appointed by the Copenhagen City Council. It came under the administration of the Hospital of the Holy Ghost in 1581. St. George's Leper Hospital is illustrated and named in the first graphic depiction of the city in 1587.

In 1609, the Hospital of the Holy Ghost moved to its new location at Vartov and St. George's Hospital, with its buildings, fields, and appurtenances, was sold to Morten Wesling for 80 rigsdalers. In 1621, the old hospital complex was sold to the corporation of Copenhagen City and was entirely demolished. The remaining inmates were moved at the city's expense to the city's pestilence hospital (Danish: Pesthus) at Sortedam Lake.

== Sources ==
- Nielsen, Oluf Nielsen, nd: Kjøbenhavns Middelalderen (in Danish)
