= Election of Christian III =

1534 election of Christian III as King of Denmark

1534 Danish royal election
- 4 July 1534

Elected by the Riksråd and Nobility (Note: The election was conducted by the Jutlandic members of the Riksråd and the local nobility. The exact number of attendees is not recorded.) Consensus needed to win (Note: All electors present were required to reach a unanimous agreement for the election to be valid. Opposition from the Catholic bishops was suppressed by the lesser nobility to ensure this requirement was met.)
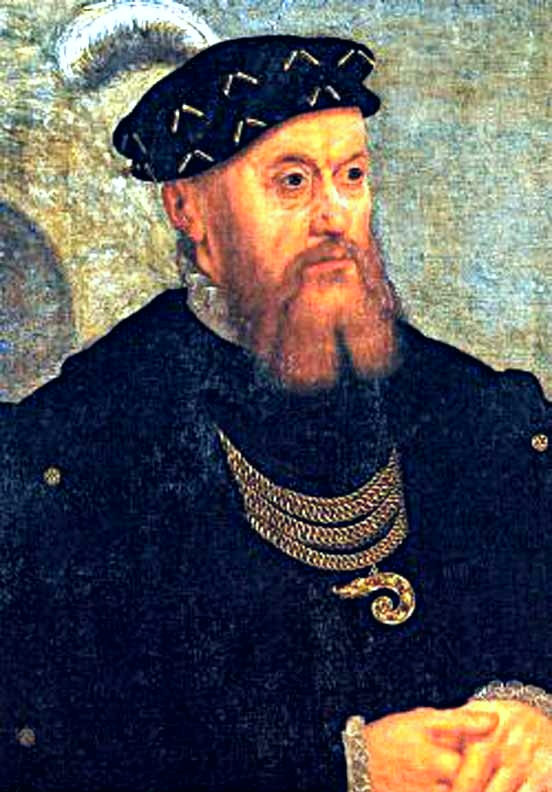
Candidate	Christian III
House	Oldenburg
Result	Elected
King before election
Frederick I
House of Oldenburg
Elected King
Christian III
House of Oldenburg

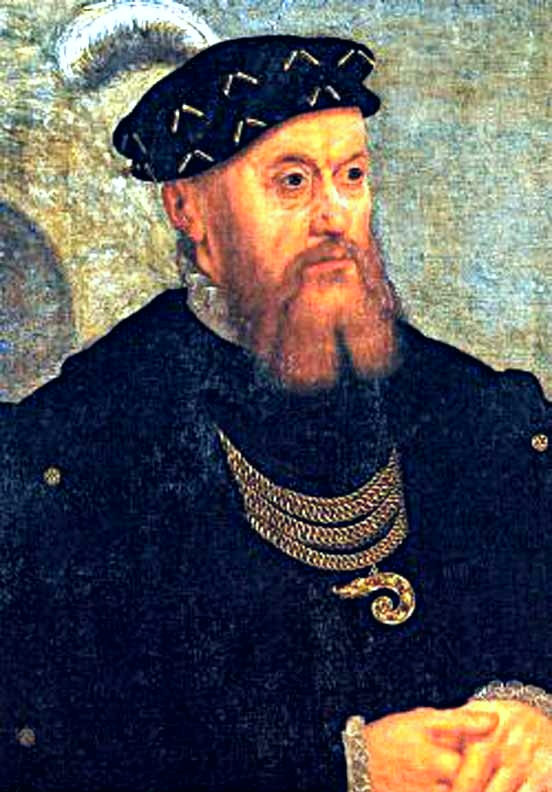
King Christian III carried out the Protestant Reformation in Schleswig, Holsten, Denmark and Norway

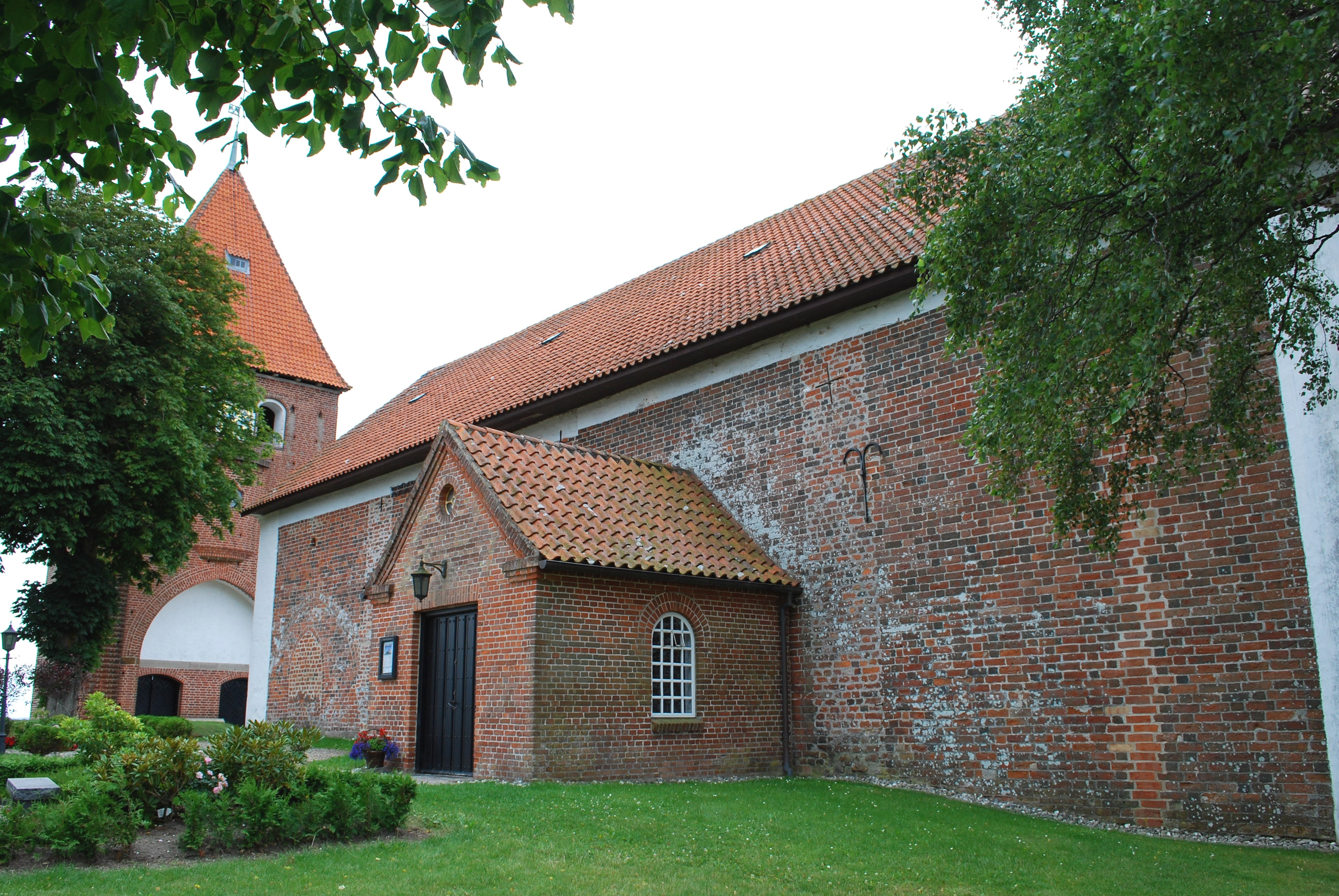
St. Søren's Church in Old Rye was the setting of the election

The election of Christian III as king of Denmark on 4 July 1534 was a landmark event for all of Denmark, and also had an effect on Norway's future relation with Denmark. It took place in St. Søren's Church (Danish: Sankt Sørens Kirke) in the town of Rye in eastern Jutland, where the Jutlandic nobility elected Prince Christian, son of King Frederick I and Duke of Schleswig and Holstein, as king. This brought about the Count's Feud (Grevens Fejde) and later also led to the implementation of the Protestant Reformation in Denmark in 1536 and Norway in 1537.

Christian (1503–1559) was a zealous Protestant who had witnessed the defence of Martin Luther at the Diet of Worms, and he had already carried out the Reformation in the Duchy of Holstein and Duchy of Schleswig. Christian's views made it difficult to gain the support of a majority of the Council of the Realm as most noblemen and, of course, the bishops would rather see a Roman Catholic king on the throne.

Among the supporters of Christian were Steward of the Realm, Mogens Gøye (ca. 1470–1544). Mogens Gøye was a Danish statesman and the Royal councillor of several Danish Kings. Gøye was among the originators of the meeting in Rye Church between eight Jutlandic members of the Council and the four Jutlandic bishops.

Members of the lesser nobility had also turned up – presumably on Mogens Gøye's initiative – but had to stay outside the church. The lengthy discussion about the election eventually made them lose patience, and they forced their way into the church and demanded to know who opposed the election of Prince Christian. After that, the opponents finally gave up. Ove Bille, Bishop of Aarhus, wept when he signed the request for the Protestant Duke to become king, realising that it would mean his own downfall.

Although hesitant, Christian accepted the election and was cheered at a meeting in Horsens on 18 August 1534, where he declared that he would, like his predecessors, sign a haandfæstning (charter), although with a reform of ecclesiastical affairs, i.e. the implementation of the Protestant Reformation in Denmark and Norway.

== Other sources ==
- Colding, Poul Studier i Danmarks politiske historie i slutningen af Christian IIs og begyndelsen af Frederik IIs tid (Copenhagen, 1939)
- Lausten, Martin Schwarz Christian 3. og kirken 1537–1559 (Copenhagen, 1987)
