= Old Rye =

Gammel Rye
- town
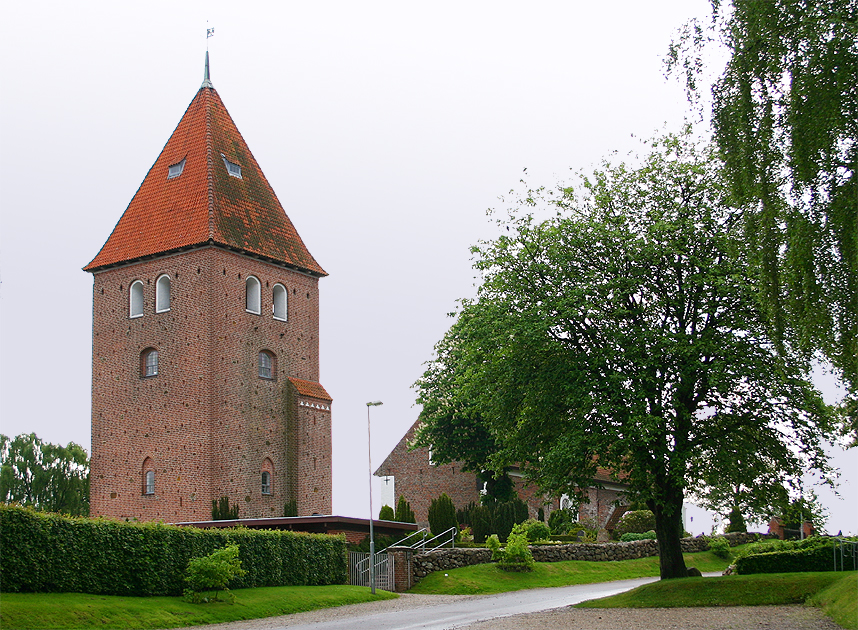
- The free standing tower at St. Søren's Church

- Location in Denmark Gammel Rye (Central Denmark Region)
- Coordinates: 56.0783°N 9.70139°E
- Country: Denmark
- Region: Central Denmark (Midtjylland)
- Municipality: Skanderborg

Area
  - Urban: 0.9 km^{2} (0.35 sq mi)

Population (2026)
  - Urban: 1,568
  - Urban density: 1,700/km^{2} (4,500/sq mi)
- Time zone: UTC+1 (CET)
  - Summer (DST): UTC+2 (CEST)
- Postal code: DK-8680 Ry

Old Rye (Danish: Gammel Rye) is a small town in eastern Jutland, Denmark, with a population of 1,568 (1 January 2026).

Rye was a very important market town in medieval Denmark. In 1534 AD, St. Søren's Church in Rye was the setting of the Election of Christian III as king of Denmark. Today, the town has been outgrown by the new town of Ry which, like so many other towns in Denmark, sprouted up around a railway station.

== Notable people ==
- Helle Virkner (born 1925 in Old Rye) a famous Danish actress and spouse of Prime Minister Jens Otto Krag
- Christina Siggaard (born 1994 in Old Rye) a Danish professional racing cyclist
- Mads Emil Madsen (born 1998 in Old Rye) a Danish footballer, who plays for AGF
