= Skibby Chronicle =

1530s Danish chronicle written in Latin

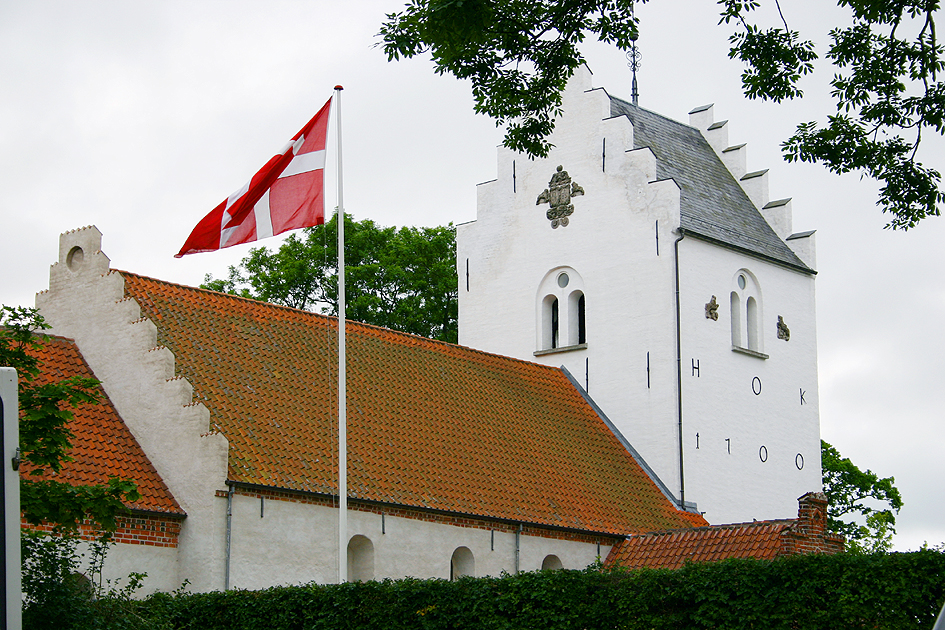
Skibby Church

The Skibby Chronicle (Danish: Skibbykrøniken, Latin: Chronicon Skibyense) is a Danish chronicle written in Latin and dating from the 1530s. It is preserved in a manuscript now held at the Arnamagnæan Institute. The manuscript was found during 1650, walled in behind the altar of Skibby Church (Skibby Kirke). It was printed in Latin 1773 and translated into Danish in 1890–1891.

== History ==
It was found in Skibby Church (Skibby Kirke) in North Zealand, Denmark. It is anonymous but according to many historians, the author was the outstanding humanist Poul Helgesen (Latin: Paulus Helie). Formally the work covers the period 1047–1534, but the main part covers events during the reigns of King Christian II and King Frederick I.

The work is a sometimes very personal description of Danish history during the last decades of Roman Catholicism, marked by the author's sympathy for and (mainly) antipathy against the political actors. Especially his portrait of Christian II is a very subjective one, affected by his negative attitude to the king's anti-aristocratic policy and his use of violence. Also Frederick I, regarded by Helgesen as a traitor to the Roman Catholic cause, is harshly treated. The description ends abruptly during the Count's Feud (1534–1536), perhaps because of Helgesen's death ca. 1534.

Formally the chronicle is built up very much like the annals, which means that great and small events are often mentioned together – deaths among the local clergy alternating with battles and wars – but it often contains valuable material. For instance, the nobility’s letter of complaint over Christian II is repeated.

In general the chronicle reflects the author’s bitterness, sorrow and frustration because of the course of events. His hot temper often breaks through, invectives and personal injuries reveal a man who was deeply engaged in the struggle. His hatred toward the Protestant agitators is just as outspoken as is his contempt and indignation at the last Roman Catholic bishops and their behaviour. In spite of this subjectivity, the chronicle makes an interesting picture of pre-Reformation Denmark viewed through the eyes of a disillusioned Reform Roman Catholic.
