= Hans Tausen =

Danish religious reformer (1494–1561)

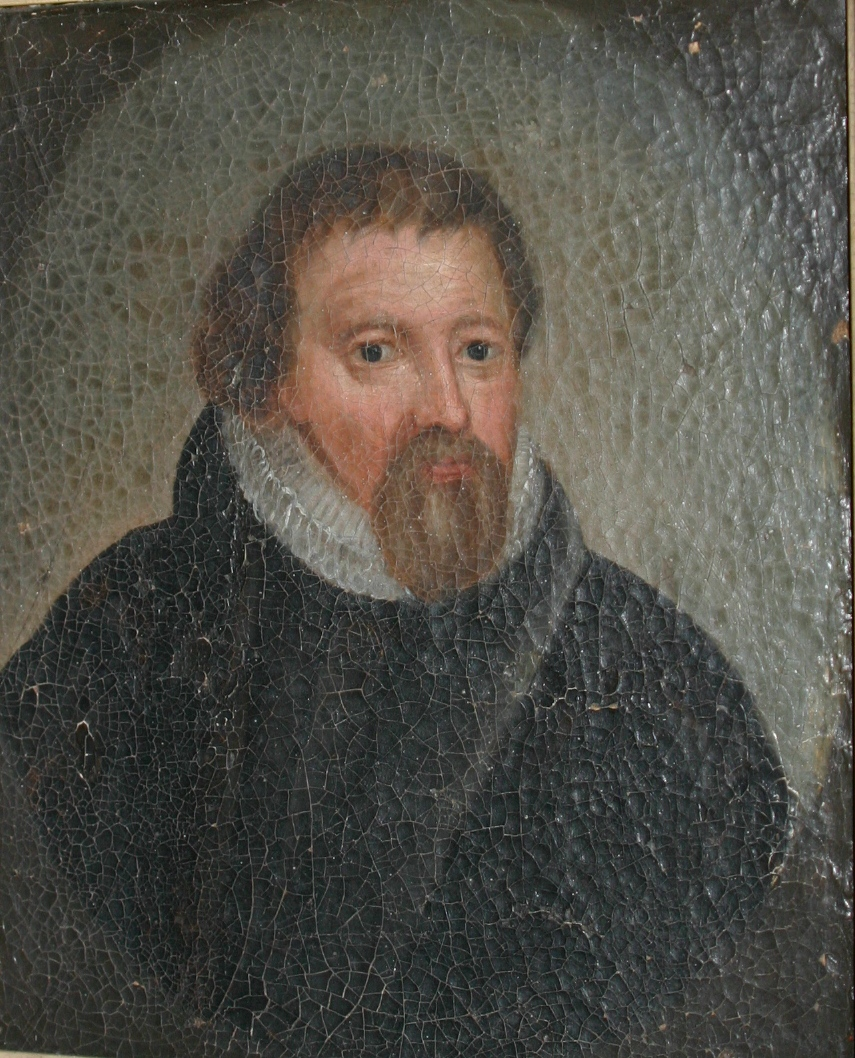
Hans Tausen as a young man

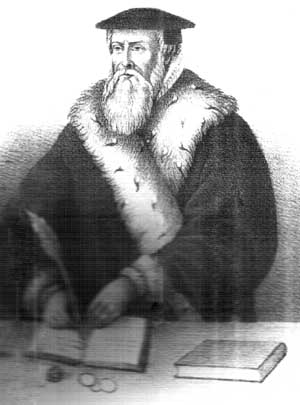
Hans Tausen as bishop

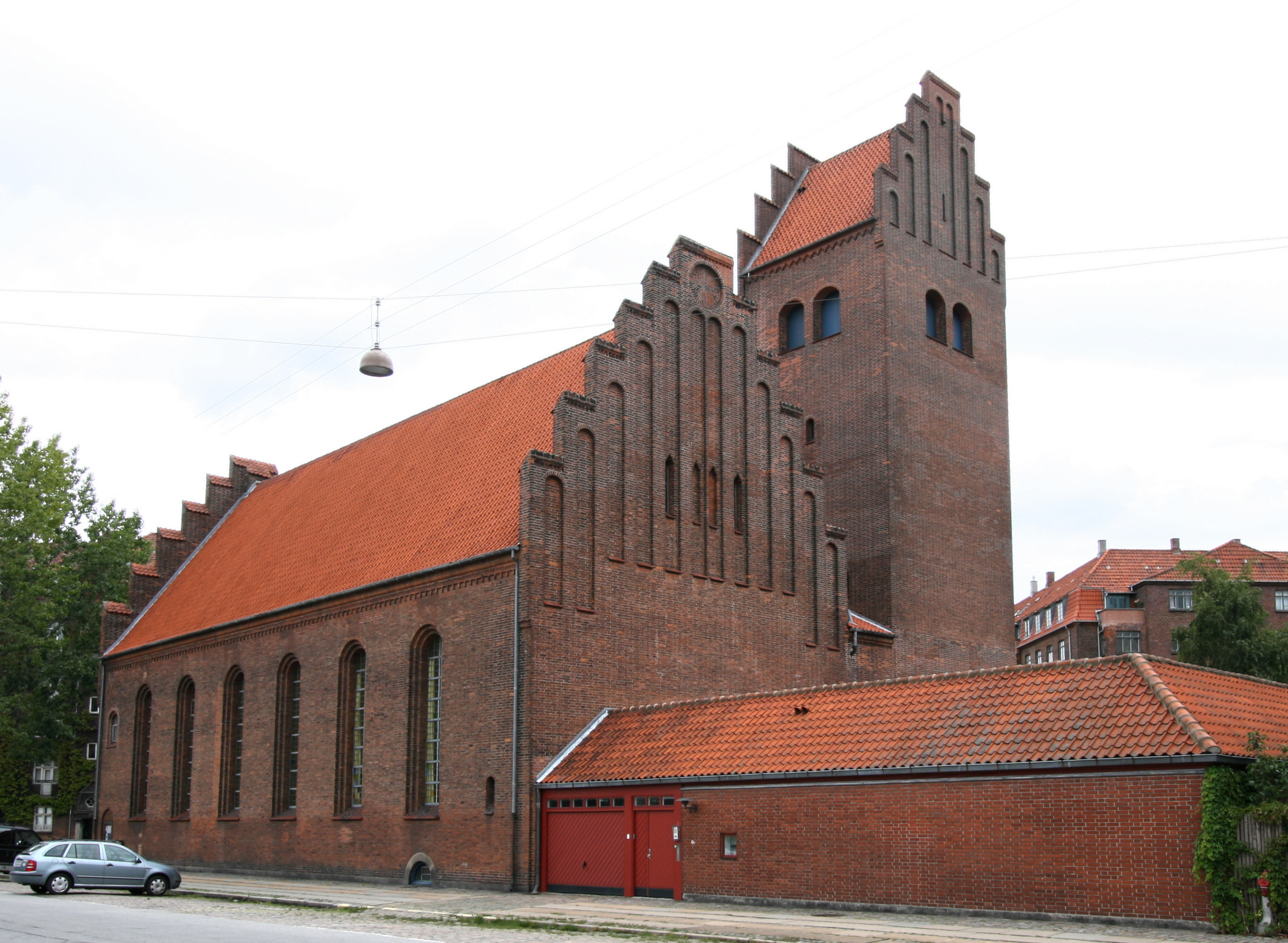
Hans Tausen's Church (1924), Copenhagen, Denmark

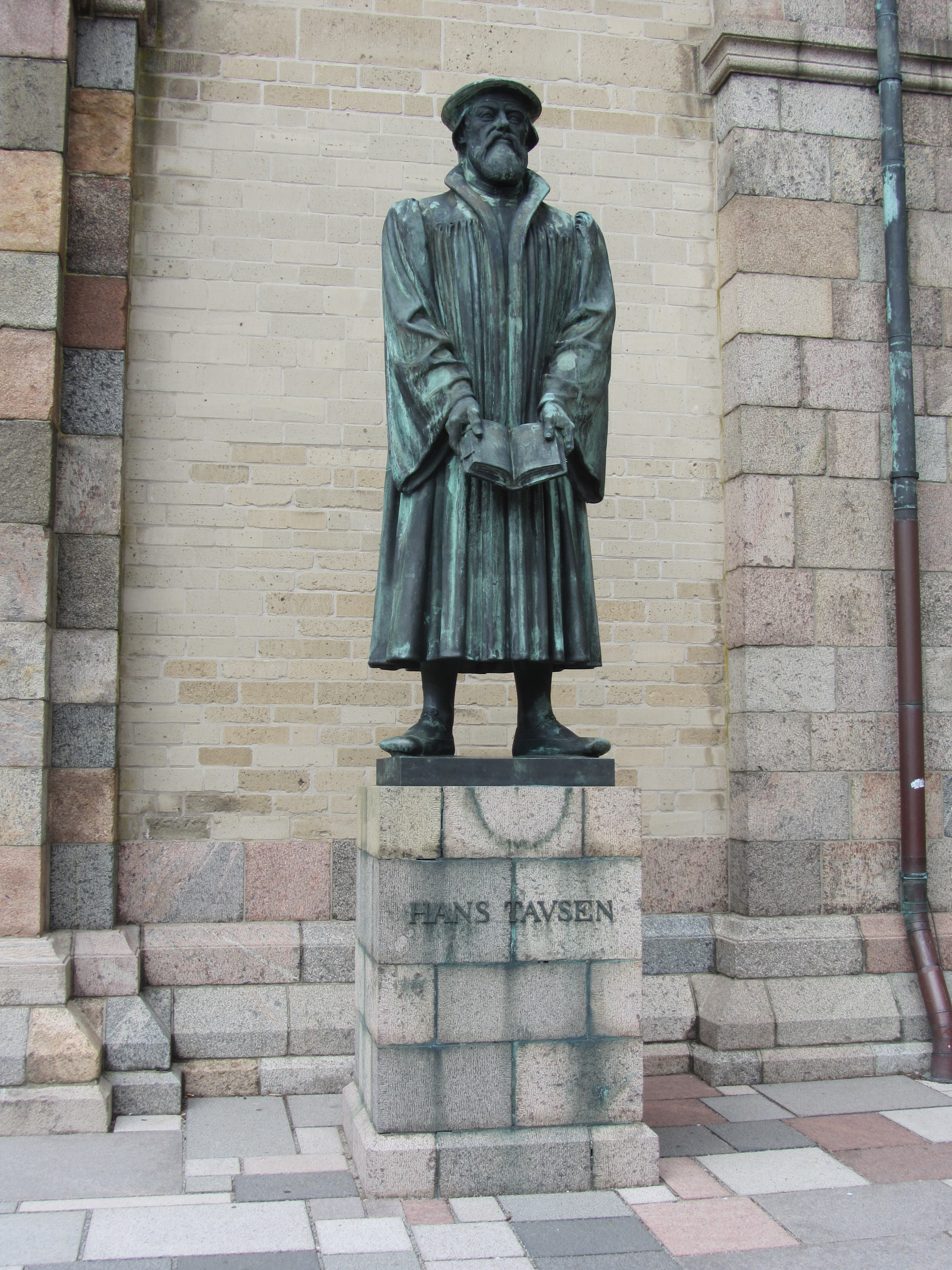
Hans Tausen statue in Ribe, Denmark

Hans Tausen (Tavsen) (1494 – 11 November 1561) nicknamed the "Danish Luther" was the leading Lutheran theologian of the Danish Reformation. He served as Bishop of Ribe and published the first translation of the Pentateuch into Danish in 1535.

== Background ==
Hans Tausen was born at Birkende on Funen in Denmark. Very little is known about his childhood and youth, but apparently he was a pupil at the grammar schools at Odense and Slagelse, finally settling down as a friar in the monastery of the Order of Saint John of Antvorskov near Slagelse. After studying at Rostock, where he got the degree of a Master of Arts and also after being ordained as a priest, he studied for a short time at the University of Copenhagen, and was then again sent abroad by his prior, visiting, among other places, the newly founded University of Leuven in Belgium and making the acquaintance of the Dutch humanists. He was already a good linguist, understanding both Latin and Hebrew. Subsequently, he translated the books of Moses from Hebrew.

== Career ==
In May 1523 Tausen went to Wittenberg, where he met Martin Luther and studied for a year and a half, when he was recalled to Antvorskov. In consequence of his professed attachment to the doctrines of Martin Luther he was transferred, in the spring of 1525, to the monastery of the Order of Saint John at Viborg in Jutland, where he continued to preach the Lutheran belief, and eventually was allowed to use the pulpit of the Saint Johns Church. Tausen's preaching was so revolutionary that he no longer felt safe within the Order of Saint John, so he discarded his religious habit and placed himself under the protection of the burgesses of Viborg. At first he preached in the parish church of St John, but this soon growing too small for him he addressed the people in the market-place from the church tower. When the Franciscans refused to allow him to preach in their large church, the mob broke in by force. A compromise was at last arranged, whereby the friars were to preach in the forenoon and Tausen in the afternoon. The bishop sent armed men to the church to arrest Tausen, but the burghers, who had brought their weapons with them, drove back the bishop's men. In October 1526 King Frederick I, during his visit to Aalborg, took Hans Tausen under his protection, appointed him one of his chaplains, and charged him to continue for a time to preach the Holy Gospel to the citizens of Viborg, who were to be responsible for his safety, thus identifying himself with the new doctrines in direct contravention of the plain letter of his coronation oath.

Tausen found a fellow-worker and reformer in Jørgen Sadolin (c. 1490– 1559), whose sister, Dorothea Jensdatter Sadolin (c. 1510–1537), he married, to the great scandal of the Roman Catholics. He was the first Danish priest to take a wife. He was also the first of the reformers who used the Danish language instead of Latin in the church services, the Even song he introduced at Viborg being of great beauty. Tausen was certainly the most practically gifted of all the new native teachers. But he was stronger as a preacher and an agitator than as a writer, the pamphlets which he now issued from the press of the German printer Hans Vingaard, who settled down at Viborg, being little more than adaptations of Luther's Opuscula. He continued to preach in the church of the Franciscan monastery, while Sadolin, whom he had consecrated a priest, officiated at the church of the Dominicans, who had already fled from the town. The Franciscans only yielded to violence persistently applied by the soldiers whom their opponents quartered upon them.

In 1529 Tausen's mission at Viborg came to an end. He was expelled from the Order of St. John. King Frederick now recommended him to Copenhagen to preach at the church of St Nicholas, but here he found an able and intrepid opponent in Bishop Rønne. Serious disturbances thereupon ensued; and the Protestants, getting the worst of the argument, silenced their gainsayers by insulting the bishops and priests in the streets and profaning and devastating the Catholic churches. A Herredag, was held at Copenhagen on 2 July 1530, ostensibly to mediate between the two conflicting confessions, but the king, from policy, and the nobility, from covetousness of the estates of the prelates, made no attempt to prevent the excesses of the Protestant rabble, openly encouraged by Tausen. On the other hand, the preachers failed to obtain the repeal of the Odense recess of 1527 which had subjected them to the spiritual jurisdiction of the prelates. On the death of King Frederick, Tausen, at the instance of Rønne, was, at the Herredag of 1533, convicted of blasphemy and condemned to expulsion from the diocese of Sjælland, whereupon the mob rose in arms against the bishop, who would have been murdered but for the intervention of Tausen, who conducted him home in safety. Rønne thereupon, from gratitude, permitted Tausen to preach in all his churches on condition that he moderated his tone. On the final triumph of the Reformation Tausen was appointed Bishop of Ribe (1542), an office he held for twenty years.

== Memorials ==
- Hans Tausen's Church at Islands Brygge was inaugurated on 30 November 1924.
- A modern monument in memory of Hans Tausen was erected in 2004, this time in Viborg, in commemoration of the town's 475th year since its reformation. The monument was made by the Danish artist Bjørn Nørgaard.

== Other sources ==
- Engelstoft & Dahl (ed.): Dansk Biografisk Leksikon (The Danish Dictionary of Biography), Copenhagen 1942
- Suhr, Tausens Levnet (Ribe, 1836); Danmarks Riges Historie, vol. III (Copenhagen, 1897–1905).
- Dreyer, Rasmus HC: "Hans Tausen mellem Luther og Zwingli. Studier i Hans Tausens teologi og den tidlige danske reformation" (Odense: Syddansk University Press 2020)
- Deryer, Rasmus HC: An Apologia for Luther: The myth of the Danish Luther: Danish reformer Hans Tausen and 'A short answer' (1528/29). In: Peter Obitz (ed.): "The Myth of the Reformation", Göttingen 2013, p. 211–232.
