= Reformation in Denmark–Norway and Holstein =

16th-century transition to Lutheranism

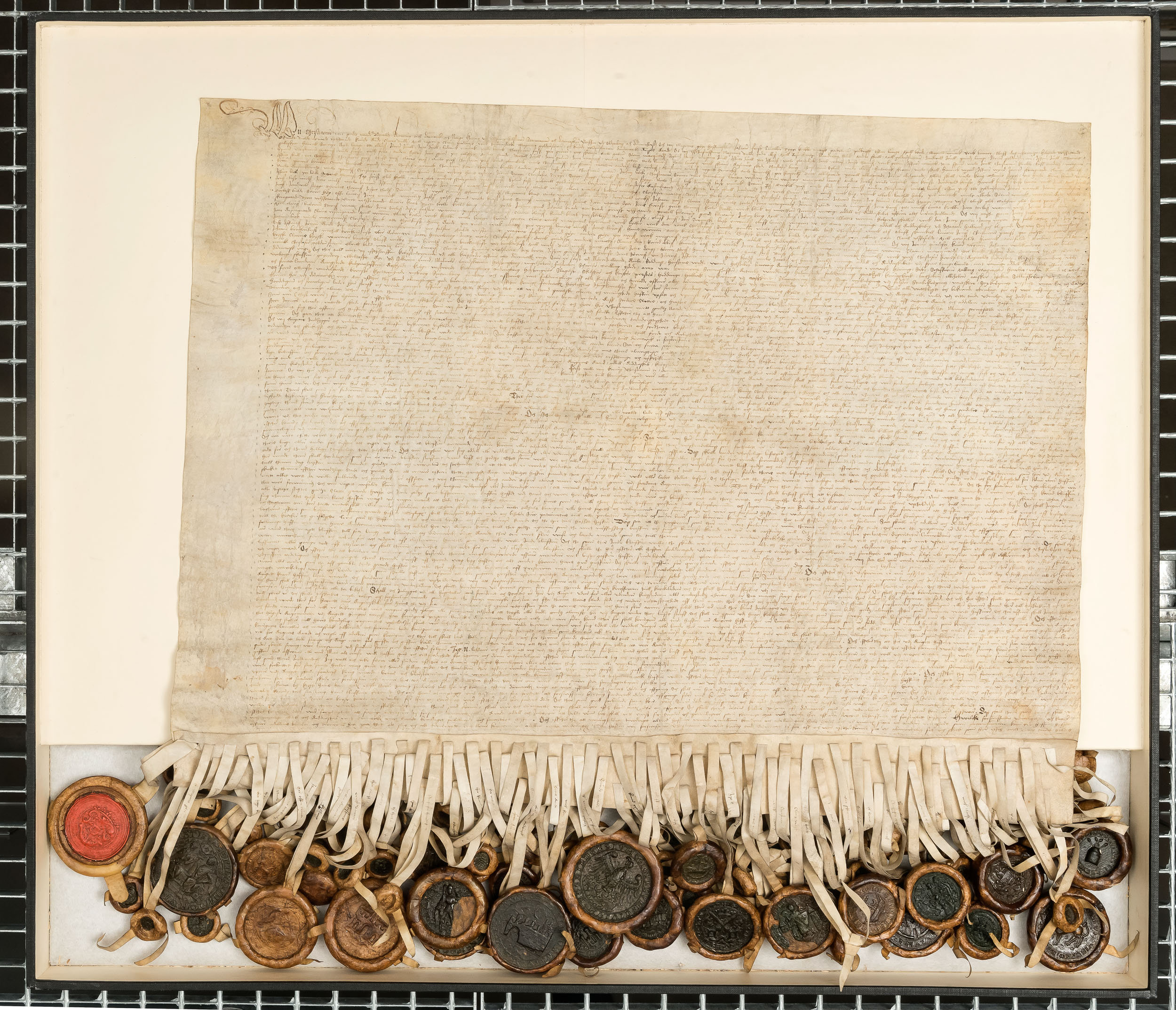
30 October 1536: The official implementation of the reformation in Denmark.

During the Reformation, the territories ruled by the Danish-based House of Oldenburg converted from Catholicism to Lutheranism. After the break-up of the Kalmar Union in 1521/1523, these realms included the kingdoms of Denmark (with the former east Danish provinces in Skåneland) and Norway (with Iceland, Greenland and the Faroe Islands) and the Duchies of Schleswig (a Danish fief) and Holstein (a German fief), whereby Denmark also extended over today's Gotland (now part of Sweden) and Øsel in Estonia.

The Reformation reached Holstein and Denmark in the 1520s. Lutheran figures like Hans Tausen, known as the "Luther of Denmark", gained considerable support in the population and from King Christian II, and though his successor Frederick I officially condemned the reformatory ideas, he tolerated their spread. His son Christian III officially introduced Lutheranism into his possessions in 1528, and on his becoming king in 1536/1537 after the Count's War, Lutheranism became official in all of Denmark–Norway. The Catholic bishops were removed and arrested, and the church was reorganized based on Lutheran church orders drawn up under the aegis of Luther's friend Johannes Bugenhagen in 1537 (Denmark–Norway) and 1542 (Holstein).

The Lutheran order established during the Protestant Reformation is the common root of the Church of Denmark, the Church of Norway, the Church of Iceland and the Church of the Faroe Islands. Nearly a century later would come Denmark-Norways's unsuccessful involvement in the Thirty Years' War under Christian IV, who led the defense of a Protestant coalition against the Catholic League's Counter-Reformation.

== Background, Gustaf Trolle, interdict and the need for a functioning church ==
The Catholic Archbishop of Uppsala in Sweden, Gustaf Trolle, and with the support of the Pope Leo X, was in conflict with the Swedish regent Sten Sture the Younger and Sweden's parliament, the Riksdag, due to the parliament's demolition of the archbishop's Almarestäket's castle in 1518. Trolle was pro-union (the Kalmar Union) and was allied with Christian II who made a unionist conquest of Sweden in the autumn of 1520. Trolle was reinstated as archbishop and the Stockholm Bloodbath was carried out.

Trials in Stockholm between 7 and 9 November 1520 led to a series of immediate executions of 84 people, among them fourteen noblemen, three burgomasters, fourteen town councillors and about twenty common citizens of Stockholm hanged or beheaded, many of them MPs. The pope gave Trolle the right in writing to excommunicate the parliament by canon law from the Catholic Church and execute them as heretics and interdict (church strike) were announced against them.

Trolle was forced to flee to Denmark in 1521 during the Swedish War of Liberation, during which Gustav Vasa came to power in Sweden with the support of the excommunicated parliament. Despite Trolle's position and his support from the Pope, Gustav Vasa refused to recognize him as archbishop and rejected Trolle as a traitor. The pressure from Rome was a contributing factor for why Gustav Vasa never re-established the relationship with the Vatican, and introduced Protestantism by initiating the Reformation in Sweden.

While in Denmark, Trolle ended up on the losing side of political conflict by backing Christian II, who had been deposed and replaced as king by Frederick I of Denmark and Frederick's successor Christian III. As enemies of Christian II and Trolle, Frederick I and later Christian III also had a strained relationship with the papacy who backed the Catholic Christian II. In the Count's Feud (1534–1536), the papacy and Trolle supported the losing side again by supporting the pro-Christian II faction. At the end of the war in 1536, when Christian III entered Copenhagen, Archbishop Torben Bille was arrested along with two other bishops who were in the city at the time. The other bishops of the kingdom were arrested around the country.

The nobles took power and the king called for a lord's day in Copenhagen on 20 October 1536. At this, it was decided that the bishops would be deposed and their estates confiscated by the crown. The cathedral chapters and monasteries were allowed to continue their activities until they were reformed. The monks of the monasteries were allowed to leave the monasteries, but if they chose to stay, they would preach Lutheran texts. Christian III demanded that the councilors assure that no future bishop would be allowed to exercise secular power in Denmark.

Christian III worked to organize a princely national church, which was independent from the papacy in Rome and the Catholic Church. A new church order was drawn up by order of the king in 1537 and could be implemented in final form in 1539. The bishops were replaced as diocesan chiefs by superintendents, a title which became short-lived and soon returned to the name bishop. These would be appointed by the king and they would not be allowed to earn any major income. The parish priests were instructed to preach the Gospel, and the congregation was to be brought up in the Gospel doctrine. Lutheran Catechism was introduced for children. Thus, the Reformation had been fully implemented in Denmark.

== Spread of reformatory ideas ==
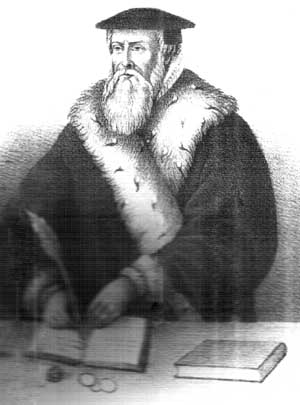
Hans Tausen was one of the first Lutheran preachers and later bishops in Denmark.

Already in 1525, Hans Tausen, a Knight Hospitaller from the monastery of Antvorskov, had begun preaching Lutheran doctrines in Viborg. In the years hereafter, the Lutheran movement began spreading throughout the country, and although King Frederick I had pledged in his håndfæstning ('charter') to fight against Lutheranism, he nevertheless issued an edict to the citizens of Viborg in 1526, obliging them to protect Hans Tausen.

The Evangelical movement had its origins in Germany, where Martin Luther posted his Ninety-five Theses in 1517. The movement quickly gained great influence in Denmark, although humanists like Poul Helgesen long tried to maintain a reform movement within the Catholic Church instead of abolishing it altogether as the Lutherans would.

During the early 1530s, the king's passivity encouraged the people to attack monasteries and churches. The former king Christian II, who had lived in exile since 1526, took advantage of the unrest and issued propaganda writings, agitating for himself and the new Lutheran doctrine. When Frederick I died in 1533, the Council of the Realm could not come to an agreement on who should be the new king. A Catholic majority preferred Frederick's 12-year-old son Hans the Elder of Schleswig-Holstein-Haderslev while a minority supported Hans' half-brother Christian who as duke of Slesvig and Holsten had introduced Lutheranism there during the 1520s.

The election of a new king was postponed for a year due to the disagreement. In the meantime, the Council of the Realm governed the country, allowing the bishops to decide what could be preached in their respective dioceses. Hans Tausen was accused of heresy and banished from Zealand but the bishop of Roskilde called him back after only one month. Discontent with the nobility taking over control of the country through the Council made citizens from Malmö and Copenhagen along with farmers, especially from northern Jutland, rally around the exiled Christian II.

The Council decided to join a Netherlandic–Slesvigian–Holsatian alliance instead of Lübeck, which by Mayor Jürgen Wullenwever had been represented at the Council's meeting.

== Election of Christian III and Count's Feud ==
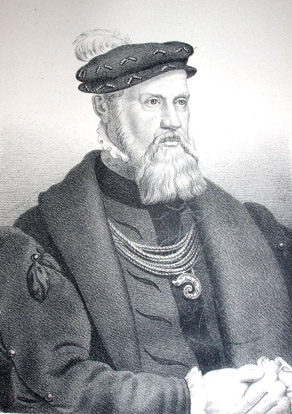
The election of Christian III was decisive for the Reformation in Denmark.

In January 1534, the city government of Malmø led by Mayor Jørgen Kock refused to comply with an order from the bishop of Lund to expel the Lutheran preachers. Malmø had already for long been a centre of Evangelical activities and responded to the order by occupying Malmø Castle and arresting the overlord. In May, this rebellion was followed up by the German Count Christopher of Oldenburg attacking Holsten. He had been hired by Kock of Malmø and Wullenwever of Lübeck to conquer Denmark, officially in order to restore Christian II. Christopher's participation in the following two years of civil war named it the Count's Feud. The count's main objective was not Holsten but Zealand, where he sailed and he quickly gained control of all Danish territory east of the Great Belt.

On 4 July 1534, representatives of Jutlandic nobility and councillors met in Rye in eastern Jutland. Here the lesser nobility forced the bishops to nominate the Lutheran Christian, Duke of Slesvig and Holsten to the kingship. When the nobility of Funen joined them, Christian agreed and homage was paid to him as King Christian III on 18 August that year in Horsens.

After both Funen and Jutland had rebelled and Sweden and Prussia had become involved in the war in Scania, Lübeck withdrew from the struggle in January 1536. On 6 April, Malmø surrendered, though without losing either privileges or Evangelical doctrine. After the population had starved for months, Copenhagen surrendered. Mayor Ambrosius Bogbinder committed suicide. Like Malmø, Copenhagen did not lose its privileges, and the rebels were granted an amnesty.

== The Reformation in Denmark ==
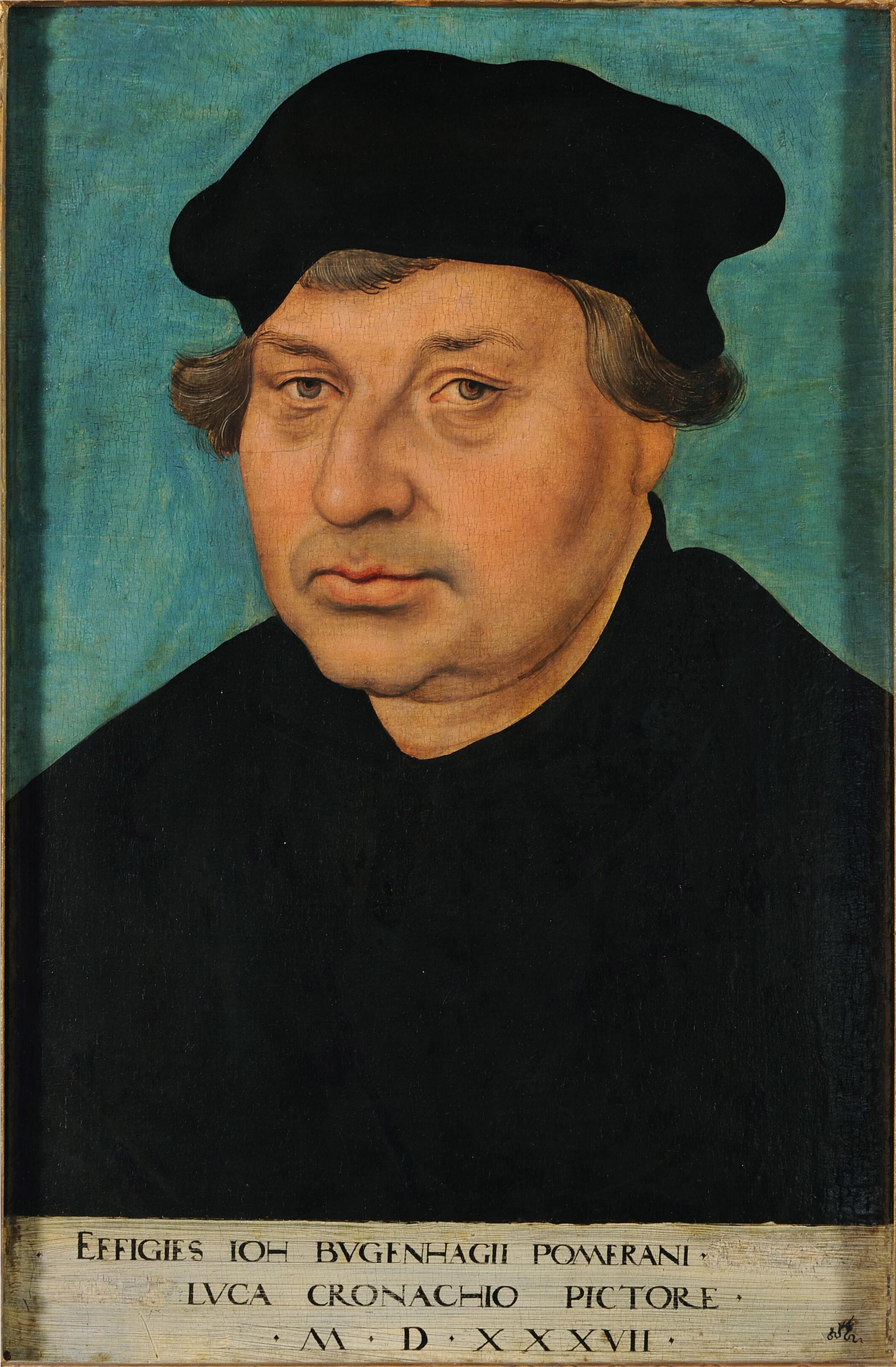
Johannes Bugenhagen consecrated the first Lutheran bishops ('superintendents') in Denmark.

Christian III marched into Copenhagen on 6 August 1536. Six days later he carried out a coup. The three bishops who dwelt in Copenhagen were arrested and the rest were tracked down and arrested. The official reason was their hesitation to elect Christian as king and other alleged criminal acts. The real reason was that Christian wanted to kill two birds with one stone: carry through a Lutheran Reformation and confiscate the bishops' properties, the profits from which were needed to cover the expenses of the recently ended civil war.

Before Christian III came to power in all Denmark–Norway after the Count's Feud, he had already implemented the Reformation in his realms of Haderslev (Hadersleben) and Tørning (Tørninglen, Törninglehn), two domains in southern Jutland which he had received in 1524. A convinced Lutheran since his encounter with Luther at the Diet of Worms in 1521, Christian III introduced a Lutheran church order in his domains in 1528, laid out in the twenty-two Haderslev articles.

In 1536, he wanted to implement a similar order for the whole kingdom. The Haderslev articles had already introduced the office of a superintendent, and the arrest of the bishops – who had not supported his election and neither were willing to bear any of his war costs – made way to the assignment of Lutheran superintendents in all of Denmark-Norway.

After the coup, Christian III contacted Martin Luther and Johannes Bugenhagen, whom he had first met in 1529. Both congratulated the king. His subsequent request to the elector of Saxony to immediately deploy Melanchthon or Bugenhagen to Denmark was denied, but the elector was willing to do so once a rough draft of a Danish Lutheran church order had been provided by Danish theologians. Christian III could thereby rely on a pool of capable Danish Lutherans who all had studied at the University of Wittenberg. Among them were Peder Palladius, Jørgen Sadolin, Hans Tausen and Frans Vormordsen.

A synode was held in Odense where the draft was begun, and the work continued in Haderslev thereafter. The first draft was based primarily on the Haderslev articles, also on the Saxon script Unterricht der Visitatoren ("Visitators' lessons"), on Bugenhagen's Van menigherleie christliken saken ("Of several Christian matters"), on the liturgical writings of Luther and Danish liturgical writings. In April 1537, the draft was sent to Wittenberg for approval, whereupon the elector allowed Bugenhagen to depart for Denmark.

Danish superintendencies established in 1537
Area	See	Superintendent
Zealand	Roskilde	Peder Palladius
Funen-Lolland-Falster	Odense	Georg Viburg
Jutland (part)	Vendelbo/Ålborg	Peder Thom
Jutland (part)	Århus	Matthias Lang
Jutland (part)	Ribe	Johann Vandal
Jutland (part)	Viborg	Jacob Scaning
Scania	Lund	Frans Vormordsen

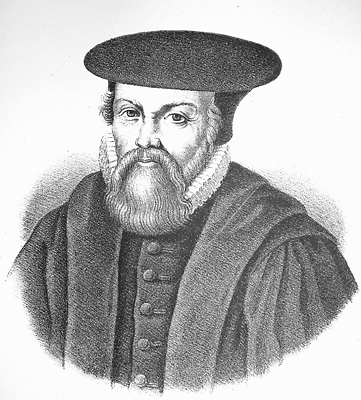
Peder Palladius

After Bugenhagen had revised and amended the draft, it was translated from Latin to Danish and presented to the rigsrådet. After a second revision by Bugenhagen, the church order was completed and signed by Christian III on 2 September 1537 as Ordinatio ecclesiastica regnorum Daniae et Norwegiae et ducatuum Slesvicencis, Holtsatiae etc. etc. ("Church order of the kingdoms of Denmark and Norway and the duchies of Schleswig and Holstein etc."). In Denmark, seven superintendancies were established, replacing the former bishoprics.

The superintendents were to meet with the king in synodes, the upper clergy with the superintendents in landemoders, and the lower with the upper clergy in kalenters. The king was to have no theological authority besides approving the superintendents. The superintendents were not to hold fiefs or secular offices – a rule which was not followed strictly. Likewise, Christian III often intervened in the church's affairs.

The church order turned against the veneration of saints, fast days, celibacy and everything else that was considered papistic foolery, and instead decreed church services to be performed in Danish. Most monks and nuns were allowed to stay in their monasteries and convents, except the grey friars.

Priests were allowed to keep their churches until they died. Only when the last monk or nun had died would a monastery be added to the property of the Crown. Thus, in spite of more fierce procedures followed, especially by bishop Peder Palladius on Zealand, the Reformation progressed as a relatively bloodless affair in Denmark.

A Danish translation of the Latin Ordinatio ecclesiastica was approved by the rigsrådet as a law in 1539. Bugenhagen left Denmark the same year. He returned in 1542 to mediate negotiations with the gentry of Holstein, who had delayed the implementation of the church order there. On 9 March 1542, the Schleswig-Holsteinische Kirchenordnung ("Church order of Schleswig-Holstein") was approved by the Landtag in Rendsburg after a revision by Bugenhagen. Implementation of the church order in Norway proved more difficult, and even more so in Iceland, where it was implemented in 1552 after the execution of bishop Jón Arason in 1550, and contested by the local population until the seventeenth century.

In addition to working on the Danish church order, Bugenhagen crowned Christian III and his wife Dorothea with a Lutheran ritual on 12 August 1537, the king's thirty-fourth birthday, and the first anniversary of the arrest of the Roman Catholic bishops. The coronation as well as the inauguration of the superintendents, which was also performed by Bugenhagen, took place in Our Lady's Church in Copenhagen. Also in 1537, the University of Copenhagen, closed since the Count's War, was modelled by Bugenhagen after Wittenberg was re-opened as a Lutheran university. In 1550, the "Christian III Bible" was first printed, a translation of Luther's Bible by Christiern Pederson on behalf of Christian III. In 1556, Peder Palladius published the "Altar Book", a compendium of Lutheran liturgy, which did not become binding in all of Denmark.

== The Reformation in Norway ==
The Reformation in Norway was accomplished by force in 1537. Christian III declared Lutheranism to be the official religion of Norway, sending the Catholic archbishop, Olav Engelbrektsson, into exile in Lier in the Netherlands, now in Belgium. Catholic priests and bishops were persecuted, monastic orders were suppressed, and the crown took over church property, while some churches were plundered and abandoned, even destroyed.

Bishops, initially called superintendents, were appointed by the king. The first superintendent was Gjeble Pederssøn who served as superintendent of Bjørgvin from 1537 to 1557. In 1541, Stavanger and Oslo got their first superintendents, Jon Guttormssøn and Hans Rev. In 1546, Torbjørn Bratt became the first superintendent in Trondheim.

In 1537, Christian III also made Norway a hereditary kingdom in a real union with Denmark, which would last until 1814, when Frederick VI ceded Norway to Charles XIII of Sweden.

== The Reformation in Iceland ==
The Icelandic Reformation took place from 1539 to 1550. Iceland was at this time a territory ruled by Denmark-Norway, and Lutheran religious reform was imposed on the Icelanders by Christian III. The Icelandic Reformation was concluded with the execution of Jón Arason, Catholic bishop of Hólar, and his two sons, in 1550, after which the country adopted Lutheranism.

== Sources ==
=== Bibliography ===
- Grell, Ole Peter (1995). The Scandinavian Reformation. From evangelical movement to institutionalisation of reform (2 ed.). Cambridge University Press. ISBN 0-521-44162-5.
- Lockhart, Paul Douglas (2007). Denmark, 1513–1660. The rise and decline of a Renaissance monarchy. Oxford University Press. ISBN 978-0-19-927121-4.
- Lorentzen, Tim (2008). Johannes Bugenhagen als Reformator der öffentlichen Fürsorge. Studies in the Late Middle Ages, Humanism and the Reformation (in German). Vol. 44. Mohr Siebeck. ISBN 978-3-16-149613-4.
- Wylie, James A. (2002). The History of Protestantism. Hartland Publications. ISBN 0-923309-80-2.
