= Ancient Diocese of Aarhus =

Roman Catholic diocese in Denmark (948-1536)

Diocese of Aarhus Dioecesis Arusiensis Aarhus Stift
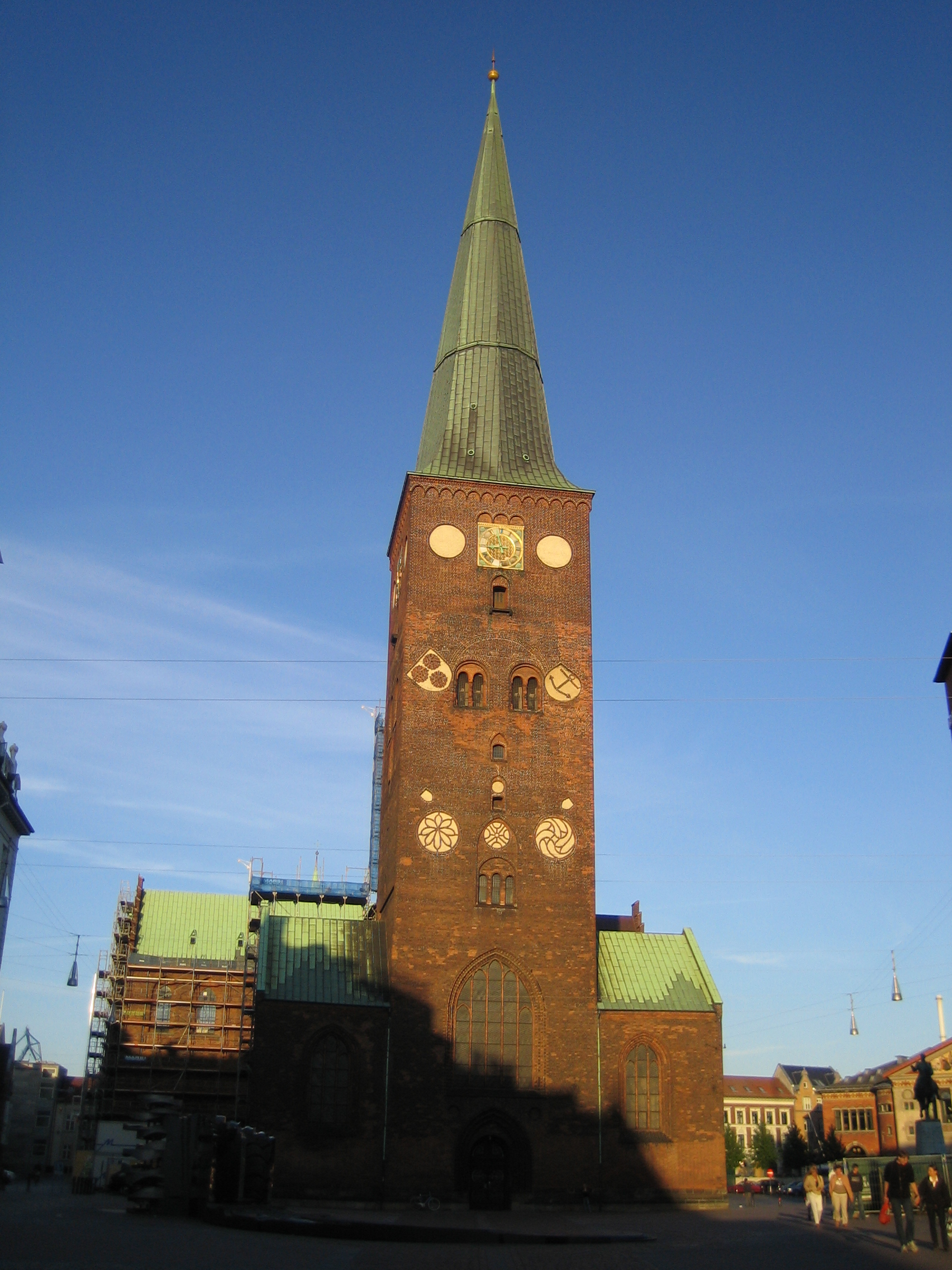
- Aarhus Cathedral, seat of the bishop of Aarhus.

Location
- Country: Denmark
- Ecclesiastical province: Lund
- Metropolitan: Archdiocese of Lund

Information
- Denomination: Roman Catholic
- Sui iuris church: Latin Church
- Rite: Roman Rite
- Established: 948
- Dissolved: 1536
- Cathedral: Aarhus Cathedral

The former Diocese of Aarhus (Danish: Aarhus Stift) was a Roman Catholic diocese in Denmark, founded in the 10th century and dissolved during the Protestant Reformation. The diocese included the counties of Aarhus and Randers, the islands of Samsø and Tunø, and, after 1396, part of the county of Viborg.

== History ==
Frode, King of Jutland, built the church of the Holy Trinity at Aarhus in about 900. In 948 Archbishop Adaldag of Hamburg consecrated Reginbrand as missionary Bishop of Aarhus. Jutland was consolidated into a single diocese after Reginbrand's death in 988, with Viborg or Ribe as its centre. The diocese, then a suffragan of Hamburg-Bremen, was redivided in 1060, and Bishop Christian was ordained by Adalbert I, Archbishop of Hamburg. In 1104 the diocese became a suffragan of the then newly elevated Archdiocese of Lund.

Bishop Ulfketil built a wooden church in 1102 to contain the relics of Saint Clement. Around 1150, Niels, Prince of Denmark was buried in the churchyard. The offerings at his tomb facilitated the commencement of a new stone cathedral. Peder Vognsen, Svend Udsson's successor, began the construction of the brick Cathedral of Saint Clement in 1201, which was finished around 1263. In 1330, the greater part of it burned down. Peder Jensen Lodehat (1386–1395) and Bo Magnussen (1395–1423) were the prelates mainly concerned with the erection of the present building, Aarhus Cathedral.

In the 16th century, the last Catholic bishop, Ove Bille resisted the Reformation along with Poul Helgesen, prior of the Carmelite monastery at Elsinore. Like the other Catholic bishops in Denmark, Ove Bille was imprisoned in 1536. The Diocese and its infrastructure were seized by the crown in 1536, and later reinstated as the Protestant Diocese of Aarhus within the Church of Denmark.

== Religious orders ==
Religious orders within the diocese included: a chapter with 34 prebendaries at Aarhus cathedral; Benedictines at Esbenbeek, Voer, Alling, and Veierlov; Augustinian Canons at Tvilum, Cistercians at Øm, who survived till 1560; and Carthusians at Aarhus. There were also Franciscans at Horsens and Randers, Dominicans at Aarhus, Horsens, and Randers, Carmelites and a hospital of the Holy Spirit at Aarhus. There were Hospitallers of St. John until 1568 at Horsens. Lastly there were Brigittines at Mariager from 1412 to 1592.

== List of bishops ==
- Reginbrand, 948–988, Anointed by Adaldag of Hamburg-Bremen.
  - Vacant (988–1060)
- Christian, c. 1060–??, participated in one of the last Viking raids in 1069–1070.
- Ulfketil, 1102–1134, died in the Battle of Fotevik
- Eskil, ??–1157, died during the raid of Wendland
  - Vacant (1157–1165)
- Svend I, 1165–1191, founded the Cistercian abbey at Øm
- Peder Vognsen, 1191–1204, initiated Aarhus Cathedral
- Skjalm Vognsen, 1204–1215
- Ebbe Vognsen, 1215–1224
- Peder Elevsøn, 1224–1246
  - Vacant (1246–1249)
- Peder Ugotsøn, 1249–1260
- Tycho I, 1261–1272
- Peder IV, 1272–1276
- Tycho II, 1276–1288
- Jens Assersøn, 1288–1306
- Esger Juul, 1306–1310
- Esger Bonde, 1310–1325
- Svend II, 1325–1352
- Paul, 1352–1369
- Olufsen, 1369–1386
- Peder Jensen Lodehat, 1386–1395
- Bo Mogensen, 1395–1424
- Ulrik Stygge, 1424–1449
- Jens Iversen Lange, 1449–1482
- Ejler Madsen Bølle, 1482–1490
- Niels Clausen, 1490–1520
- Ove Bille, 1520–1536

== See also ==
- Diocese of Aarhus
- List of bishops of Aarhus
