= List of bishops of Aarhus =

The succession of bishops of Aarhus began when the bishop of Aarhus Reginbrand was first mentioned by Adam of Bremen as attending the Synod of Ingelheim.

== Catholic See ==
- Reginbrand, 948–988, Ordained by Adaldag of Hamburg-Bremen
- Vacant (988–1060)
- Christian, 1060–??, Participated in one of the last Viking raids in 1069–70
- Ulfketil, 1102–1134, Fell in the Battle of Fotevik
- Eskil, ??–1157, Fell during raid to Wendland
- *Vacant (1157–1165)
- Svend I, 1165–1191, Founded the Cistercian abbey at Øm
- Peder Vognsen, 1191–1204, Initiated Aarhus Cathedral
- Skjalm Vognsen, 1204–1215
- Ebbe Vognsen, 1215–1224
- Peder Elevsøn, 1224–1246
  - Vacant (1246–1249)
- Peder Ugotsøn, 1249–1260
- Tyge, 1261–1272
- Peder IV, 1272–1276
- Tyge II, 1276–1288
- Jens Assersøn, 1288–1306
- Esger Juul, 1306–1310
- Esger Bonde, 1310–1325
- Svend II, 1325–1352
- Paul, 1352–1369
- Olufsen, 1369–1386
- Peder Jensen Lodehat, 1386–1395
- Bo Mogensen, 1395–1424
- Ulrik Stygge, 1424–1449
- Jens Iversen Lange, 1449–1482
- Ejler Madsen Bølle, 1482–1490
- Niels Clausen, 1490–1520
- Ove Bille, 1520–1536

== After reformation ==
- Mads Lang, 1537–1557
- Lauritz Bertelsen, 1557–1587
- Peder Jensen Vinstrup, 1587–1590
- Albert Hansen, 1590–1593
- Jens Gjødesen, 1593–1626
- Morten Madsen, 1626–1643
  - Vacant (1643–1645)
- Jacob Matthiesen, 1645–1660
- Hans Brochmand, 1660–1664
- Erik Grave, 1664–1691
- Johannes Bræm, 1691–1713
- Johannes Ocksen, 1713–1738
- Peder Jacobsen Hygom, 1738–1764
- Poul Mathias Bildsøe, 1764–1777
- Jørgen Hee, 1777–1788
- Hector Frederik Janson, 1788–1805
- Andreas Birch, 1805–1829
- Peter Hans Mønster, 1829–1830
- Jens Paludan-Müller, 1830–1845
- Gerhard Peter Brammer, 1845–1881
- Bruun Juul Fog, 1881–1884
- Johannes Clausen, 1884–1905
- Fredrik Nielsen, 1905–1907
- Hans Sophus Sørensen, 1907–1916
- Thomas Schiøler, 1916–1931
- Fritz Bruun Rasmussen, 1931–1940
- Skat Hoffmeyer, 1940–1962
- Kaj Jensen, 1962–1963
- Henning Høirup, 1963–1980
- Herlof Eriksen, 1980–1994
- Kjeld Holm, 1994–2015
- Henrik Wigh-Poulsen, 2015–present

== See also ==
- Diocese of Aarhus
- Timeline of Aarhus
