= List of people from Aarhus =

A person who lives in or comes from Aarhus, Denmark, is called an Aarhusian (Aarhusianer). This is a list of well known people who were born, lived, or grew up in the city of Aarhus.

== People by field ==
Politics

- Svend Unmack Larsen (1893–1965), Mayor of Aarhus, Minister of Justice
- Hans Hedtoft (1903–1955), Prime Minister
- H. C. Hansen (1906–1960), Prime Minister
- Marichen Nielsen (1921–2014), MP, MEP (Social Democrats)
- Thorkild Simonsen (1926–2022), Mayor of Aarhus, Minister of Interior Affairs
- Svend Auken (1943–2009), Minister of Labour, Leader of The Social Democrats party, Minister of the Environment and Energy
- Uffe Elbæk (b. 1954), politician and founder of the KaosPilot school, Minister of Culture, founder and leader of The Alternative party
- Nicolai Wammen (b. 1971), Mayor of Aarhus, Minister for European Affairs, Minister of Defence, Minister for Finance
- Morten Østergaard (b. 1976), Deputy Prime Minister, Minister, Leader of the Danish Social Liberal Party
- Linea Søgaard-Lidell (b. 1987), MEP, MP
- Marie Jepsen (1940–2018), MEP

Business

- Hans Broge (1822-1908), businessman, entrepreneur, member of the city council
- Søren Frich (1827-1901), industrialist, member of the city council
- Laurits Christian Meulengracht (1827-1903), businessman, director of the Ceres breweries, member of the city council
- Otto Mønsted (1838–1916), businessman, member of the city council
- Anders Holch Povlsen (b. 1972), owner of Bestseller

Science

- Lars Bak (b. 1965), computer scientist
- Ole Barndorff-Nielsen (1935–2022), statistician
- Drude Dahlerup (b. 1945), Professor of Political Science
- Ivan Damgård (b. 1956) cryptographer
- Lene Hau (b. 1959), physicist
- William Hovgaard (1857–1957), professor of naval design and construction
- H.O. Lange (1863-1943), librarian and egyptologist
- Ole Rømer (1644–1710), astronomer
- Jens Christian Skou (1918–2018), physiologist, Nobel laureate in chemistry 1997
- Bjarne Stroustrup (b. 1950), computer scientist
- Øjvind Winge (1886–1964) Yeast geneticist
- Ole Worm (1588–1655), physician, scholar and antiquarian

Sports

- Johan Andersen (1920-2003), sprint canoeist, World Champion
- Stig Tøfting (b. 1969), footballer
- Martin Jørgensen (b. 1975), footballer
- Martin Kampmann (b. 1982), UFC Fighter
- Sara Petersen (b. 1987), hurdler, European Champion
- Dennis Ceylan (b. 1989), boxer, European Champion (EBU)
- Andrej Lawaetz Bendtsen (b. 1990), rower, World Champion
- Line Kjærsfeldt (b. 1994), Badminton player, European champion

Music and culture

- Morten Børup (1446–1526), educator, cathedral cantor, writer
- Heinrich Ernst Grosmann (1732–1811), cantor, composer
- Gabriel Axel (1918–2014), film director (Oscar winner 1988), actor, writer and producer
- Kai Winding (1922–1983), American jazz trombonist
- Erling Møldrup (1943–2016), classical guitarist
- Nils Malmros (b. 1944), film director, screenwriter
- Gitte Hænning (b. 1946), singer and film actress
- Flemming Jørgensen (Bamse) (1947–2011), singer, songwriter, guitarist and actor
- Birthe Kjær (b. 1948), singer
- Wayne Siegel (b. 1953), composer, electronic music educator
- Steffen Brandt (b. 1953), singer, composer and musician
- Anne Linnet (b. 1953), singer and composer
- Finn Nygaard (b. 1955), graphic designer and artist
- Lis Sørensen (b. 1955), singer, guitarist
- Poul Krebs (b. 1956), singer-songwriter, guitarist and composer
- Anne Dorte Michelsen (b. 1958), singer and composer
- Kaare Norge (b. 1963), classical guitarist
- Thomas Helmig (b. 1964), singer
- Mek Pek (b. 1964), singer and actor
- Renée Simonsen (b. 1965), supermodel and author
- Ida Corr (b. 1977), singer
- Tina Dico (b. 1977), pop singer and guitarist
- Liam O'Connor (L.O.C.) (b. 1979), rapper, songwriter and TV-host
- Marwan (b. 1980), rapper and producer
- Medina (b. 1982), pop singer
- Armen Adamjan (b. 1989), YouTuber
- Mona Tougaard (b. 2002), Danish fashion model with Ethiopian, Somali, and Turkish ancestry

Literature

- Erik Pontoppidan (1698–1764) an author, a Lutheran bishop of the Church of Norway, a historian and an antiquarian.
- Thorkild Bjørnvig (1918–2004), writer
- Bent Faurby (b. 1937), children's writer
- Jørgen Leth (1937–2025), poet, director, author and journalist
- Svend Åge Madsen (b. 1939), writer and playwright
- Peter Laugesen (b. 1942), poet and playwright
- Elsebeth Egholm (b. 1960), crime fiction writer
- Lene Kaaberbøl (b. 1960), writer (crime fiction and children's literature)
- Yahya Hassan (1995-2020), poet and activist

Religion and spirituality

- Peder Vognsen (d. 1204), first bishop of Aarhus
- Frederik Paludan-Müller (1809–1876) a Danish poet and bishop of Aarhus, 1830 to 1845.
- Kjeld Christian Festersen Holm (b. 1945), Bishop of Aarhus 1994–2015
- Lars Muhl (b. 1950), mystic, author and musician

== Notes and references ==
Publications

- Oxford, University of (2001). The New Grove Dictionary of Music and Musicians. Oxford University Press. ISBN 0-333-60800-3.
- Mørch, Karin (2008). Gabriels gæstebud (in Danish). Gyldendal. ISBN 978-87-02-06775-0.
