= Frode =

Frode is a Norwegian and Danish masculine given name. It is also used as a surname. The name is a derivative of the Old Norse word Fróði meaning wise. It was very common in Denmark in the pre-World War II period and in Norway during the 1970s.

Notable people with the name include:

== Given name ==
=== A–H ===
- Frode Alfheim (born 1967), Norwegian trade unionist
- Frode Alnæs (born 1959), Norwegian musician
- Frode Andresen (born 1973), Norwegian biathlete
- Frode Barth (born 1968), Norwegian musician
- Frode Berg (born 1971), Norwegian musician
- Frode Berge (born 1966), Norwegian politician
- Frode Birkeland (born 1972), Norwegian football player and coach
- Frode Bjerkholt (1894–1974), Norwegian football player
- Frode Alfson Bjørdal (born 1960), Norwegian academic
- Frode Bovim (born 1977), Norwegian sailor
- Frode Elsness (born 1973), Norwegian chess player
- Frode Estil (born 1972), Norwegian cross-country skier
- Frode Fjellheim (born 1959), Norwegian yoiker and musician
- Frode Gjerstad (born 1948), Norwegian musician
- Frode Glesnes (born 1974), Norwegian musician
- Frode Granhus (1965–2017), Norwegian author
- Frode Grodås (born 1964), Norwegian football player and coach
- Frode Grytten (born 1960), Norwegian writer and journalist
- Frode Hagen (born 1974), Norwegian handball player
- Frode Haltli (born 1975), Norwegian accordion player
- Frode Hansen, multiple people
- Frode Håre (born 1972), Norwegian ski jumper
- Frode Helgerud (born 1950), Norwegian businessperson and politician

=== J–Z ===
- Frode Jacobsen (born 1974), Norwegian musician
- Frode Jacobsen (politician) (born 1968), Norwegian politician
- Frode Jakobsen (1906–1997), Danish writer and politician
- Frode Johnsen (born 1974), Norwegian football player
- Frode Kippe (born 1978), Norwegian football player
- Frode Kirkebjerg (1888–1975), Danish equestrian
- Frode Kjekstad (born 1974), Norwegian musician
- Frode Kristoffersen (1931–2016), Danish journalist and politician
- Frode Kyvåg (born 1945), Norwegian handball coach and sports official
- Frode Lafton (born 1976), Norwegian football player
- Frode Lillefjell (born 1968), Norwegian cross-country skier and coach
- Frode Løberg (born 23 January 1963), Norwegian biathlete
- Frode Moen (born 1969), Norwegian Nordic combined skier.
- Frode Nilsen (1923–2016), Norwegian diplomat
- Frode Nymo (born 1975), Norwegian musician
- Frode Olsen (born 1967), Norwegian football player
- Frode Onarheim (1900–1985), Norwegian military officer and businessperson
- Frode Øverli (born 1968), Norwegian cartoonist
- Frode Rinnan (1905–1997), Norwegian architect and politician
- Frode Saugestad (born 1974), Norwegian literary scholar
- Frode Scheie (born 1967), Norwegian handball player and coach
- Frode Søby (born 1935), Danish chess player
- Frode Sørensen, multiple people
- Frode Syvertsen (born 1963), Norwegian speed skater
- Frode Thingnæs (1940–2012), Norwegian musician
- Frode Thomassen (born 1967), Norwegian football player
- Frode Urkedal (born 1993), Norwegian chess player

=== Middle name ===
- Hans Frode Asmyhr (born 1970), Norwegian lawyer and politician
- Hein Frode Hansen (born 1972), Norwegian musician
- Jan Frode Andersen (born 1972), Norwegian tennis player
- Leif Frode Onarheim (1934–2021), Norwegian businessperson and politician
- Stig Frode Henriksen (born 1975), Norwegian actor

== Surname ==
- Cecilia Frode (born 1970), Swedish actress
- Lukas Fröde (born 1995), German football player
