= Aarhus Runestones =

Runestones in Aarhus, Denmark

Coordinates: 56°5′19″N 10°13′38″E

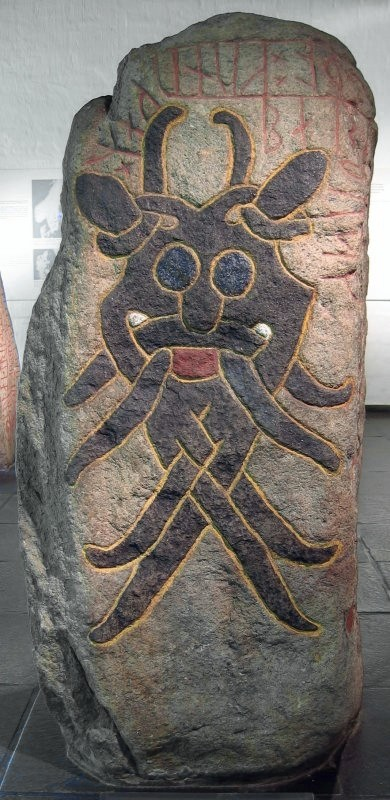
The Aarhus Stone, also known as the Mask Stone

The Aarhus Runestones or Ålum Runestones are six Viking Age runestones which were discovered in and around the city of Aarhus, Denmark. The stones are officially titled Aarhus 1 through 6 and they are all memorial stones created in memory or honor of a person. All six stones are kept and displayed at Moesgård Museum and one of the stones is known as the Aarhus Stone or Mask Stone and features the carving of a mask which has become the official symbol of Moesgård Museum.

== DR 63 ==
DR 63 also known as Aarhus Stone 1 is from c. 970–1020 and has been known since Ole Worm's time in Aarhus when it was used as building material in a wall of the cloister connecting the Church of Our Lady to the priory. Traces of mortar and the carving of the stone suggests it has been used in other structures prior to being placed in the Church of Our Lady. At some point it disappeared from the church but was found in the harbor bulwark in 1866. The stone is of granite and measures 65 cm × 87 cm × 42 cm (26 in × 34 in × 17 in) although it has been cut to fit as construction material resulting in the upper and lower parts of the inscription missing. The inscribed runes are 11.5 cm × 18.7 cm (4.5 in × 7.4 in).

Inscription
Transcription	... Þæxla ... ... þannsi ... ... Ámunda ... ?[e]s ?va[rð] ?[d]ǿ[ðr] [a]t Héðabý ...
Danish translation	[...] NN Thexle ...denne (sten) ... Åmunde ... ?som ?døde ?ved *Hedeby ...
English translation	... NN Þegsla/(the) Adze ... this ... Ámundi ... ?who ?died ?near Hedeby ...

- Thexle is a type of axe, here used as an epithet.

== DR 65 ==
DR 65 also known as Aarhus Stone 2, Aarhus 3 or Aarhus IV, is dated to c. 970–1020. It was found as part of a staircase during a renovation of Aarhus Cathedral School in 1847. The stone has been carved a number of times suggesting it has been used a building material on more than one occasion. The stone is of granite and measures 100 cm × 48 cm × 42 cm (39 in × 19 in × 17 in) although it has been cut to fit as construction material resulting in the upper and right side resulting in parts of the inscription missing. The inscribed runes are 14.5 cm × 16.5 cm (5.7 in × 6.5 in).

Inscription
Transcription	Ásgæiʀʀ/Ásgæiʀ Biarn[aʀ] ... s[t]æinaʀ þá[si] ...
Danish translation	[...] Asger Bjørns ?[søn] ... disse stene ...
English translation	Ásgeirr ?son of Biorn ... these stones ...

- It is uncertain if the stone was made by Bjørn, son of Asger, or if it was made in his memory.

== DR 66 ==
DR 66, also known as Aarhus Stone 3, Aarhus 4 or Aarhus II, is dated to c. 970–1020. It was found in 1850 in the foundation of a water mill that had burned down where it had been used as a cornerstone. The stone is of granite and measures 160 cm (63 in) in height by 47–70 cm (19–28 in) in depth. Width varies on the four sides; side A is 58 cm (23 in); side B is 47 cm (19 in); side C is 70 cm (28 in); and the back side is 75 cm (30 in). The inscribed runes are 13 cm × 18.3 cm (5.1 in × 7.2 in). The stone contains an inscription and the carving of a 110 cm-tall (43 in) mask in mammen style. The inscription is placed on two of the sides and above the mask. The front of the stone is somewhat weathered making some of the inscription unclear.

Inscription
Transcription	Gunnulfʀ ok Ǿgotr/Ǿðgotr ok Áslákʀ ok Rólfʀ résþu stén þannsi æftiʀ Fúl, félaga sinn, eʀ varð ... dǿðr, þá kunungaʀ barðusk.
Danish translation	Gunulv og Øgot og Aslak og Rolf rejste denne sten efter deres fælle Ful. Han fandt døden ... da konger kæmpede.
English translation	Gunnulfr and Eygautr/Auðgautr and Áslakr and Hrólfr raised this stone in memory of Fúl, their partner, who died when kings fought.

- It is possible that "when kings fought" refers to the Battle of Svolder

== DR 67 ==
DR 67, also known as Aarhus Stone 4, also known as Aarhus III or Aarhus 5, is dated to c. 970–1020. It was found in 1866 in the foundation of the Church of Our Lady in Aarhus. The stone is of granite and measures 196 cm (77 in) in height by 72 cm (28 in) in width and 53 cm (21 in) in depth. Width varies on the four sides; side A is 58 cm (23 in); side B is 47 cm (19 in); side C is 70 cm (28 in); and the back side is 75 cm (30 in). The inscribed runes are 17 cm (6.7 in) tall and are inscribed on the widest side.

Inscription
Transcription	Kætill résþi stén þannsi øftiʀ Inga, faður sinn.
Danish translation	Ketil rejste denne sten efter sin fader Inge.
English translation	Ketill raised this stone in memory of Ingi, his father.

== DR 68 ==
DR 68, also known as Aarhus Stone 5, Aarhus 6 and Aarhus V, is from c. 970–1020 and was found in the foundation of the Church of Our Lady in Aarhus during a restoration in 1905. The stone has an inscription with ornamental spirals finishing the bottom lines on both sides combined with vegetative curls on the b side. The stone is of granite and measures 157 cm (62 in) by 55–67 cm (22–26 in) and the inscribed runes are 9.8–14.5 cm (3.9–5.7 in) tall.

Inscription
Transcription	[T]ósti ok Hófi ok þéʀ Frøbiorn résþu stén þannsi æftiʀ Assur Saksa, félaga sinn, harða góðan dræng. Sáʀ dó manna mæst[r] úníðingʀ, sáʀ átti skip með Arna.
Danish translation	Toste og Hove rejste sammen med Frebjørn denne sten efter Asser Sakse, deres fælle, en meget god dreng. Han døde som den største unidding blandt mænd. Han ejede skib sammen med Arne.
English translation	Tosti and Hofi and Freybjǫrn, they raised this stone in memory of Ǫzurr Saxon / Sword(-wielder), their partner, a very good boy. He died as the most unvillainous of men; he owned a ship with Arni.

- The inscription is finished with a small cross.

== Aarhus Stone 6 ==
Aarhus Stone 6, also known as Aarhus 6 and Aarhus V, is from c. 970–1020 and was found under the foundation of the Church of Our Lady in Aarhus during a restoration in 1958. The stone has an inscription which is too fragmented to be deciphered. The stone is of granite and measures 19–26 cm (7.5–10.2 in) by 14–20 cm (5.5–7.9 in) by 3.5–7 cm (1.4–2.8 in). and the inscribed runes are 10–14 cm (3.9–5.5 in) tall.

Inscription
Transcription	...
Danish translation	...
English translation	...
