= Christian (bishop of Aarhus) =

Danish bishop

Christian was a bishop of the Diocese of Aarhus, Denmark, from c. 1060. Christian was the second bishop of the Ancient See of Aarhus and the first after almost a century of vacancy in the diocese. Christian is remembered for participating in one of the last viking raids on England in 1070. The dates of his birth and death are unknown, however it is assumed that he died sometime before 1102, when Ulfketil succeeded him as Bishop of Aarhus.

In 948 Archbishop Adaldag of Hamburg consecrated Reginbrand as missionary Bishop of Aarhus. Jutland was consolidated into a single diocese after Reginbrand's death in 988, with Viborg or Ribe as its centre. The diocese, then a suffragan of Hamburg-Bremen, was redivided in 1060, and Christian was ordained by Adalbert I, Archbishop of Hamburg. In 1104 the diocese became a suffragan of the then newly elevated Archdiocese of Lund. In 1070 Christian participated in one of the last viking raids to England. When Christian returned he started construction of a travertine cathedral on the spot where the Church of Our Lady is located today. The crypt of the original church built by Christian still exists beneath the Church of Our Lady.

Catholic Church titles
Preceded by Vacant	Bishop of Aarhus c. 1060–??	Succeeded by Ulfketil
