= Our Lady's Priory, Aarhus =

Early Dominican foundation just outside the original walls of Aarhus, Denmark

Coordinates: 56°09′30″N 10°12′18″E

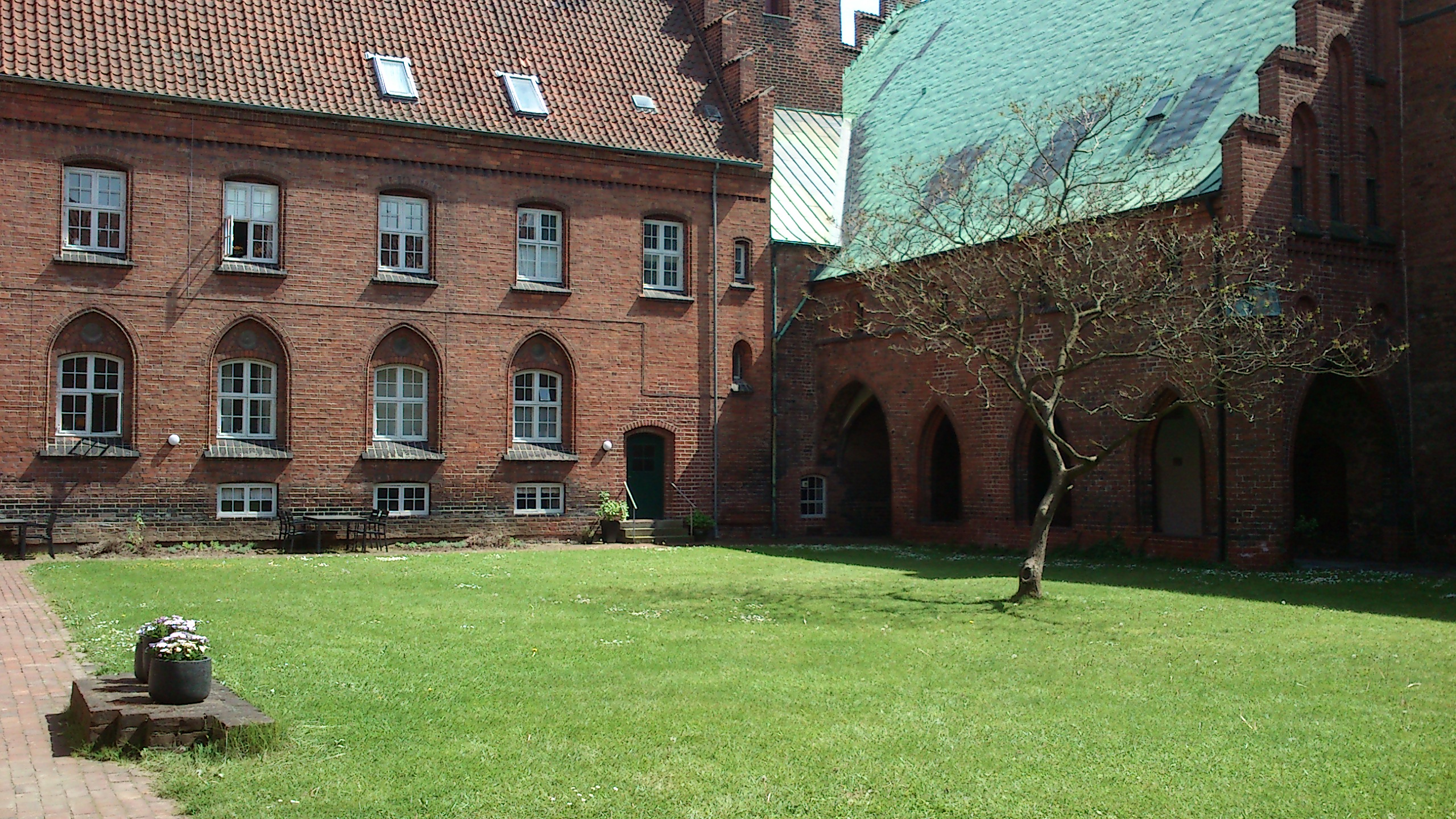
View from the priory atrium garden

Our Lady's Priory, Aarhus (Danish: Vor Frue Kloster) was an early Dominican foundation just outside the original walls of Aarhus, Denmark. The buildings are part of the Church of Our Lady (Vor Frue Kirke) complex, now part of the inner city of Aarhus, but they have been repurposed.

== Early history ==
The exact date of the founding of Our Lady's Priory is unknown. Estimate the time have been between 1221 and 1246. Certainly by 1240 a Dominican priory was established just outside the walls of Aarhus, Jutland's largest town. The recently rediscovered crypt church beneath the choir of Vor Frue Kirke is perhaps the oldest surviving stone church in Scandinavia, dating from the reign of King Sven Estridsen (c. 1019–1076).

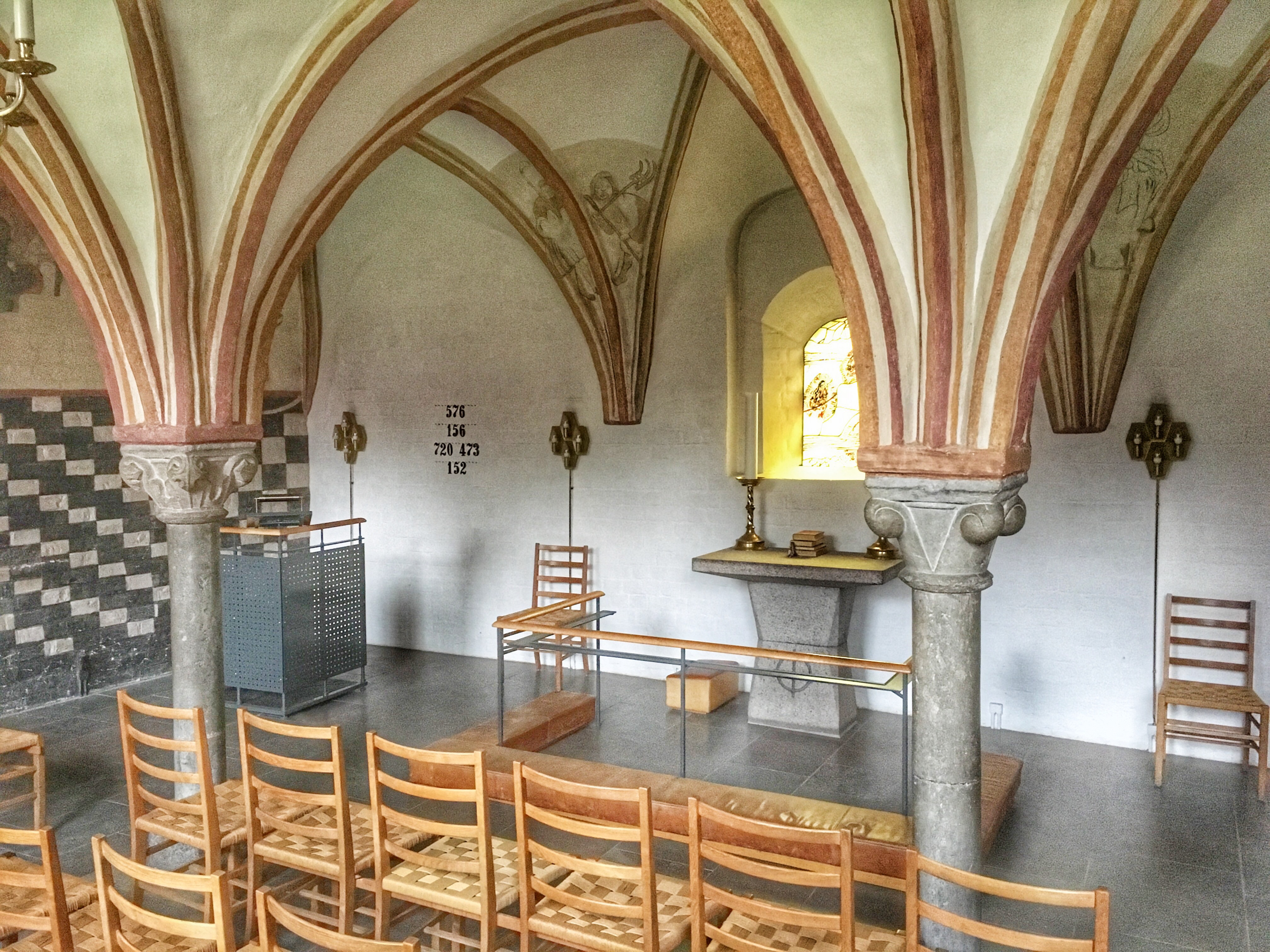
The priory church

The placement of the priory was in conjunction with the still-extant Church of Our Lady (Vor Frue Kirke) which had been built in 1080 on the site of the chapel of St Nicholas' Spring, and served as the cathedral church in Aarhus from 1180. The earlier chapel had been constructed in about 1060 when Bishop Christian arrived to organize the Diocese of Aarhus.When Aarhus Cathedral was built, the Dominicans were given the use of the old church, to which they added a new choir and sacristy; by 1250 it had become the south range of the priory. The church's Gothic nave was added in 1350 and a side aisle in 1450. The tower was added in 1500. A new altar piece was carved by Claus Berg about 1530 and may still be seen in the church today.

== Reformation in Denmark ==
By the time of the Reformation the four-storey priory complex had grown extensively. Denmark became officially Lutheran in 1536 with the enthusiastic support of Christian III. All religious houses and their properties became crown property. The monks were expelled from the priory and either became local residents or travelled south into countries where monks could continue their way of life. The premises stood vacant for a time until Christian III directed that the church should be administered separately from the priory, and ordered the rest of the buildings to be converted into a "common hospital for the sick and the poor" in 1541. Vor Frue Kirke became a parish church, which it remains.

The buildings of the priory thus became a public hospital and a poor house, beginning a use as accommodation for the vulnerable and needy that continues into modern times. In 1888 the priory's former old chapter hall was turned into a chapel for the residents of the priory buildings, which had been turned into apartments for the elderly.

In the years after World War II it was decided to restore the Vor Frue Kirke and the comprehensive work was completed in the 1950s. During the course of the restoration the crypt church was rediscovered after centuries of oblivion. The medieval crucifix, thought to have been carved in 1400, which had survived the Reformation was rehung.

== Sources ==
- Zwergius, Ole, nd. Århus Vor Frue Kloster 1239-1541. (in Danish)
- "Church and Priory of Our Lady". danmarkshistorien.dk. Aarhus University. 24 May 2017.
