= Diocese of Aarhus =

Coordinates: 56.15°N 10.20°E

Diocese of Aarhus Århus Stift
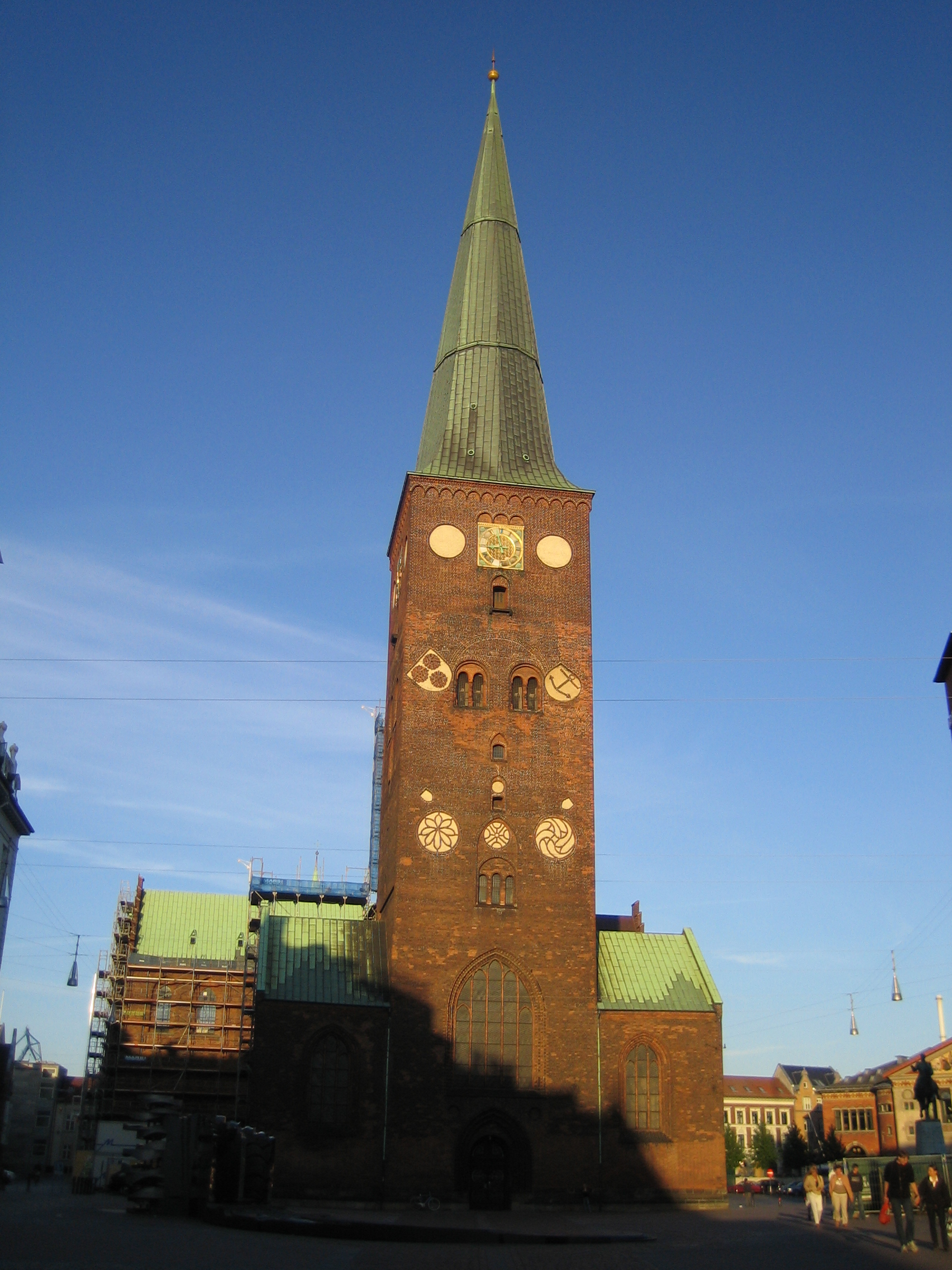
- The Cathedral of the diocese.

Location
- Country: Denmark

Statistics
- Population: Total: (as of 2016); 837,824
- Members: 657,439 (78.5%)

Information
- Denomination: Church of Denmark
- Cathedral: Saint Clement Cathedral of Aarhus

Current leadership
- Bishop: Henrik Wigh-Poulsen

The Diocese of Aarhus (Danish: Århus Stift) is one of 10 dioceses in the Church of Denmark, with headquarters in the city of Aarhus. The diocese covers a large district of northeast Jutland and comprises 14 deaneries, of which four cover the extent of Aarhus city itself.

== History ==
The diocese dates back to 948, when Adam of Bremen noted that Reginbrand, bishop of Aarhus, attended the synod of Ingelheim in Germany. It is not known if the diocese was established earlier or to what extent it functioned in Aarhus. Christianity still only enjoyed a tentative position in Denmark at the time and it is likely the diocese was created in part for missionary purposes and in part to demonstrate for the pope that the Archbishopric of Bremen was successfully converting the peoples in Scandinavia. In 988 Reginbrand died and the diocese was abolished when all dioceses in Jutland were merged to one unit with Viborg or Ribe at its center. The diocese, then a suffragan of Hamburg-Bremen, was redivided in 1060, and Christian was ordained by Adalbert I, Archbishop of Hamburg. In 1104 the diocese became a suffragan of the then newly elevated Archdiocese of Lund.

In 1537 Denmark and Norway went through a Protestant reform resulting in the arrest of catholic bishops and their replacement by Lutheran clerics. In Aarhus Mads Lang was appointed bishop in 1537. Officially the row of bishops continued from the original Catholic See. The last Catholic bishop, Ove Bille resisted the Reformation, aided by Poul Helgesen, prior of the Carmelite monastery at Elsinore. Ove Bille was imprisoned for this in 1536.

== Churches ==
In c. 900 Frode, King of Jutland, built the Holy Trinity Church, a small wooden church situated outside the city walls of the viking settlement. In c. 1070 Bishop Christian started construction of the travertine St. Nicolai Cathedral on the site of the Holy Trinity Church. Aarhus was still predominantly pagan and at the center of the settlement within the wall lay a pagan burial site. In 1102 Bishop Ulfketil built a wooden chapel to contain the relics of Saint Clement. The St. Clement Chapel may have been the first Christian structure to be built centrally in Aarhus, within the walls and on the former pagan burial site. In c. 1180 Niels of Aarhus, illegitimate son of King Canute V of Denmark, died and was buried in the St. Clement Chapel. Niels' death was followed by stories of supernatural events and healing powers at his grave, followed by significant offerings and worship at his tomb. The worship of Niels was seen as a potential challenge to the Danish royal line of succession and Bishop Svend seemed unable or unwilling to stop it, even going as far as trying to have Niels sanctified.

In 1191 the king appointed Peder Vognsen as the new bishop of Aarhus and he quickly moved to stop the unauthorized worship. In 1201 he began construction of the Saint Clement Cathedral to replace the St. Clement chapel and eradicate Niels' grave and any worship of it. The cathedral was finished in c. 1263 but that did not stop the worship of Niels. The St. Nicolai Church was named for St. Nicolai of Myra but Niels in Latin is also Nicolai. This resulted in worship of Niels simply moving to the St. Nicolai Church. In c. 1240 the Peder Vognsen gifted the Nicolai Church to the Dominican Order which subsequently turned it into a monastery and over time completely transformed the building into the Church of Our Lady.

In 1330 the greater part of Aarhus Cathedral burnt down. Peder Jensen Lodehat (1386-1395) and Bo Mogensen (1395-1423) were the prelates mainly concerned in the erection of the present building.

== Religious life in the diocese ==
There were in the diocese, at different times, a chapter with 34 prebendaries at Aarhus cathedral; Benedictines at Esbenbeek, Voer, Alling, and Veierlov; Augustinian Canons at Tvilum, Cistercians at Øm, who survived till 1560; and Carthusians at Aarhus. There were also Franciscans at Horsens and Randers, Dominicans at Aarhus, Horsens, and Randers, Carmelites and a hospital of the Holy Spirit at Aarhus. There were Hospitallers of St. John till 1568 at Horsens. Lastly there were Brigittines at Mariager from 1412 to 1592.

== See also ==
- List of Churches in Aarhus
- List of Bishops of Aarhus
