= Tyge (bishop) =

Danish bishop (died 1272)

- Died: 23 November 1272; Samsø, Denmark

Tyge or Tuke or Tycho (d. 23 November 1272 on Samsø) was bishop of the Diocese of Aarhus in Aarhus, Denmark. Tyge completed studies in Paris where he obtained a magister degree. Tyge became bishop of Aarhus with the support of Pope Urban IV and was involved in the ouster of Jacob Erlandsen, Archbishop of the Diocese of Lund. Bishop Tyge was known as a staunch supporter of the Danish kings and was for a period the de facto head of church in Denmark. Tyge died on Samsø on 23 November 1273. His successor was the former arch deacon Peder Aaby who had been Tyge's and king Eric V'a trusted supporter during the conflict with the church.

== Bishop ==
In 1260 there were elections in the diocese of Aarhus for bishop and Tyge received several votes although not enough to secure victory. Tyge traveled to the Pope in Rome to have the matter resolved but in the meantime the Archbishop of the Diocese of Lund Jacob Erlandsen appointed abbot Arnfast of Ryd Abbey bishop of Aarhus. Arnfast was by some suspected of having killed king Christoffer I in 1259 so it may have been a contentious decision. In Rome Tyge successfully gained the support of Pope Pope Urban IV who reprimanded Jacob Erlandsen and made Tyge bishop. In addition Tyge won the support of the pope for the candidate of the Danish state for archbishop in the Diocese of Lund. In 1262 Tyge returned to Denmark with rare relics and was quickly seen as the preeminent cleric in the diocese.

Tyge had the papal nuntius magister Gerhard banish Jacob Erlandsen and Urban IV indicted Erlandsen in the papal courts with severe accusations resulting in Jacob Erlandsen and his supporters being forced to leave the country. In addition Tyge was entrusted with a number of positions. In 1263 he was tasked with designing a convent Princess Agnes was establishing, even though the convent was in Zealand. In the same year he was made responsible for collecting funds in Denmark for the crusades. In 1264 he was put in charge of the Diocese of Roskilde when bishop Peder Bang was exiled.

== Øm Abbey ==
Pope Urban IV supported bishop Tyge in a dispute against the Cistercian Øm Abbey. One day Tyge visited the abbey but was refused entry. Tyge demanded the hospitality commonly afforded travelers but this was also refused. Tyge then forced his way into the "bishop's house" in the abbey and monks started ringing the bells in the abbey as a warning. Tyge felt threatened and fled the abbey in anger. In subsequent court meetings Bishop Tyge accused Bo, the abbot of Øm Abbey, of hiding Arnfast and other enemies of the king. Abbot Bo responded by cursing anyone who would lie in such matters. Tyge then banished Abbot Bo and all his supporters on the spot to which Bo responded by releasing himself and his supporters from the banishment. Bishop Tyge proceeded to harass peasants in the abbey and ignored Cistercian complaints to the pope. In 1267 Abbot Bo resigned his position but bishop Tyge was uncompromising towards the new abbot, Thure.

Pope Urban IV eventually reproved Tyge for his acts of violence and appointed impartial judges to solve the matter. The bishops of the Diocese of Ribe and the Diocese of Schleswig in 1264 mediated a compromise that meant the abbey was obligated to host bishops as guests in exchange for Tyge relinquishing a number of other demands. Tyge subsequently abused his right and forced the abbey to host him and retinue far beyond normal. The conflict started up again, Tyge started harassing the peasants in the abbey again.

When Pope Urban IV died Bishop Tyge lost a valuable ally, The cardinal Guido was made papal legate to Denmark and in 1266-67 he banished Tyge. In 1267 he was also banished by the Bishop of Schleswig for his actions against Øm Abbey and for not showing up in court. However, the banishings didn't change anything – Tyge remained in power, Øm Abbey was economically broken and Jacob Erlandsen was still in exile. In 1268 Abbot Thure resigned as abbot and the remaining monks acquiesced to the demands of Bishop Tyge.

== See also ==
- List of Bishops of Aarhus

Catholic Church titles
Preceded by Peder Ugotsøn	Bishop of Aarhus; 1261–1272	Succeeded by Peder IV
