= Peder Jensen Lodehat =

Danish bishop

The Right Reverend Peder Jensen Lodehat
- Bishop of Aarhus
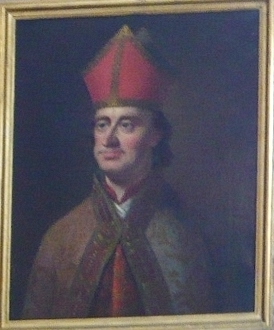
- Church: Roman Catholic
- Diocese: Aarhus
- Appointed: 1387
- Term ended: 1395
- Predecessor: Olufsen
- Successor: Bo Mogensen

Personal details
- Died: 21 October 1416; Roskilde, Denmark

Peder Jensen Lodehat (died 21 October 1416) was the bishop of the Diocese of Aarhus and a significant political figure in Denmark during the reign of Queen Margrete I. Lodehat was originally from a minor noble family in Zealand but made a career in the Catholic Church as bishop of a total of 3 dioceses. He served on the Danish Riksråd and had a role in getting Margrethe I appointed queen. Lodehat also had a central role in the creation of the Kalmar Union and may have authored the founding documents. The surname Lodehat stems from a type of hat, Lodehat, featured on the family coat of arms but although the family has become known under this name they likely didn't use it in their own time.

In 1382 he was appointed bishop of the Diocese of Växjö, in what is today Sweden. In 1386 he became bishop of the Diocese of Aarhus and was appointed to the Riksråd. In his new position he advocated strongly to have queen Margrethe I appointed the fuldmægtige formynder (all-powerful protector) of the realm. In 1395 he became bishop of the Diocese of Roskilde, the largest and most prestigious diocese in Denmark at the time. Lodehat participated in most meetings related to the Kalmar Union and in 1397 he sealed the founding Kalmarunionsbrevet (Letter of the Kalmar Union). When Margrethe I died Lodehat had her body moved to Roskilde Cathedral. In his last years he supported King Eric of Pomerania's policies towards Schleswig.

Lodehat became known for building large altars in his cathedrals. In 1400 he started construction of Gjorslev Castle.

== See also ==
- List of bishops of Aarhus

Catholic Church titles
Preceded by Olufsen	Bishop of Aarhus; 1387–1395	Succeeded by Bo Mogensen
