= Jens Paludan-Müller =

Danish bishop (1771–1845)

The Right Reverend Jens Paludan-Müller
- Bishop of Aarhus
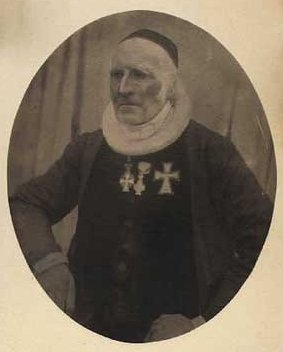
- Jens Paludan-Müller
- Church: Church of Denmark
- Diocese: Aarhus
- In office: 1830-1845
- Predecessor: Peter Hans Mønster
- Successor: Gerhard Peter Brammer

Personal details
- Born: 7 November 1771 Sorø, Denmark
- Died: 14 May 1845 (aged 74) Aarhus, Denmark
- Spouse: Benedicte Rosenstand-Goiske
- Children: 3

Jens Paludan-Müller (7 November 1771 – 14 May 1845) was a Danish bishop, teacher and author. He served as the bishop of the Diocese of Aarhus between 1830 and 1845 and published a collection of his sermons. In 1799, he married Benedicte Rosenstand-Goiske (1775–1820), the daughter of the priest in Gunslev, Jens Rosenstand-Goiske. The couple had 9 children including the historian Caspar Paludan-Müller, the poet Frederik Paludan-Müller and the deacon Jens Paludan-Müller.

He was the son of the principal of Sorø Academy's estate Caspar Peter Müller (d. 1776) and Anna Paludan (d. 1805). His father died when he was 4 years old but his mother's guardian Laurits Laurberg Kongslev took care of Paludan-Müller and had him taught along with his own children. He moved to Copenhagen with his mother and graduated primary school in 1789. In 1789, he obtained a degree in theology and was hired as a teacher at the school Det Kongelige Vajsenhus in Copenhagen. In 1799, he became a parish priest for Thise Parish in Viborg Diocese and in 1801 he was moved to Kerteminde to serve as the priest of Drigstrup Parish. In Kerteminde, he reformed the dilapidated school and social systems in his lengthy tenure there.

In 1819, he was made archdeacon at St. Canute's Cathedral in Odense. In Odense, between 1821 and 1825, he published 3 collections of sermons which he called Bidrag til Husandagt. The purpose of the sermons was to give people who didn't attend church the opportunity to study Christianity and work with their faith at home. In 1826 the millennial anniversary of Christianity in Denmark was celebrated and Paludan-Müller was invited to defend his PhD in Theology again, although he turned down the offer. In 1830, he was made bishop of Aarhus. Jens Paludan-Müller primarily became known through his theological musings and philosophical observations with much in common with Friedrich Schleiermacher. His letters and publications are well regarded to this day.

Paludan-Müller was awarded the Knight of the Order of the Dannebrog in 1813, was given the honorary emblem in 1828 and in 1836 he was made a commander of the Order of the Dannebrog.

The road of Paludan-Müllers Vej in central Aarhus is named in his honor.
