= Skjalm Vognsen =

Danish bishop (died 1215)

Skjalm Vognsen (died 1215) was the bishop of the Diocese of Aarhus from 1204 until his death in 1215. He was the brother of his predecessor Peder Vognsen.

Skjalm Vognsen was first a canon at Lund Cathedral under Bishop Absalon until he became archdeacon in Aarhus Cathedral under his brother. In 1204, Peder Vognsen died and Skjalm succeeded him as bishop. Through large gifts of land he secured Aarhus Cathedral greater revenue and expanded it with more prebends. With support from Pope Innocent III and king Valdemar Sejr he continued the construction of Aarhus Cathedral although it was not finished within his lifetime. Skjalm Vognsen died in 1215 and was buried next to Absalon in Sorø Convent Church.

Catholic Church titles
Preceded by Peder Vognsen	Bishop of Aarhus; 1204–1215	Succeeded by Ebbe Vognsen
