= Heinrich Ernst Grosmann =

Danish composer

Heinrich Ernst Grosmann (1732–1811) was a Danish composer. He is best known for his work with Aarhus Cathedral.

Notable works include Paaske Music (1775) and Cantata Paa Christi Himmelfarts Dag. Gud farer op (1791)

== See also ==
- List of Danish composers
