= Frode Sørensen =

Frode Sørensen may refer to:

- Frode Sørensen (politician) (born 1946), Danish politician
- Frode Sørensen (cyclist) (1912–1980), Danish cyclist
