= Eskil (bishop of Aarhus) =

Eskil was a bishop of the Ancient See of Aarhus in Aarhus, Denmark, who died around 1165. Eskil is mentioned for the first time in 1158 when king Valdemar I is recorded as giving Vitskøl to the Cistercian order. It is not known when Eskil was born or when he died, only that he died during a raid to Wendland c. 1165. In the church-conflict at the time Eskil, as many other bishops, and king Valdemar was on the side of the imperial pope. However, King Valdemar's policies changed and soon he supported the French side and the archbishop Eskil of Lund which he proved by donating land in the diocese to the Cistercians. The initial offering of Vitskøl proved undesirable and the Cistercians had it swapped for another property at Sminge in 1165. The monks later swapped lands again until finally they had lands at Mossø near Skanderborg, where Øm Abbey would eventually be built. The Cistercian monks brought their relics with them whenever they moved, including the body of Eskil.

Catholic Church titles
| Preceded by Ulfketil | Bishop of Aarhus ???-1157 | Succeeded by Vacant |
