= Henrik Wigh-Poulsen =

Danish theologian (born 1959)

The Right Reverend Henrik Wigh-Poulsen
- Bishop of Aarhus
- Church: Church of Denmark
- Diocese: Aarhus
- Elected: 2015
- Predecessor: Kjeld Holm

Orders
- Consecration: 1 September 2015

Personal details
- Born: 27 April 1959 (age 67) Randers, Denmark
- Denomination: Lutheran
- Children: 3
- Education: Aarhus University

Henrik Wigh-Poulsen (born 27 April 1959 in Randers) is a Danish theologian who since September 2015 has been the Bishop of Aarhus.

== Life ==
- 1979 Community student from Grenå Gymnasium
- 1989 Theological candidate from Aarhus University
- 1989-1997 Vicar og Lejrskov-Jordrup parish in the Diocese of Ribe .
- 1997-1998 High school teacher at Askov High School
- 1999-2000 Copywriter at advertising agency
- 2000 PhD Thesis: Nature and Homecoming - a study of Grundtvig and Jakob Knudsen's realism highlighted by the fundamental devil's relationship with *the realistic literature in the years 1870-1890 (Afhandling: Natur og hjemkomst – en undersøgelse af Grundtvigs og Jakob Knudsens realisme belyst *af den grundtvigske bevægelses forhold til den realistiske litteratur i årene 1870-1890)
- 2000-2008 Editor of Danish Church Press
- 2000-2008 Head of the Grundtvig Academy, Vartov
- 2008-2015 The provost of the Odense Cathedral in the Diocese of Funen
- 2015 till now Bishop of Aarhus
