= Frederik Paludan-Müller =

Danish poet (1809–1876)

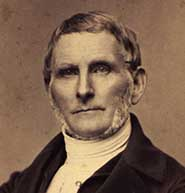

Frederik Paludan-Müller (7 February 1809 – 27 December 1876) was a Danish poet, the third son of Jens Paludan-Müller and born in Kerteminde, on the island of Funen.

In 1819 his father was transferred to Odense, and Frederik began to attend the Latin school there. In 1828 he passed to the University of Copenhagen. The poet lived a very retired life, first in Copenhagen, then for many years in a cottage on the outskirts of the royal park of Fredensborg, and finally in a house in Ny Adelgade, Copenhagen, where he died.

== Work ==
In 1832 he opened his poetical career with Four Romances, and a romantic comedy entitled Love at Court. This enjoyed a considerable success, and was succeeded in 1833 by Dandserinden ("The Dancing Girl").

Paludan-Müller was accepted by criticism without a struggle, and few writers have excited less hostility. He was not, however, well inspired in his lyrical drama of Amor and Psyche in 1834 nor in his oriental tale of Zuleimas Flugt ("Zuleima's Flight"), in 1835, in each of which he was too vividly influenced by Lord Byron. But he regained all that he had lost by his two volumes of poems in 1836 and 1838.

From 1838 to 1840 Paludan-Müller was making the grand tour in Europe and his genius greatly expanded; in Italy he wrote Venus, a lyrical poem of extreme beauty. In the same year, 1841, he began to publish a great work on which he had long been engaged and which he did not conclude until 1848; this was Adam Homo, a narrative epic, satirical, modern and descriptive, into which Paludan-Müller wove all his variegated impressions of Denmark and of love. It deals with the duality of human personality, the emptiness of social ambition, and the redeeming force of selfless love. This remains a classic of Danish poetical literature.

In 1844 he composed three enchanting idylls, Dryadens bryllup ("The Dryad's Wedding") Tithon ("Tithonus") and Abels Død ("The Death of Abel"). From 1850 a certain decline in the poet's physical energy became manifest and he wrote less. His majestic drama of Kalanus belongs to 1854. Then for seven years he kept silent. Paradiset ("Paradise") 1861; and Benedikt fra Nurcia ("Benedict of Nurcia") 1861; bear evidence of malady, both physical and mental. Paludan-Müller wrote considerably after this, but never recovered his early raptures, except in the very latest of all his poems, the enchanting welcome to death, entitled Adonis.

The work of Paludan-Müller, especially Adam Homo in many ways represents the ultimate idealist demands of Danish romanticism. His strong ethic claims and personal isolation has often made him being compared to the philosopher Søren Kierkegaard in spite of their differences. Rather unknown outside Denmark, Paludan-Müller has perhaps however exerted an influence on world literature in that way that the early works of Henrik Ibsen, Brand, Peer Gynt, seem to be influenced by his thoughts.

He died on 27 December 1876 and is buried in Asminderød Cemetery in Fredensborg.

== Translations into English ==
- Adam Homo, The Twickenham Press, tr. Stephen I. Klass, 1980.
