= Frode Hansen =

Frode Hansen may refer to:

- Frode Hansen (editor) (born 1973) newspaper editor
- Frode Eike Hansen (born 1972) former professional Norwegian footballer at Lyn and Viking
- Frode Holstad Hansen (born 1961) former Norway international footballer that played for Fredrikstad FK and Start
