= Church of Our Lady (Aarhus) =

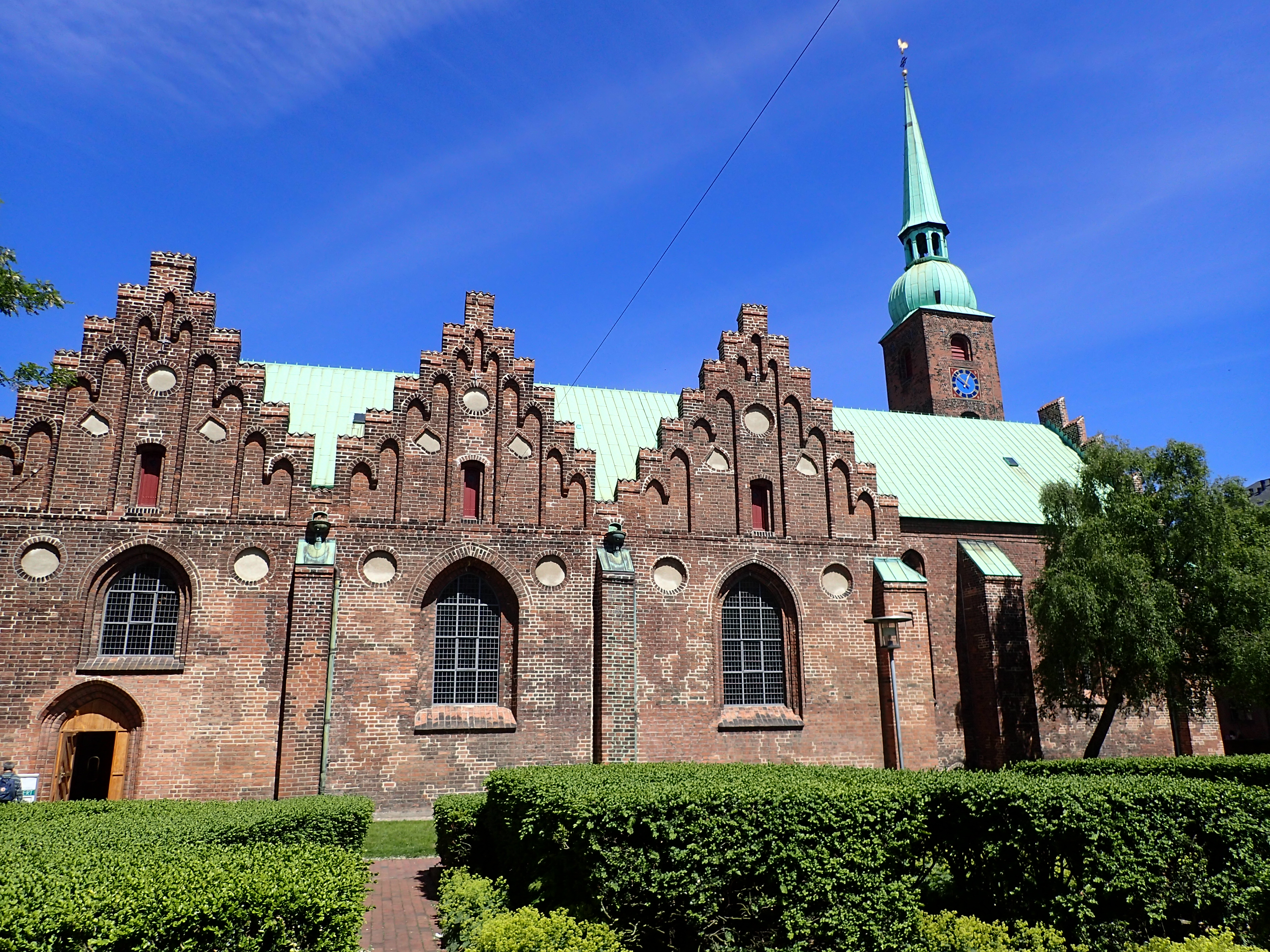
- Church of Our Lady
- 56.158°N 10.205°E
- Location: Vestergade 21; 8000 Aarhus
- Country: Denmark
- Denomination: Church of Denmark
- Previous denomination: Catholic Church

History
- Status: Church

Architecture
- Completed: 1060

Specifications
- Materials: Brick

Administration
- Archdiocese: Diocese of Aarhus

The Church of Our Lady (Danish: Vor Frue Kirke) is one of the larger church structures of Århus, Denmark. It is situated in the centre of the city not far from Aarhus Cathedral (Århus Domkirke). The church and associated structures were built in several stages in the course of the Middle Ages, from the late 1200s to 1500 AD. The original church at the site, stood finished as early as 1060 AD, but only the stone crypt remains today as evidence of its existence.

== History ==
The church was originally known as St. Nicholas' Church but was expanded by the construction of a Dominican priory in 1240, the Vor Frue Kloster (Our Lady's Priory), of which the present church formed the southern wing. After the Reformation in Denmark, the name was changed to the Church of Our Lady and King Christian III decreed that the surrounding buildings, formerly a priory of the Dominicans, should function as a hospital for the sick and poor. The church was subsequently granted congregational privileges which officially made it a centre for clerical activities in its area.

Between 1250 and 1500 the church was heavily expanded by the addition of, among other things, the large tower. In the 1950s a crypt-church was rediscovered beneath the church during renovations. The crypt church dates to approximately 1060 AD. The church has since been renovated again in 2000.

== Crypt church ==
The crypt church beneath the Church of Our Lady

The crypt church is the oldest extant stone church in Scandinavia. Built in 1060 after the old wooden church had been burned in an assault on the town, the church is situated beneath the main building of the Church of Our Lady. After its discovery in the 1950s, it was restored and reopened on 10 November 1957 and is now used for mass once a week.

During the restoration by the Danish National Museum, two graves were found—one of a child and one of an adult—and 23 coins from the 14th century. Five of these coins were from Lübeck and the rest from Hamburg.

The crypt church was initially built as an attempt to weaken Adalbert, archbishop of Hamburg-Bremen, who had considerable influence on Danish clerical matters, as the head of the Danish church. Svend Estridsen (1047–1074) divided Denmark into 8 bishoprics, and in 1060, Christian became the first bishop of Aarhus. The crypt church was built the same year.

Around 1080, a new and larger church was built here, named after Saint Nicholas, just like numerous other Danish churches of the time. In 1180, it was mentioned as Aarhus' first cathedral, but was demolished when the Dominicans came to town.

There is no historic information about the crypt church from the following centuries. At some point the rooms were walled off and used as a storage room, until the church itself was forgotten.

== Priory ==
The exact year for the erection of the Dominican priory is not known. Different sources point both to the years 1227 and 1239; it is generally assumed that the priory was fully established by approximately 1240.

The priory was separated from the Church of Our Lady during the Reformation, when King Christian III (1534–1559) decided that the church should function as a parish church, while the other priory buildings should be used as a hospital and poor house. In 1888 part of the former priory was converted into a chapel for the residents of the building, then as now principally the elderly.

== See also ==
- List of Churches in Aarhus

== Sources ==
- Zwergius, Ole, nd: Århus Vor Frue Kloster 1239-1541. ISBN 87-983814-0-7
- "Church and Priory of Our Lady". danmarkshistorien.dk. Aarhus University. 24 May 2017.
