= Ove Bille =

Danish bishop and royal chancellor (died 1555)

The Right Reverend Ove Bille
- Bishop of Aarhus
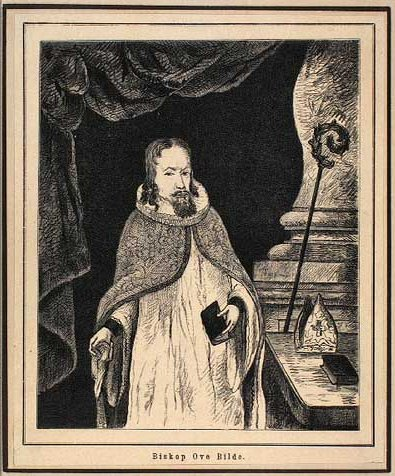
- Ove Bille
- Church: Roman Catholic
- Diocese: Aarhus
- Appointed: 8 August 1520
- Term ended: 1536
- Predecessor: Niels Clausen
- Successor: Mads Lang

Orders
- Consecration: 1520 by Niels Clausen Skade

Personal details
- Died: 10 April 1555 Aarhus, Denmark

Ove Bille (died 10 April 1555) was a Danish bishop and royal chancellor to three Danish kings John, Christian II and Frederick. He served as a chancellor for 21 years and was in 1520 rewarded with the bishopric of the Diocese of Aarhus. He was especially known for effective administration and strong defense of the Catholic Church. Following the Reformation in Denmark in 1536, Bille was treated more leniently than other Catholic bishops and was released already in 1537.

Ove Bille was appointed secretary of the royal chancellery, Copenhagen in 1499 and around 1506 he was appointed chancellor. On his deathbed King John recommended Ove Bille to his son Christian II. By his father recommendation Bille was made Bishop of Aarhus in 1520. In 1523 the nobles in Jutland rebelled and demanded the deposition of king Christian II. Ove Bille remained loyal to king Christian and sought to mediate between the rebels and king. During the reformation in Denmark–Norway and Holstein in 1536 he put up a strong defense in favor of the Catholic Church. When Frederick I died in 1533 he headed the Catholic Party and tried to have the young Duke John II made the new king but after a meeting in Gammel Rye in 1534 with the councils of Jutland he had to accept Christian III instead.

The proclamation of Christian III eventually led to the Count's Feud conflict and the coup d'état in 1536 and the conclusion of the reformation in Denmark. Catholic bishops were subsequently stripped of their titles and the many large lands accumulated by the church was confiscated by the crown. Bishop Bille was also stripped of his title but not immediately jailed. Not until Bille refused to give over Silkeborg Castle to the king was he eventually imprisonment although still quite leniently. First he was jailed in Dragsholm Castle and later Nyborg Castle. In 1537 he was released on condition he would not work against the new social order. He was granted a lien on Skovkloster.

Ove Bille died on 10 April 1555 and was Buried at Antvorskov convent church.

== See also ==
- List of Bishops of Aarhus

Catholic Church titles
Preceded by Niels Clausen	Bishop of Aarhus; 1520–1536	Succeeded by Mads Lang
