= Frode Alfson Bjørdal =

Norwegian philosopher

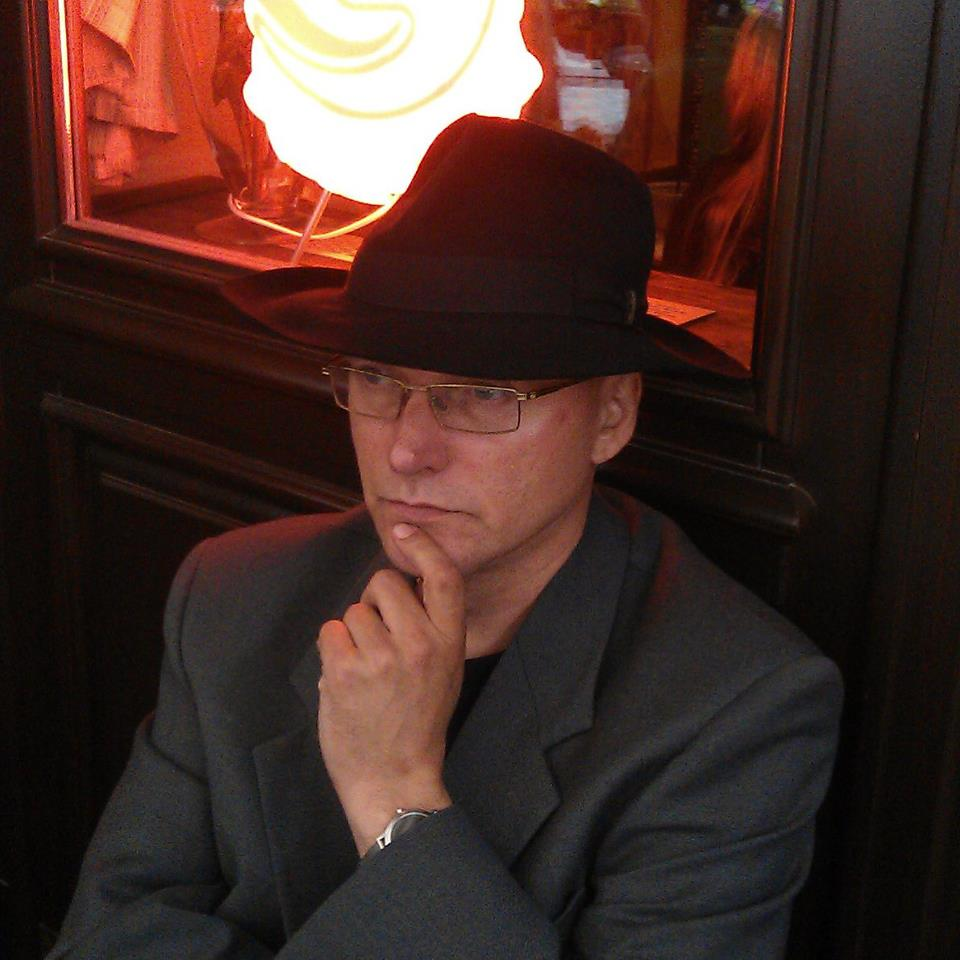
- Born: Frode Bjørdal; January 30, 1960 (age 66)
- Education: University of California, Santa Barbara and University of Bergen
- Occupation: Academic
- Website: www.hf.uio.no/ifikk/personer/vit/filosofi/emeriti/fbjordal/index.html

Frode Alfson Bjørdal is philosophy professor emeritus at the University of Oslo, Norway.

== Education ==
Bjørdal did his undergraduate studies in philosophy, logic, mathematics and economics at the University of Bergen, Norway, and was a DAAD-Stipendiat at the Johan Wolfgang von Goethe Universität in Frankfurt am Main, Germany, in 1985/86. He studied philosophy at University of California, Santa Barbara, United States, from 1988 to 1992, and got his PhD from there in 1993.

== Career ==
From 1992 to 1994 he worked at the University of Trondheim (now Norwegian University of Science and Technology), and from 1994 to 1996 at the University of Tromsø. He worked at the University of Oslo from 1996 to 2013, and is now a professor emeritus there.

== Some philosophical publication areas ==
Bjørdal has published on alternative set theories, semantics for modal logics and on modal ontological arguments in the Gödelian tradition.

== Mathematical genealogy, and mathematical reviews ==
Although a philosopher by training, his work earned him an entry in the Mathematics Genealogy Project. Eight of his publications are reported upon in Mathematical Reviews; he has written thirteen article appraisals there, as per the references.

== Selected works ==
- Understanding Gödel's Ontological Argument, in T. Childers (ed.), The Logica Yearbook 1998, FILOSOFIA, Prague, 1999, 214-217.
- Considerations Contra Cantorianism, in M. Pelis & V. Puncochar (eds), The Logica Yearbook 2010, pp. 43–52, College Publications 2011.
- Librationist Closures of the Paradoxes, in Logic and Logical Philosophy, Vol. 21, No. 4 (2012), 323–361.
- The Evaluation Semantics – A Short Introduction, in M. Pelis & V. Puncochar (eds), The Logica Yearbook 2011, pp. 31–36, College Publications 2012.
- The inadequacy of a proposed paraconsistent set theory, Review of Symbolic Logic 4 (1):106-108, 2011.
- The Isolation of the Definable Real Numbers with Domination and Capture in Librationist Set Theory, lecture at Third St.Petersburg Days of Logic and Computability, Russia, August 24–26, 2015.
- Review of Penelope Rush (ed.), The Metaphysics of Logic, Cambridge University Press, 2014, 267pp., $99.00 (hbk), ISBN 978-1-107-03964-3 in Notre Dame Philosophical Reviews
- Cubes and Hypercubes of Opposition, with Ethical Ruminations on Inviolability, in Logica Universalis Volume 10, Issue 2–3 (2016), pp 373–376.
- Elements of Librationism at arXiv:1407.3877.
- Skolem Satisfied - On £ and ₽. A chapter which The Iranian Association for Logic invited me to write for the book Logic Around the World, Andisheh & Farhang-e Javidan, Iran, ISBN 978-600-6386-99-7, 2017, 31-42.
- All Properties are Divine or God Exists – The Sacred Thesis and its Ontological Argument, in Logic and Logical Philosophy, Vol 27, No 3 (2018), pp. 329–350.
- 14 Reviews for Mathematical Reviews

== Video of invited lecture for Faculty of Arts - Al Mustansiriyah University - Baghdad, Iraq ==
https://www.youtube.com/watch?v=kPDPaQOH884
