= Frode Saugestad =

Norwegian literary scholar

Frode Saugestad (born 2. April 1974 in Namsos) is a Norwegian literary scholar, publisher and adventurer. He lives in London and Cambridge Massachusetts, United States. Previously he was PR/Marketing Manager for Diesel Jeans in Norway, and in 1999 he founded the art gallery NAF (Norwegian Anarchistic Fraction) with Norwegian artist Bjarne Melgaard. In 2004 Saugestad set up L.S.P. publishing house, which specializes in literature from and about the Middle East.

== Academic career ==
Saugestad obtained his undergraduate degree at the University of Oslo in 2002 majoring in History of Ideas, and his M.A. (2003) and Ph.D. (2005) in Comparative Literature from SOAS, University of London. He specializes in the modern novel primarily from the 20th century. Between 2007 and 2010 he was a post-doctoral research fellow at CMES, Harvard University, where he is now a visiting fellow. During spring 2010 he taught a course entitled “The Novel of the Periphery” in the Comparative Literature Department.

In 2009, Saugestad published "Individuation and the Shaping of Personal Identity: A Comparative Study of the Modern Novel" which dealt with the process of individuation and the shaping of identity in the modern novel, analyzing the Norwegian literature through the work of Knut Hamsun, the Irish through the work of James Joyce, the Egyptian through the work of Naguib Mahfouz and the Sudanese through the work of Tayeb Salih.

== Media ==
In June 2009 Saugestad hosted an international conference focusing on the Oslo Accords entitled "What Now for the Middle East: 15 Years after the Oslo Accords". The conference was partly funded by the Norwegian Ministry of Foreign Affairs.

Saugestad has written editorial features for Aftenposten and Dagbladet, in addition to articles for journals such as Vinduet, Babylon and Politiken.

In 2009, Saugestad revealed in interviews in Dagens Næringsliv, Forskerforum, Massiv and D2 that he intended to leave academia to become an adventurer. In May 2010 he skied across the Greenland inland ice.

Saugestad has also been a frequent guest at Trygdekontoret, a talkshow on NRK.
