= Frode Lillefjell =

Norwegian cross-country skier and coach

Personal information
- Nationality: Norway
- Born: December 9, 1968 (age 57)

Sport
- Sport: Skiing
- Club: Henning SL

World Cup career
- Seasons: 1 – (1993)
- Indiv. starts: 1
- Indiv. podiums: 0
- Team starts: 1
- Team podiums: 0
- Overall titles: 0 – (90th in 1993)

Frode Lillefjell (born 9 December 1968) is a former Norwegian cross-country skier and current coach.

He competed in the 1992–93 FIS Cross-Country World Cup. He was also an able long distance runner, with personal best times that include 8:24.28 minutes in the 3000 metres (1993), 14:51.37 minutes in the 5000 metres (1995) and 30.59.06 minutes in the 10,000 metres (1995). He represented the club Henning SL in skiing and Ogndal IL in athletics.

From 2001 to 2008 he was based in Alaska as skiing coach at Alaska Pacific University. He coached Kikkan Randall when she became the US' first female World Cup race winner in December 2007. In 2008 he was hired as a coach of Team Trøndelag, a regional ski team in Trøndelag, Norway. Already in May 2010 he had achieved sufficient success to be given the Cross-Country Coach of the Year Award in Norway.

== Cross-country skiing results ==
All results are sourced from the International Ski Federation (FIS).

=== World Cup ===
==== Season standings ====
Season	Age	Overall
1993	24	90
