= Frode Bjerkholt =

Norwegian footballer (1894-1974)

Personal information
- Date of birth: 10 March 1894
- Place of birth: Larvik, Norway
- Date of death: 25 February 1974 (aged 79)
- Position: Defender

International career
Years	Team	Apps	(Gls)
1913	Norway	1	(0)

Frode Bjerkholt (10 March 1894 – 25 February 1974) was a Norwegian footballer. He played in one match for the Norway national football team in 1913.
