= Aarhus Cathedral =

- St Clement's Church
- Aarhus Domkirke (Danish), Sct. Clemens Kirke (Danish)
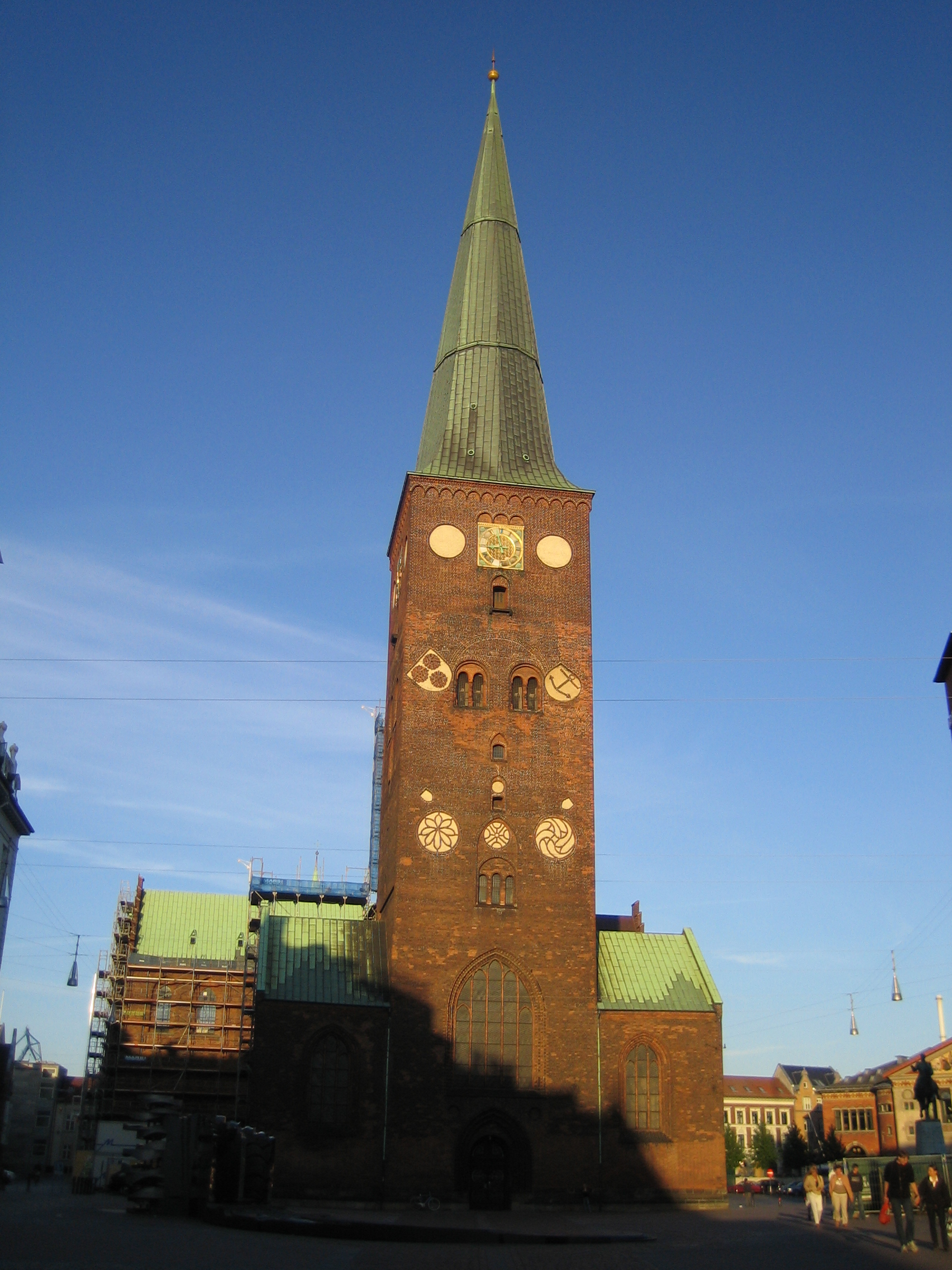
- Aarhus Cathedral, main entrance and tower
- Aarhus Cathedral
- 56°9′25″N 10°12′38″E
- Location: Domkirkepladsen 2; 8000 Aarhus
- Country: Denmark
- Denomination: Church of Denmark
- Previous denomination: Roman Catholic
- Website: Website of the Cathedral

History
- Status: Cathedral
- Dedication: St Clement

Architecture
- Functional status: Active
- Heritage designation: Listed building
- Designated: 01-02-2012
- Architectural type: Basilica
- Style: Gothic
- Years built: 1190–1500
- Completed: 1500

Specifications
- Materials: Brick

Administration
- Diocese: Diocese of Aarhus

Clergy
- Bishop: Henrik Wigh-Poulsen

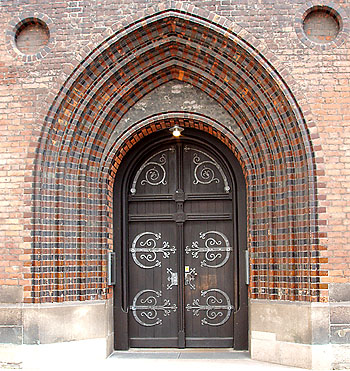
The main door

Aarhus Cathedral (Danish: Århus Domkirke) is a cathedral in Aarhus, Denmark. It is the longest and tallest church in the country, at 93 m (305 ft) in length and 96 m (315 ft) in height.

The construction of Aarhus Cathedral began in the 12th century and it is the main edifice of the diocese of Aarhus for the Church of Denmark, dedicated to the patron saint of sailors, St Clemens. The cathedral is situated on the port side of the central square of Store Torv (Large Square), with address "Domkirkepladsen 2, 8000 Aarhus C, Denmark" in the inner city. The church can seat around 1200 people.

Aarhus Cathedral is a listed building and was designated 1 February 2012.

== History ==
=== The early churches of Aarhus ===
It is unknown exactly when people first settled near the mouth of the Aarhus River on the east coast of Jutland. Certainly in the 700s there was a Viking town there. Recent research has dated the building of the first city wall to 934. Aarhus must have been a town of some importance in the Viking Age, as there are six runestones in or near the city. The name is known as Aros, Arus, Aarhus or Aars, as early as the 15th century. The city's charter of 1449 names it "Aarss". After the Reformation in Denmark, the name "Aarhus" became current.

Aarhus' first church, Holy Trinity Church, a timber structure, was built during the reign of Frode King of Jutland around year 900 on top of the city's pagan burial site in what was then the center of town. The first bishop was Reginbrand, a missionary bishop of Aros in 948 under the Archbishop of Hamburg. Aros came under the rule of the Archbishop of Viborg in 1060. According to Adam of Bremen, Aros was made a dependent diocese before 998.

St. Nikolai's church was the first cathedral of Aros. The second cathedral was a timber structure built in 1102 by bishop Ulfketil near the present site to house the relics of St. Clement. St. Clement was an early Bishop of Rome who was martyred by having an anchor tied to his neck and thrown into the Black Sea, according to a fictional biography of the saint. Clement was the patron saint of sailors and especially popular in Scandinavia. The first St. Clement's church burned at some point before the 1190s.

This timber church was the center of the local veneration of St. Niels of Aarhus (also called St. Nickolas). St. Niels was a younger son of King Canute V. As a young man, Prince Niels lost interest in life at court and withdrew to the village of Skibby near Aarhus and built a church with his own hands. He lived a saintly life and helped the people in the area around Aarhus. One day, as he and a few men from the town were felling trees to build the church at Viby near the sea, one of the men complained that he was thirsty. St. Niels prayed for water and a spring appeared to slake the man's thirst; St. Niels's Spring has run ever since. It has been a place of pilgrimage for hundreds of years and many miraculous healings are said to have taken place there, especially on St. John's Day. On his death bed in 1180, St. Niels asked to be buried in "the little church by the sea" (St. Clements). He was buried in the churchyard at St. Clements.

=== Aarhus Cathedral ===
The construction of Aarhus Cathedral began in the decade after year 1190, by Bishop Peder Vognsen (d.11 April 1204) of the powerful Hvide family from Zealand. Bishop Vognsen built the cathedral around St. Clement's church because local people venerated St. Niels, and Vognsen wanted to harness that devotion for his cathedral. Vognsen also established the cathedral school of Aarhus Katedralskole, before the cathedral was completed. The church was finished in 1300 in typical Romanesque style with half-rounded arches supporting a flat timber ceiling. The second St. Clements was built of large red bricks, a new building material that became popular all over Scandinavia and northern Germany for ecclesiastical and public buildings. Four chapels were built into the north transept. The episcopal chair was moved from Our Lady Church to St. Clements.

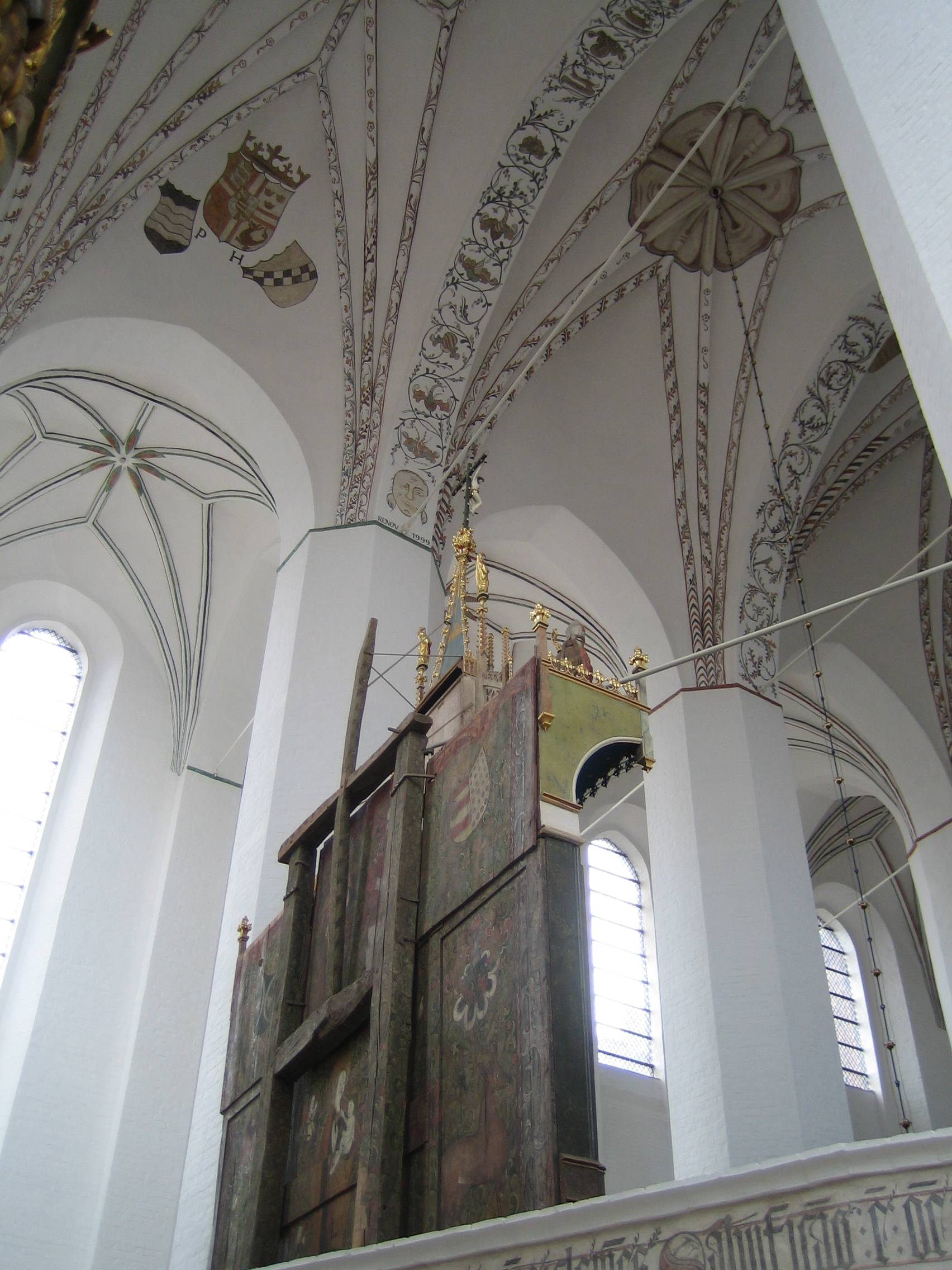
Gothic vaults (with paint restored in 1999), windows and the back of the altar in the Aarhus Cathedral

However, in 1330, the cathedral and much of the town burned down, and the church was abandoned until 1449. By then the Gothic style of architecture had reached Denmark, and the cathedral was enlarged in stages until it reached its present size in year 1500. The nave was lengthened to 93 meters, the longest in Denmark. The transept was widened, and the typical Gothic vaulting raised the ceilings and permitted high windows which fill the building with light.

The Reformation changed life in and around the cathedral in many significant ways. In 1524 Hans Tausen (1494–1561), the Danish Luther, taught a Good Friday sermon at Antvorskov Abbey proclaiming the doctrines of Luther. His superior ordered him imprisoned in the Hospitallers monastery in Viborg, Jutland. Tausen taught from his cell and ordinary people responded with enthusiasm. His superior tried to silence Tausen, but a near riot forced his release. In the beginning, he was allowed to preach in the open air but his supporters broke open a Franciscan church, and soon Tausen had more followers than the church could accommodate. Within a year, he was the king's own chaplain. Luther's ideas quickly spread to Aarhus and soon the townspeople demanded the right to hear the liturgy in Danish. The bishop and canons attempted to stop the spread of the Lutheran doctrine in their diocese, but Tausen had caught the imagination of the people and they would not be cowed by anything the bishop might threaten. Most nobles were staunchly Catholic, and that brought even more support from common people. By 1528 most of the cities had begun the process of reforming their churches. Tausen taught that tearing apart ancient churches was wrong and that orderly change should be used to reform the church.

In 1533 Frederik I died and his son, Christian III was proclaimed King of Denmark at the Viborg Assembly (Danish: Landsting), but the State Council denominated by the Catholic bishops refused to accept the election and called upon count Christopher of Oldenburg to assist in restoring Catholic Christian II to the throne. This resulted in a two-year war called the Count's Feud. Despite the odds, Christian III prevailed and in the summer of 1536 arrested several of the bishops and threw them into prison. The last Roman Catholic Bishop of Aarhus, Ove Bille (d. 1555) was imprisoned in the summer of 1536 when Denmark officially became a Lutheran nation.

The tower is the tallest in Denmark at 96 meters. It received its present form in 1931. In 1642 lightning struck the tower and set it ablaze, destroying some of the historic bells, but damage to the interior of the church was minimal.

== Interior ==
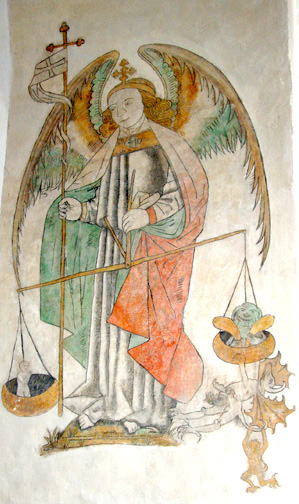
Medieval fresco in typical Danish style

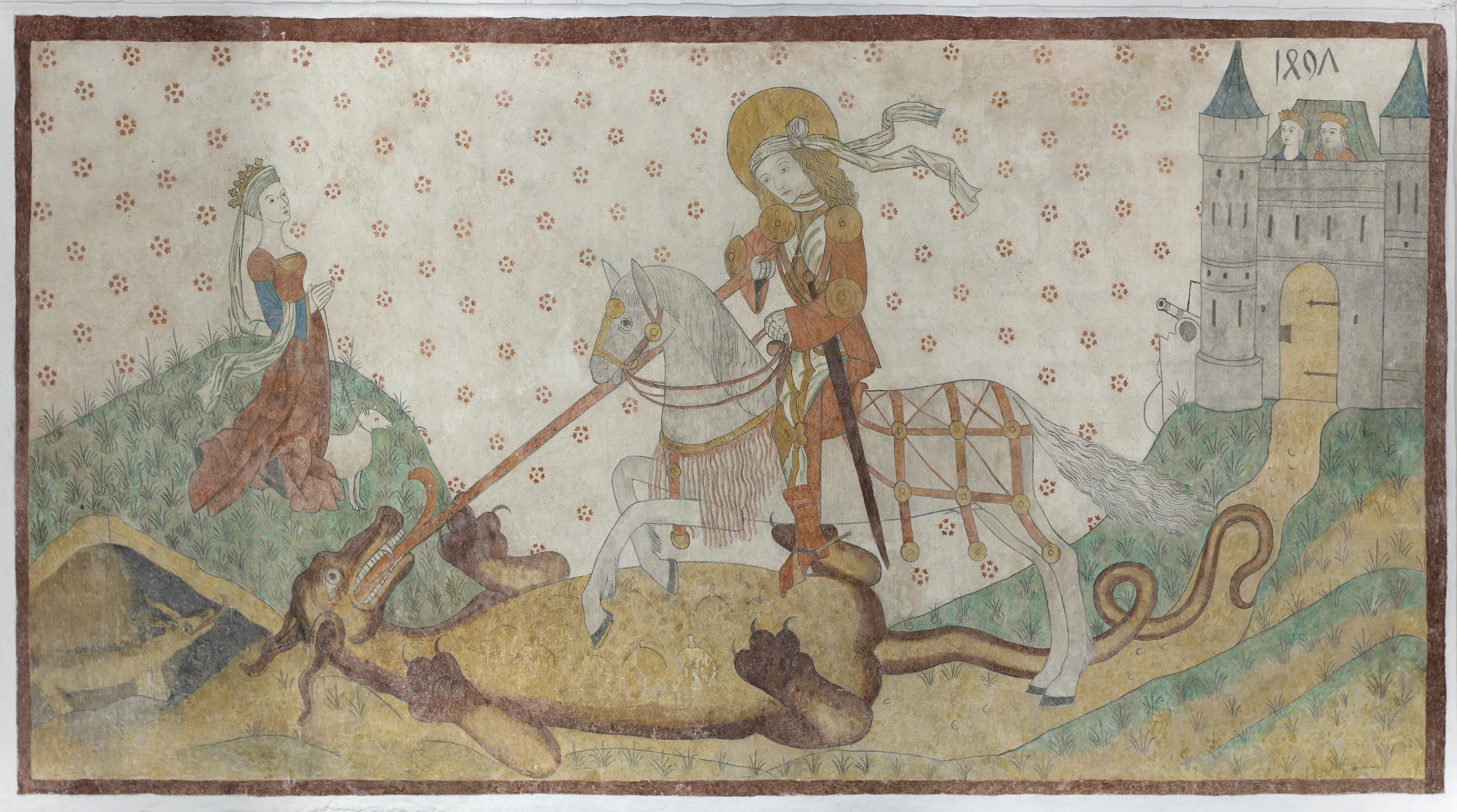
A fresco of St. George with the dragon inside the Aarhus Cathedral

=== The fresco paintings and the stained glass window ===
Aarhus Cathedral has a number of fresco paintings dating from 1470 to 1520. Until the Reformation, most of the church's walls were covered in frescoes, of which many were lost. The cathedral still has 220 square metres (2,400 sq ft) of frescoes, more than any other church in Denmark. One pre-1470 painting was saved from the first Romanesque-style cathedral in the northwest corner, the so-called Lazarus Window, painted about 1300. It is believed that the window was used to give food to the lepers who weren't permitted inside the building.

The paintings of St Christopher and St Clement are the tallest in the country. Other figures include St Michael and St George with the dragon (pictured, left).

St Clements only has one stained glass window. It was created by Norwegian artist Emanuel Vigeland (1875–1948) in 1926. Its theme is taken from N. F. S. Grundtvig's hymn Da livtræet fæstet i graven rod. It stands 14 metres (46 ft) high and is the largest stained glass window in all of Denmark. Three scenes are painted on the window: at the bottom, Christ's lying in his grave on Golgotha; next, Christ crucified, and topmost, Christ standing in golden light. The most unusual feature is the Crucifixion scene, which (for an unknown reason) shows Jesus's head falling to the left, unlike traditional scenes which always show Jesus's head falling to the right.

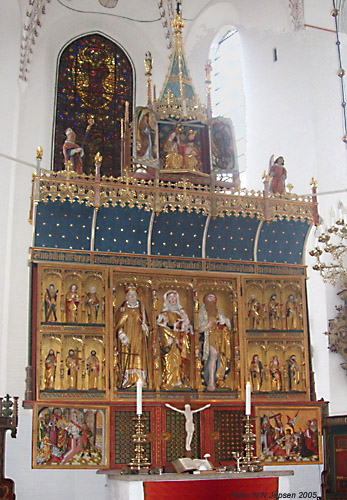
Altar by Bernt Notke

=== The altar ===
The cathedral has a wonderful altarpiece (pictured, left) carved by the famous Lübeck sculptor and painter Bernt Notke) (c. 1440–c. 1509). It was dedicated on Easter Sunday 1479 and is one of Denmark's great treasures. The altarpiece is unusual in that it has movable sections, so different scenes may be viewed during the liturgical calendar.

The pulpit was carved in oak by sculptor Mikkel van Groningen and dedicated in 1588. It shows scenes from the Old and New Testaments.

=== The baptismal font ===
The baptismal font was created in copper by the bell maker, Peter Hansen of Flensborg, in 1481. It was a gift of Bishop Jens Ivarsen Lange, (d. 1482) who just two years earlier had given the great altarpiece to St Clements. The font stands on the heads of the four evangelists in human form, but with the heads of the animals that often symbolize the four gospels in ecclesiastic art: John is eagle-headed, Mark is lion-headed, Luke bears the head of an ox, while Matthew alone has the head of a man.

The font has four scenes, carved in relief, from the life of Christ and nine of the apostles (the rest of the figures cannot be identified). The scenes are the Baptism, the Crucifixion, Christ on Judgement Day, and Mary's heavenly coronation.

For the first hundred years, the font was open and the priest dipped the child three times; later there were added a brass top and a silver tray used for the baptism of children, which is now over 300 years old.

=== Golden gates, the bells and the model ship ===
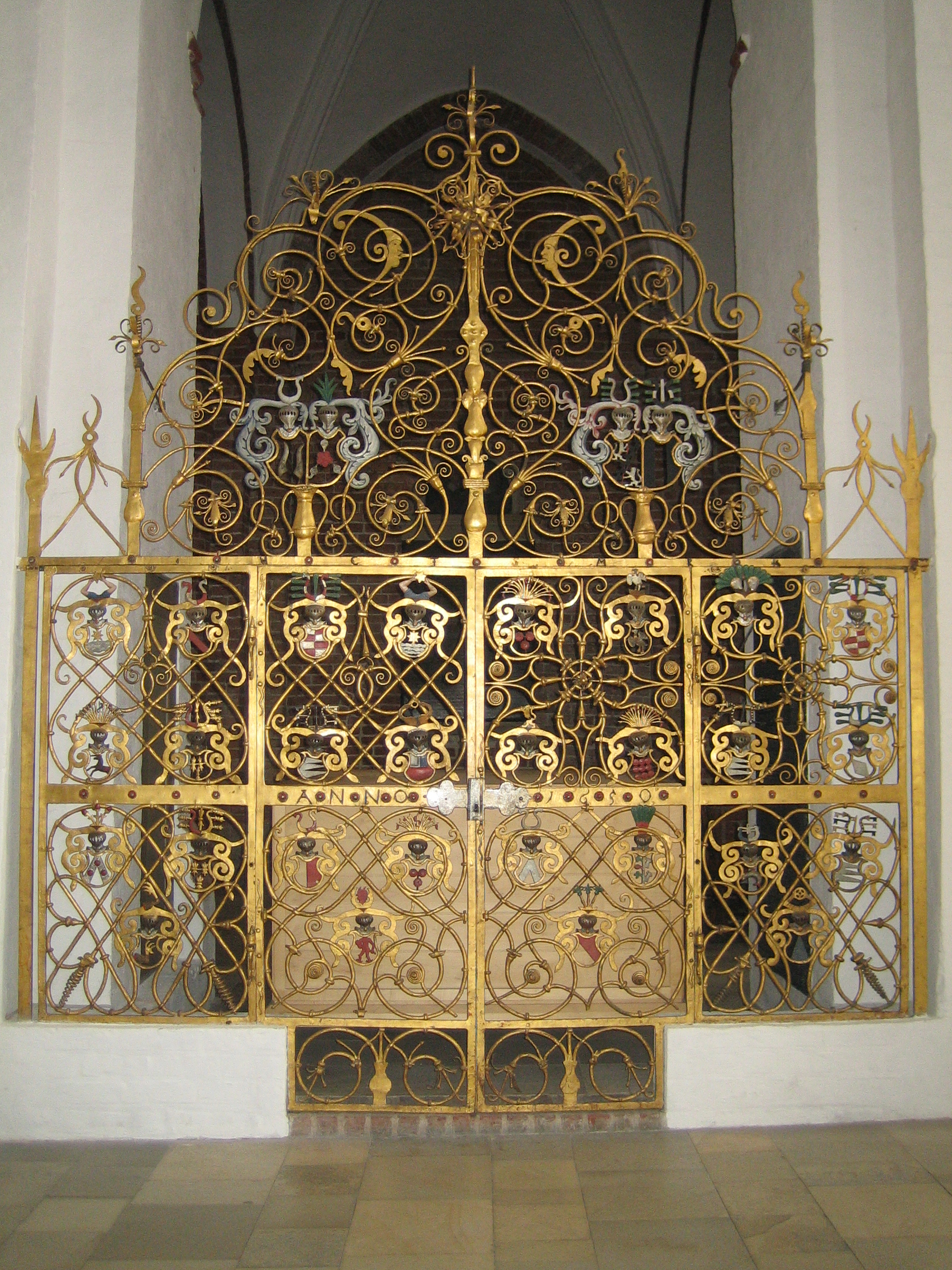
One of the golden gates inside the Aarhus Cathedral

The "Golden Door" is one of five wrought iron gates that separate the nave from the choir, a reminder of the separation between the clergy and public in Catholic times. The gates were made by German-born artist Caspar Fincke (1584–1655).

In the huge bell tower hang eight bells. In 1642 lightning struck the tower and set it ablaze and damaged some of the bells. The oldest bell was cast in the 13th century by Martinus. The next one was cast in 1493 by "p l". The next one was cast in 1505 by Per Tidichsøn. The next one was cast in 1746 by Caspar Kønig. The next one was cast in 1762 by M. C. Troschell. The next one was cast in 1893 by L. Andersen. The next one was cast in 1893 by L. Andersen. The newest bell was cast in 1894 by S. Frichs Eft.

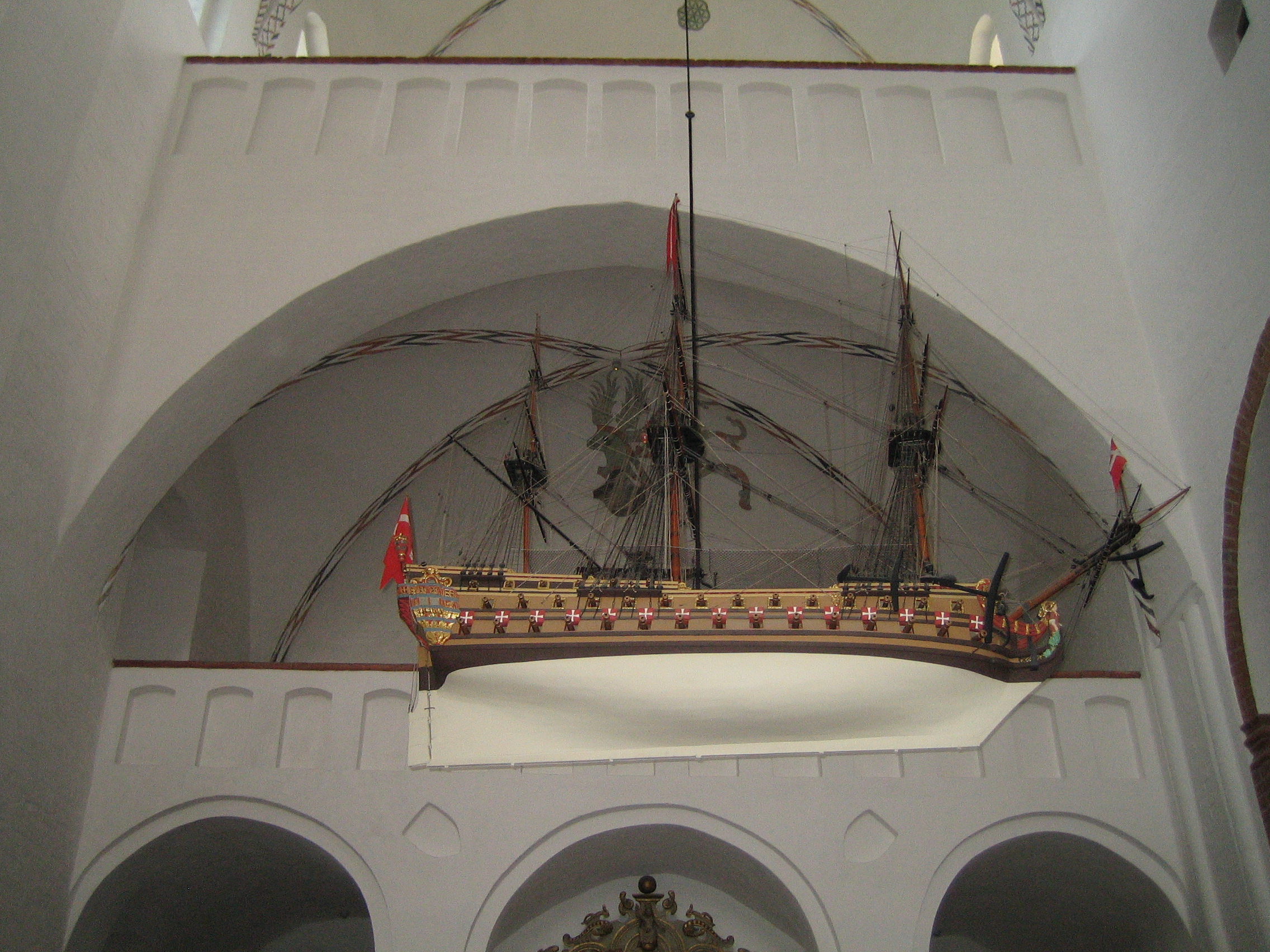
A model ship exhibited inside the Aarhus Cathedral

As is the custom in many parts of Denmark, a ship hangs at the crossing as a reminder of those lost at sea and of Denmark's close connection to the sea (pictured, left). The cathedral's ship (dated 1720) is named Enigheden (lit. English Unity) and it might have been built in Holland: the Russian tsar Peter the Great ordered warships from shipbuilders in Holland; instead of sketches, he was offered a model of the upcoming ship, which was sent by sea to Russia. A storm sank the transport by Skagen, and the model made it to shore almost intact. Some fishermen from Aarhus bought the model and subsequently offered it as a votive gift to the Aarhus Domkirke.

With the model ship's length of 2.65 metres (8 ft 8 in) and height of 3.50 metres (11.5 ft), it is the largest church ship in any Danish church, and it is thought of as a symbol of man's sail from cradle to grave.

=== Tombs and memorials ===
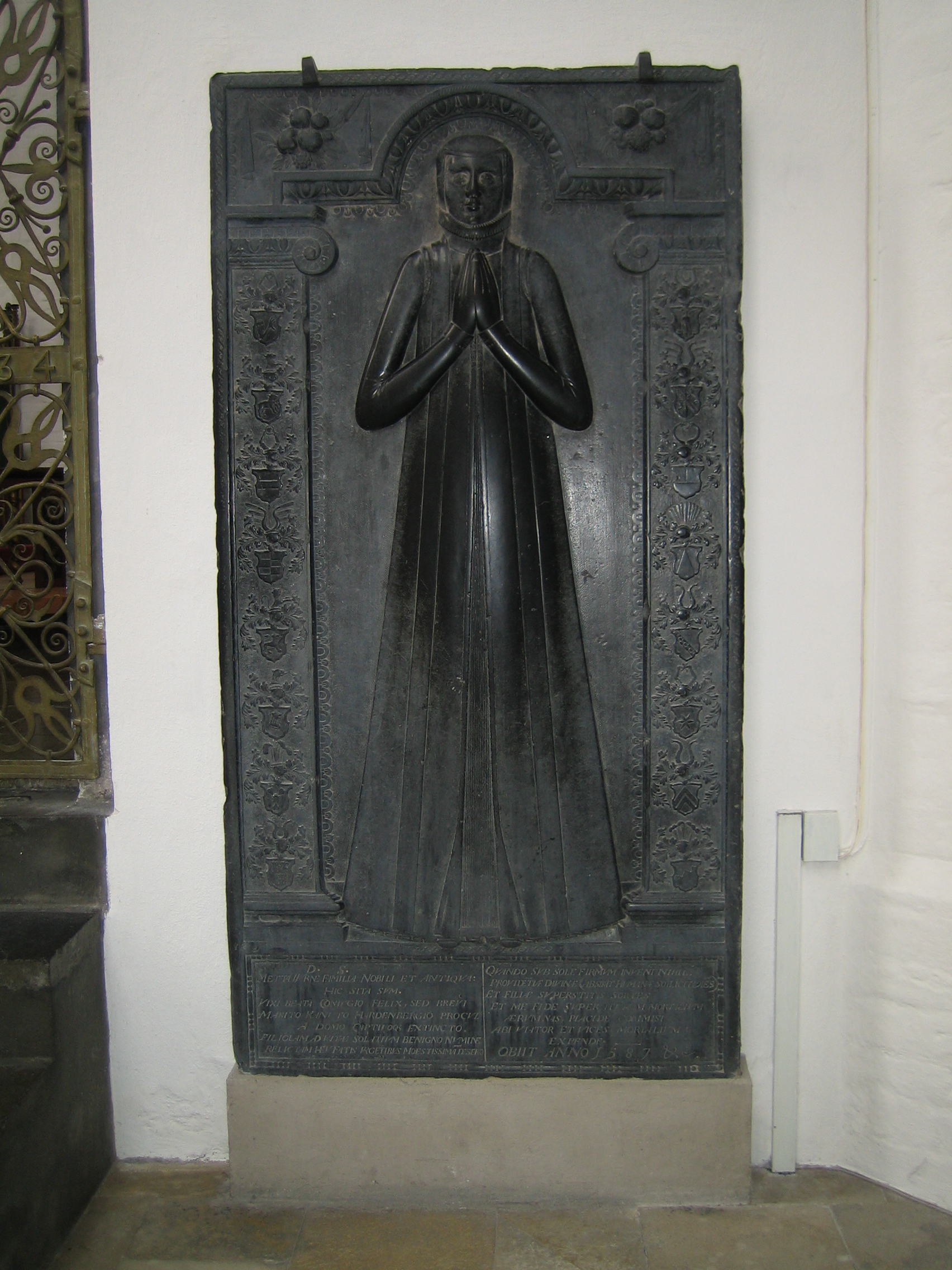
A memorial plaque (dated 1587) above a tomb of a noble woman in the Aarhus Cathedral

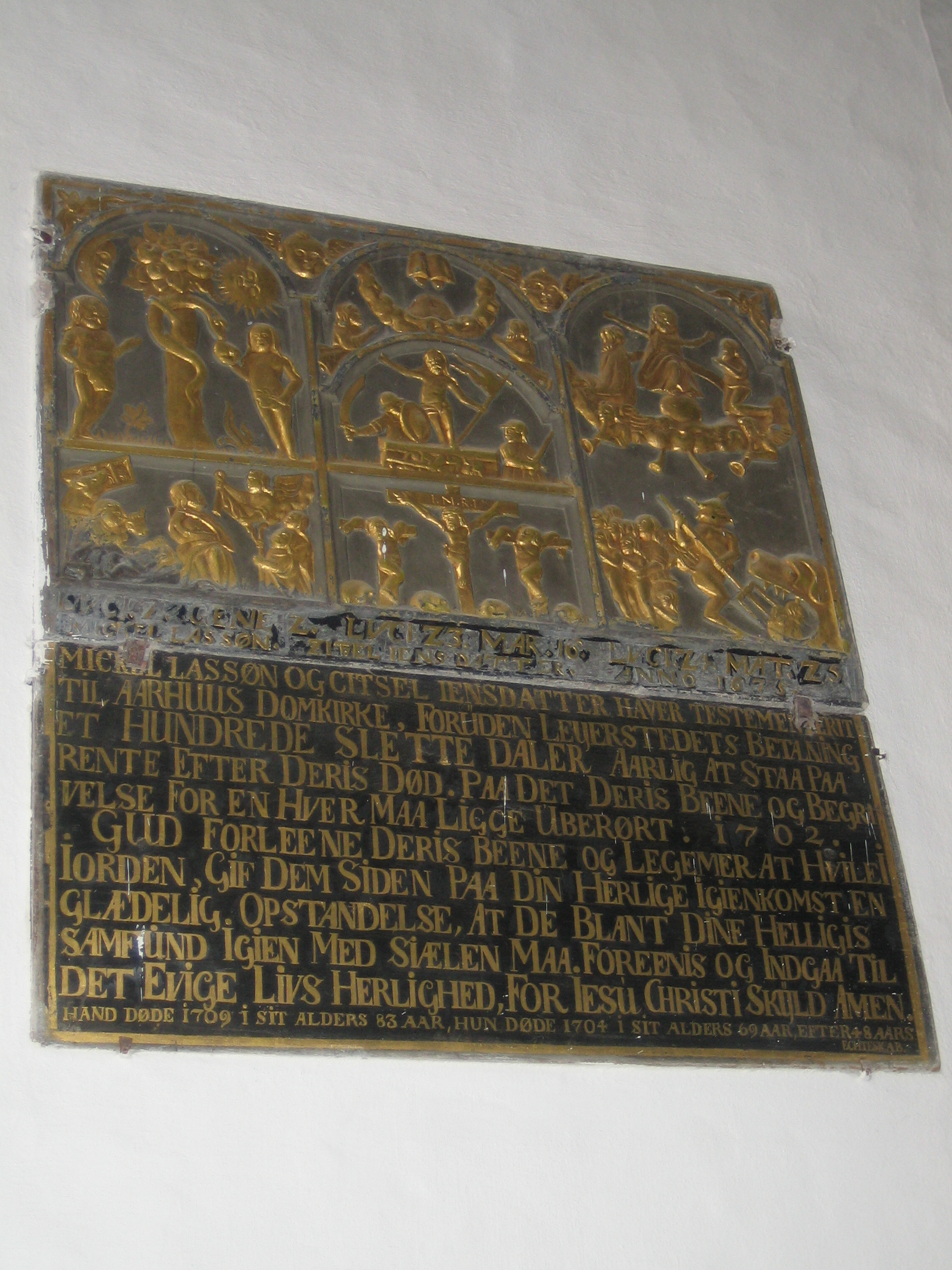
A memorial plaque (in Danish) remembering a donation of 100 Thalers left to the cathedral in 1702 by an elderly married couple

The crypt of the cathedral houses the remains of thousands of people of all ranks. The church has several chapels and tombs (in both Romanesque and Baroque styles), and a number of memorials. The most striking is the Marselis Chapel, built for the Marselis family by the Flemish baroque sculptor Thomas Quellinus (1661-c.1710); the chapel's high Baroque memorial is the largest of its kind in Denmark, and beneath the floor is the family burial vault.

=== The organ ===
The main pipe organ was built by the organ builder Lambert Daniel Kastens (c. 1690–1744) in 1730. He was a student of one of Europe's best-known organ makers, Arp Schnitger (1648–1719) of Hamburg. It has been restored, enlarged, and updated several times, but the baroque facade has been maintained. The majority of voices in the current organ are built by the organ builders Th. Frobenius & Sons between 1928 and 2001. The most recent restoration took place between 2018 and 2020 by Danish organ builders Marcussen & Søn With 89 organ stop it is now Denmark's largest church organ. In 1885, pianist, composer and conductor Robert William Otto Allen (1852–1888) became the organist.

==== Organ specifications ====
Manual I, Great

Principal 16'
Gedakt 16'
Principal 8'
Spidsfløjte 8'
Gedakt 8'
Viola da Gamba 8'
Oktav 4'
Spidsfløjte 4'
Quint 2 2/3'
Superoktav 2'
Terts 1 3/5'
Mixtur VI
Cymbel IV
Trompet 16'
Trompet 8'
Clairon 4'

Manual IV, Echo

Hulfløjte 8'
Spidsgamba 8'
Unda maris 8'
Principal 4'
Fløjte 4'
Nasat 2 2/3'
Nathorn 2'
Spidsfløjte 2'
Terz 1 3/5'
Sivfløjte 1'
Mixtur IV
Cor anglais 8'
Vox humana 8'

Manual II, Positive

Gedackt 16'
Principal 8'
Rørfløjte 8'
Quintatøn 8'
Octav 4'
Gedaktfløjte 4'
Octav 2'
Blokfløjte 2'
Larigot 1 1/3'
Octav 1'
Sesquialtera II
Scharf IV
Dulcian 16'
Trompet 8'
Krumhorn 8'
Skalmej 4'

Manual IV,

Crown Positive

Tectus 8'
Rørfløjte 4'
Principal 2'
Spidsquint 1 1/3'
Skalmeje 8'

Pedal

Bordunbas 32'
Principal 16'
Subbas 16'
Gedaktbas 16'
Violone 16'
Rørquint 10 2/3'
Octav 8'

Manual III, Swell

Bordun 16'
Principal 8'
Rørgedackt 8'
Flûte harmonique 8'
Salicional 8'
Vox celeste 8'
Violinprincipal 4'
Tværfløjte 4'
Fugara 4'
Octavfløjte 2'
Cornet II
Mixtur V
Fagot 16'
Trompette harmonique 8'
Obo 8'
Clairon 4'

Pedal (contd.)

Gedakt 8'
Violoncello 8'
Octav 4'
Træfløjte 4'
Quintatøn 4'
Hulfløjte 2'
Flautino 1'
Septima III
Mixtur IV-VI
Contrabombarde 32'
Bombarde 16'
Basun 16'
Fagot 16'
Basun 8'
Serpent 8'
Trompet 4'
Regal 2'

Manual compass = C–c^{4}, Pedal compass = C–g^{1}.

In addition to the main organ, the cathedral also houses a smaller 2-manual organ with 23 stops, built in 1970 by Danish organ builders Bruno Christensen & Sønner, as well as a movable 4-stop positive organ.

== See also ==
- List of Churches in Aarhus
