= Ulfketil (bishop of Aarhus) =

Danish bishop

Ulfketil was the third bishop of the Diocese of Aarhus, from 1102 to 1134. He participated in the Battle of Fotevik on the side of king Niels of Denmark. Ulfketil died during the battle along with 4 other Danish bishops.

Catholic Church titles
Preceded by Christian	Bishop of Aarhus; 1102–1134	Succeeded by Eskil
