= Niels of Aarhus =

Danish saint

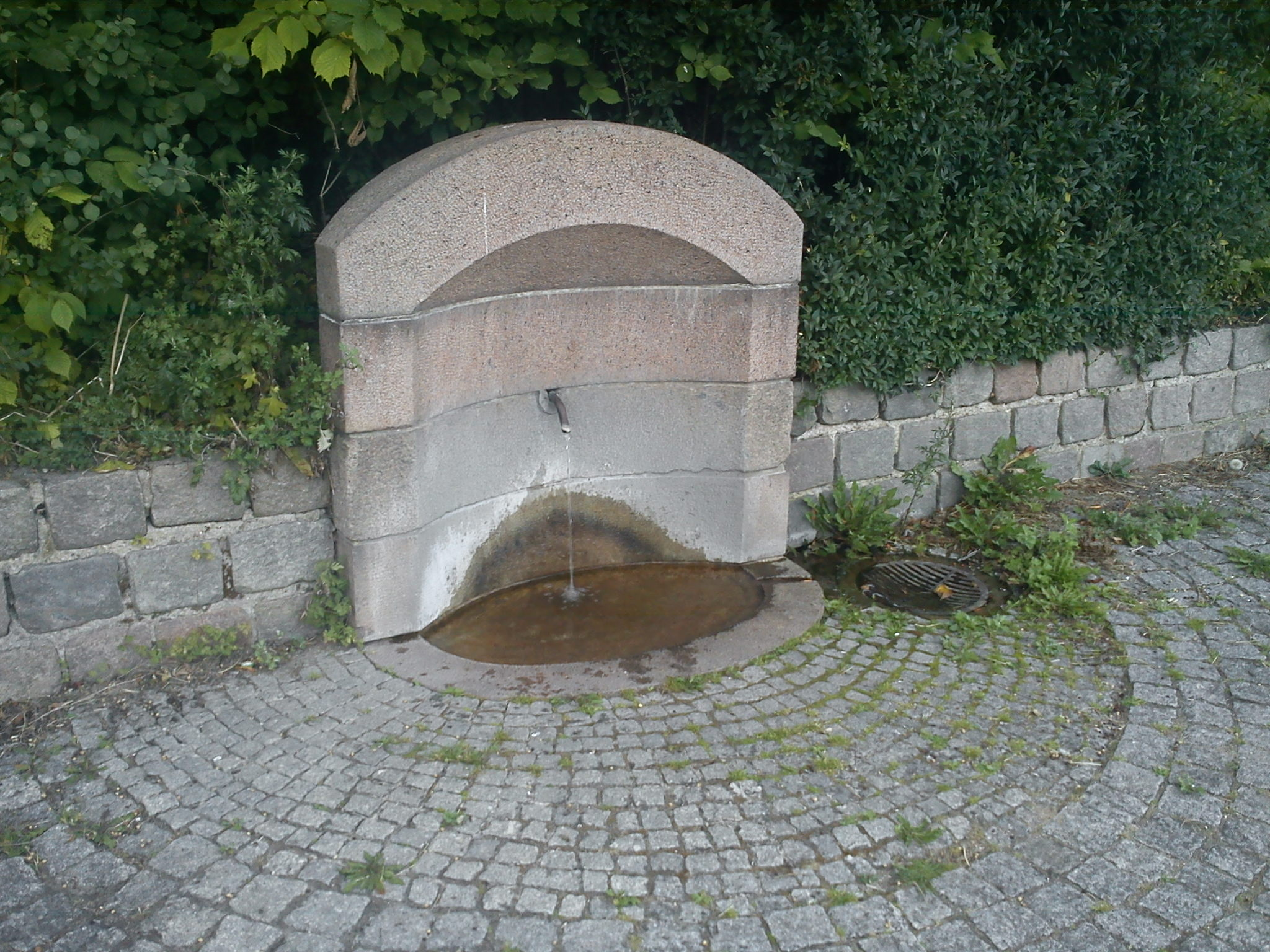
Hellig Niels' Kilde (lit.: Holy Niels' Spring) at Frederiksbjerg in Aarhus.

Saint Niels of Aarhus or Niels the Holy (Danish: Niels den Hellige; before 1157 - 1180) was a Danish prince who lived an ascetic life and was revered as a saint in Aarhus until the 18th century even though he was never canonized.

== Biography ==
Born Niels Knudsen, he was an illegitimate son of King Canute V by an unknown woman. He was a brother of Bishop Valdemar of Schleswig. He was probably named after his great-grandfather King Niels of Denmark.

As a young man, Prince Niels lost interest in life at the court and withdrew to the village of Skibby near Aarhus, where he built a church with his own hands. He lived a saintly life and helped the people in the area around Aarhus. One day, as he and a few men from the town were felling trees to build another church at Viby near the sea, one of the men complained that he was thirsty. St. Niels prayed for water and a spring appeared to slake the man's thirst; St. Niels's Spring (Hellig Niels' Kilde) has run ever since. It has been a place of pilgrimage for hundreds of years and many miraculous healings are said to have taken place there, especially on St. John's Day. On his death bed in 1180, St. Niels asked to be buried in "the little church by the sea" (St. Clements). He was buried in the churchyard at St. Clements Church. Aarhus Cathedral was later erected near the site and became the center of the local veneration of St. Niels of Aarhus (also called St. Nickolas).
