= Adaldag =

German archbishop (died 988)

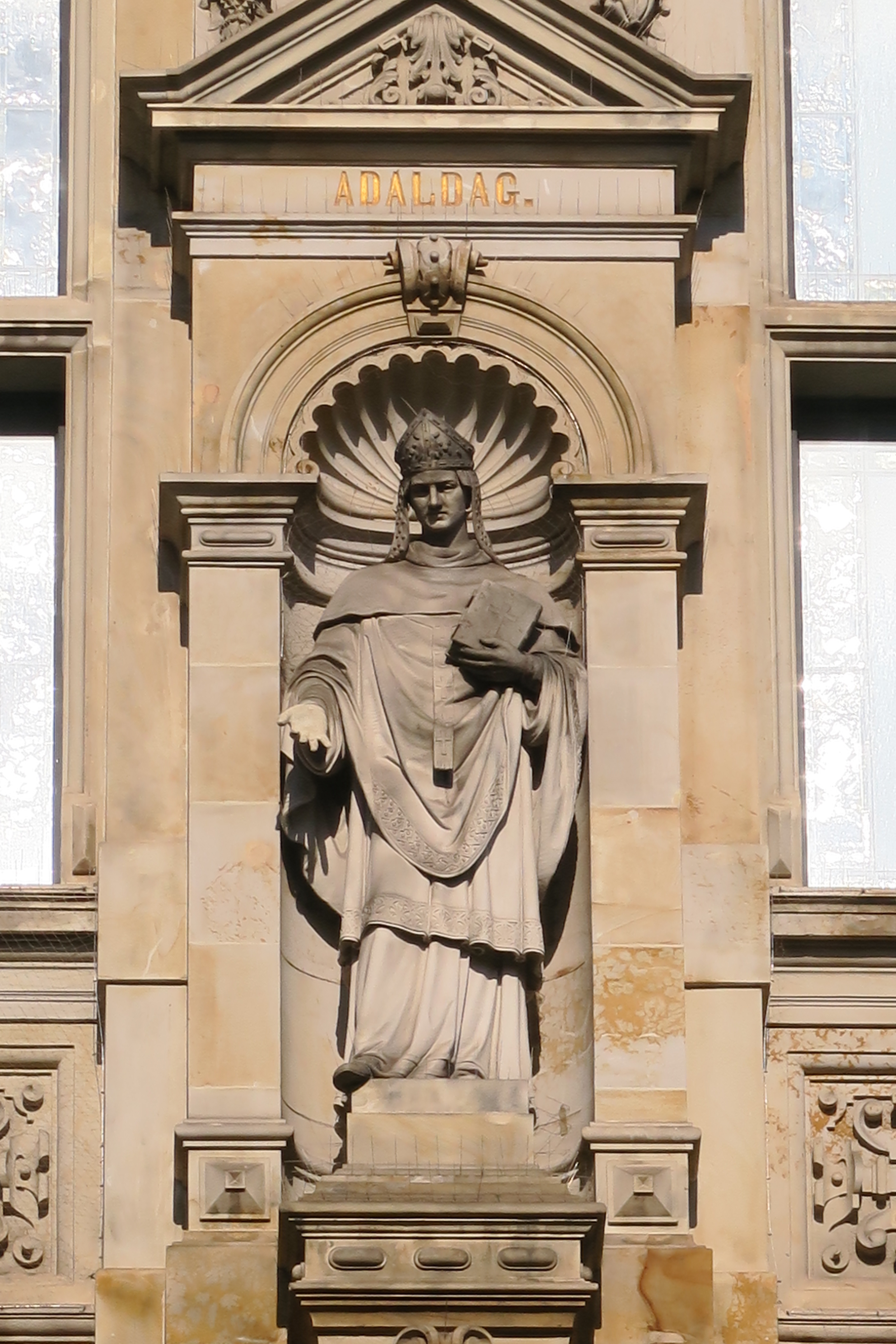
Adaldag

Adaldag (c. 900 – 28 April 988; also Adelgis, Adelger, and Adalgag) was the seventh archbishop of Hamburg-Bremen, from 937 until his death.

== Life ==
Adaldag was of noble birth, a relation and pupil of Adalward, Bishop of Verden, and became canon of Hildesheim. Otto I made him his chancellor and notary immediately after his accession. He enjoyed the favor of Otto's mother, Queen Matilda. On the death of Archbishop Unni of Hamburg-Bremen in 936, Otto nominated him to the vacant see, and granted him all the rights of a count.

None of the early incumbents of the see ruled for so long, and none did so much for the diocese, though his success was partly the fruit of his predecessors’ labors and of peculiarly favorable circumstances. Under Adaldag the metropolitan see obtained its first suffragans, by the erection of the bishoprics of Ribe, Schleswig, and Århus; and that of the Slavic territories of Aldenburg (today's Oldenburg in Holstein) was also placed under Hamburg. (Not to be confused with Oldenburg in Oldenburg, which had formerly belonged to the diocese of Verden.)

He resisted successfully a renewal of the efforts of Cologne to claim jurisdiction over Bremen. He gained many privileges for his see, in jurisdiction, possession of land, and market rights, by his close relations with the emperors, especially Otto I. He accompanied the latter on his journey to Rome, and remained with him from 961 to 965, and is mentioned as the emperor's chief counselor at the time of his coronation in Rome. Otto placed the deposed pope Benedict V in his custody in Hamburg. As Benedict was considered both holy and learned, the Archbishop kept him in great honor until his death some months later.

After Adaldag's return to Hamburg, he still maintained these relations, and his privileges were confirmed by Otto II and by the regency of Otto III. The later years of his life were troubled by inroads of the Danes and Slavonians on the north. He rebuilt Hamburg after the sack of the city in 983 by the Obotrites under Mistiwoi.

Adaldag Born: around 900 Died: 28 April 988 in Hamburg?
Christian titles
Preceded by Unni	Archbishop of Bremen-Hamburg; 936-988	Succeeded by Liawizo I (also Libizo, Latin: Libentius)
New diocese	Bishop of Schleswig; 947	Succeeded by Hored (also Horath or Oredo)
