= Peder Vognsen =

Danish bishop

Peder Vognsen (died 11 April 1204) was bishop of the Diocese of Aarhus from 1191 until his death in 1204. He belonged to the nobility as a member of the Hvide clan and was related to Archbishop Absalon (his mother's cousin). He used his extensive private means to found Aarhus Cathedral. He established several prebends for the cathedral which were authorized by Pope Celestine III in 1197 and confirmed by Pope Innocent III in 1198. From the deed of his donation to the cathedral in 1203, it can be seen he owned a large estate in Zealand including four churches. Peder Vognsen is entombed in Aarhus Cathedral. He is commemorated by a black marble slab in the chancel.

Catholic Church titles
Preceded by Svend I	Bishop of Aarhus; 1191–1204	Succeeded by Skjalm Vognsen
