= Reginbrand =

Reginbrand (d. 988) was a bishop of the Ancient See of Aarhus. He was ordained by bishop Adaldag of Hamburg-Bremen in 948 in the first ordination of bishops in the Scandinavian countries. The ordination had the explicit support of the pope who wished to expand Christianity into northern Europe. Adaldag ordained three bishops for the Jutland region; Harald to Slesvig, Ljufdag to Ribe and Reginbrand to Aarhus. The meeting was attended by Otto the Great and Louis IV along with 34 German, French and Danish bishops, in the St. Remigius Kirche in Ingelheim am Rhein.

The ordination of Reginbrand is seen as an important point in the history of Jutland and Aarhus. It happened two decades before Harald Bluetooth officially christened Denmark and meant that all ecclesiastical affairs could be conducted domestically without interference by international diplomacy and politics. Of Reginbrand's life and death little is known and the See of Aarhus was temporarily vacant after his death in 988.
