= Gazmend =

- Gender: male

Origin
- Origin: Albanian
- Meaning: Joyful
- Region of origin: Albania

Gazmend is an Albanian given name. Notable people with the given name include:

- Gazmend Çitaku (born 1970), Albanian Montenegrin photographer, publisher and librarian
- Gazmend Demi (born 1963), Albanian businessman
- Gazmend Kapllani (born 1967), Albanian-born writer and journalist
- Gazmend Leka (born 1953), Albanian painter, artistic director and scholar
- Gazmend Muhaxheri (born 1964), Kosovar politician
- Gazmend Oketa (born 1968), Albanian politician
- Gazmend Pula, Kosovar-Albanian intellectual, human rights campaigner, and diplomat
- Gazmend Sinani (1991–2018), Kosovo Albanian basketball player
