= Kapllani =

Kapllani is an Albanian surname. Notable people with the surname include:

- Dejvid Kapllani (born 2001), Albanian footballer
- Edmond Kapllani (born 1982), Albanian footballer
- Gazmend Kapllani (born 1967), Albanian-born writer and journalist
- Xhevair Kapllani (born 1974), Albanian footballer
