= Field school =

A field school is a short term academic program consisting of mentored field research – usually taking place during the summer and often abroad – designed to provide practical training for students on subjects in which they previously learned only theoretical information in classrooms. Field schools are experiential programs where students learn primarily by doing.

== Format ==
Field schools are normally directed by academic faculty, and the students are sometimes awarded academic credit units and a letter grade for their participation. Programs are typically intensive, and students and faculty work many hours each day together. They frequently involve learning through the process of conducting primary research in the field.

The faculty to student ratio in field schools is kept between 1:20 and 1:6. The result is team learning and mentoring of students. Lectures are a mainstay for many field schools.

Some disciplines require field school participation as a condition for graduating with a BA or BS degree. Archaeology, geology, and paleontology are typically such disciplines although specific requirements differ from one university to the next.

Disciplines that typically require, or strongly encourage students to participate in a field school as part of the requirement for graduation include:

1. Archaeology
2. Geology
3. Paleontology
4. Environmental studies
5. Primatology
6. Marine biology
7. Anthropology
8. Geography

== Statistics ==
Data about field school attendance is not easily available. The Institute for International Education – the organization that collects data about US students studying abroad through its annual Open Doors Report – does not designate students participating in field schools, or even research-based programs, as a category in its analysis. It is unknown how many students participate in field school activities annually, whether within or outside the US.

As universities offer an increasing number of online classes and as the Massive open online course (MOOC’s) are becoming popular, the demand for intensive, time-condensed field training programs surges. Universities are moving to outsource such activities as they wish to minimize investment and exposure and are turning to organizations that can both guarantee quality of education and assume liability exposure.

== Financial issues ==
In recent years, field schools have emerged as significant sources of revenue, and universities are trying to attract students outside of those matriculating in their institution and charge hefty fees. The 2008 financial crisis resulted in the cutting of institutional subsidies for many field schools in the US, and many of them now charge the full costs of the program.

Universities rarely monitor the quality of the field schools they offer as these are off campus, typically small in scale and effective monitoring requires significant investment of resources. The result is that university-based field schools are effectively unmonitored and have significant differences in quality.

== Independent field schools ==
In recent decades, independent and highly specialized academic organizations have emerged that run field schools independent of universities. Such organizations are dedicated operators of research-based field schools and use economies of scale to produce quality programs. Students from any university may apply to such programs. The School for Field Studies in ecology, Sea Semester in marine biology, the Institute for Field Research in archaeology, and Field School in marine biology and environmental studies are examples of such high end organizations.
