= St. Nicolas' Church, Rønne =

Coordinates: 55°05′56″N 14°41′52″E

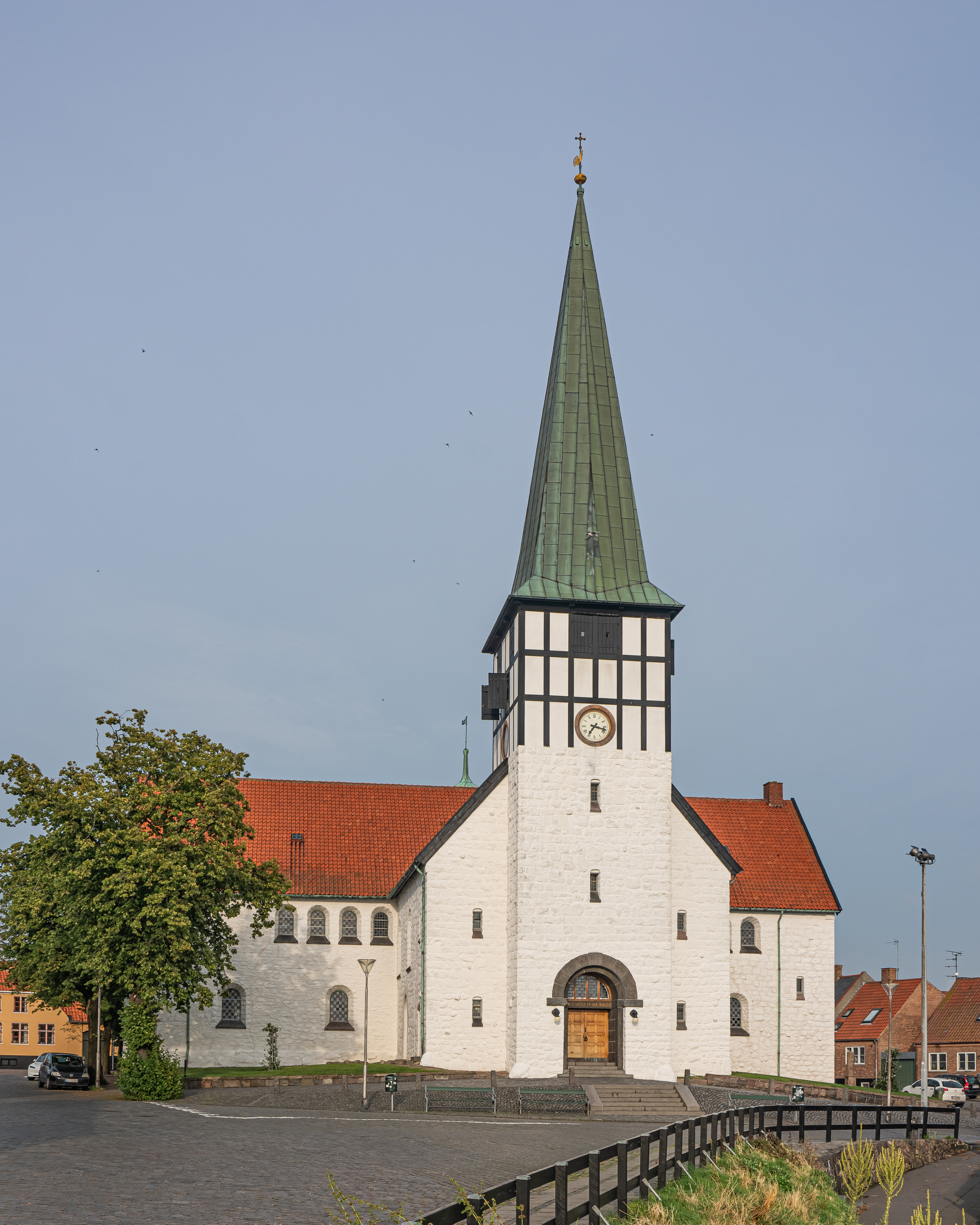
St. Nicolas Church, Rønne

St. Nicolas' Church (Danish: Sankt Nicolai kirke) with its distinctive tower is the parish church of Rønne on the island of Bornholm in the Diocese of Copenhagen. Enlarged and fully refurbished in 1918, it stands near the harbour on the site of an earlier church or chapel from the 13th century.

== History ==
Today's church is built on the site of a much smaller building from c. 1275 known as Knuds Kirke (Canute's Church). Some of its foundations can still be seen on the northeast corner of the church. Around 1350, as Rønne gained importance, the church was extended towards the west almost doubling in length. A tower on the west end was added in 1550 but was rebuilt in 1699. Galleries were added to accommodate the growing congregation. In 1797, the north transept was added. From 1915 to 1918, major extensions were made, as far as possible without altering the style. The building was widened and a southern transept was completed. Further restoration work was carried out in 1982–83 when the floor of local Paradisbakke granite was laid throughout the church.

== Artefacts ==
Much of the church's inventory has been retained over the centuries. The smallest of the three bells dates from 1300 and was cast in Germany. The oldest bell was cast in 1433 by Anonym. The next one was cast in the 15th century by Anonym. The newest bell was cast in 1903 by B. Low & Søn.

The wooden altar carved by Christian Kofoed dates from 1918. It depicts the Agnus dei with the flag of victory. Kofoed also designed the pulpit and the pews. The painting above the altar depicting Jesus calming the storm is the work of Sven Havsteen Mikkelsen (1912–1999).

Some of the church's earlier artefacts can be seen in Bornholm Museum.

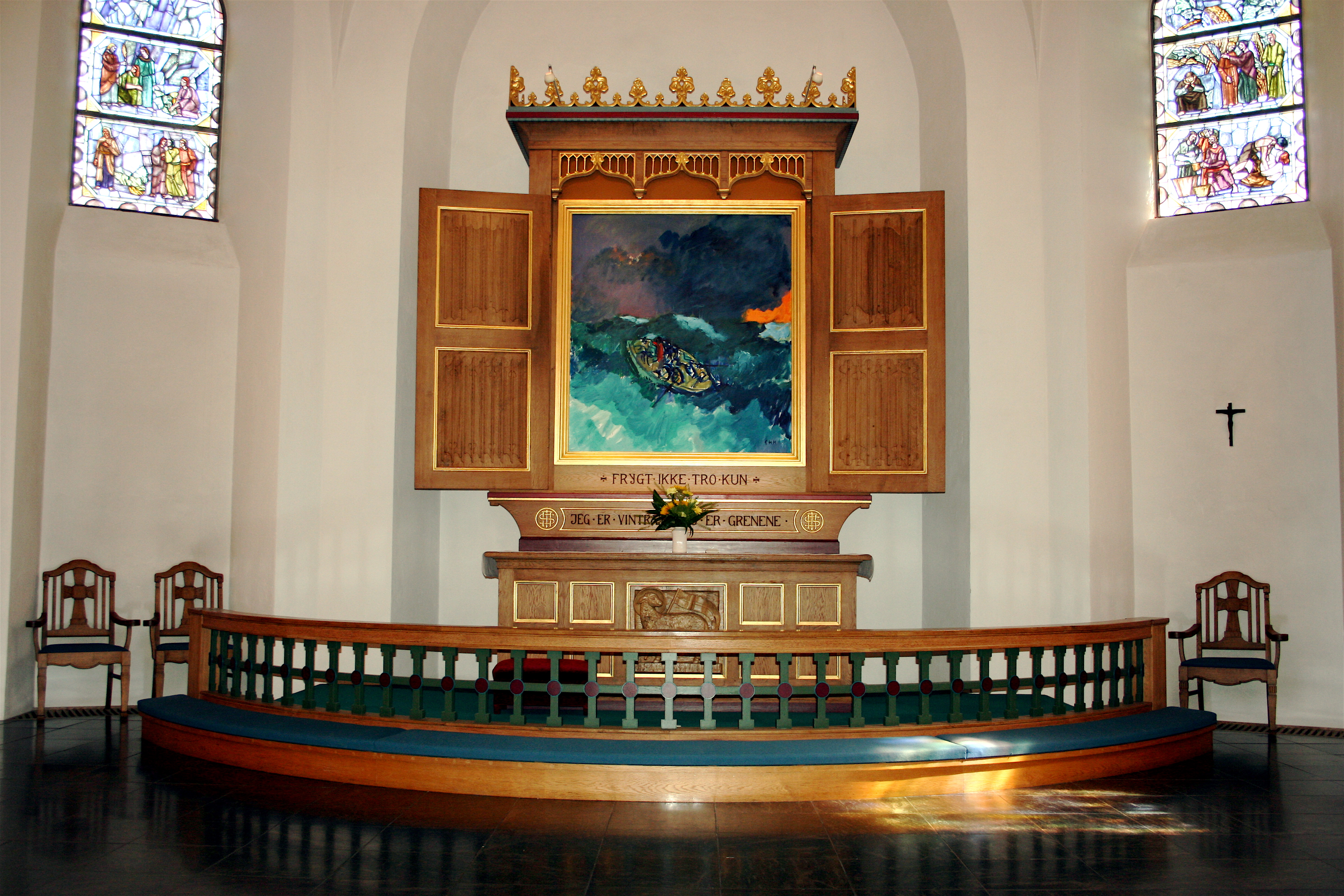
Altar

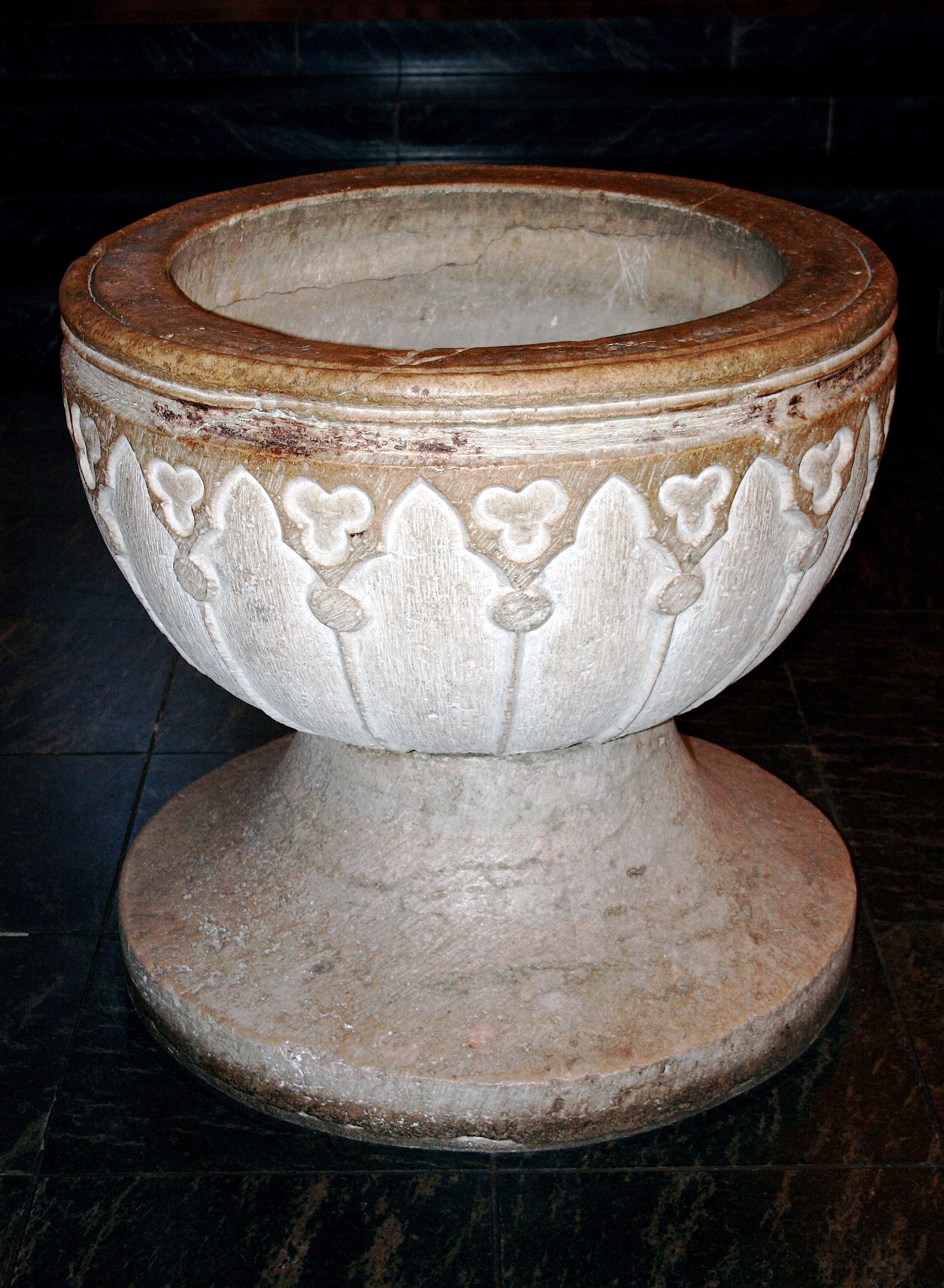
Font

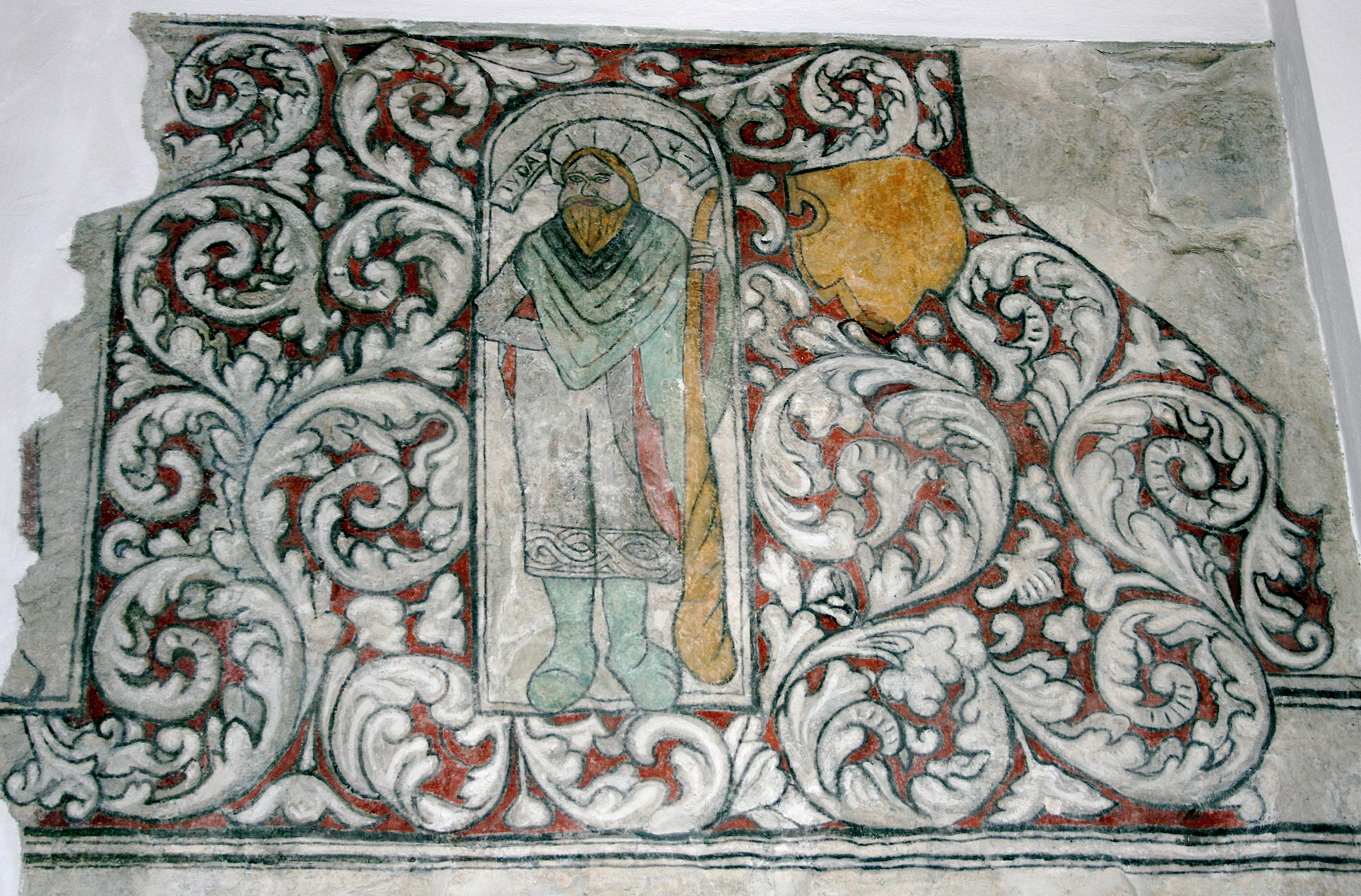
Old fresco

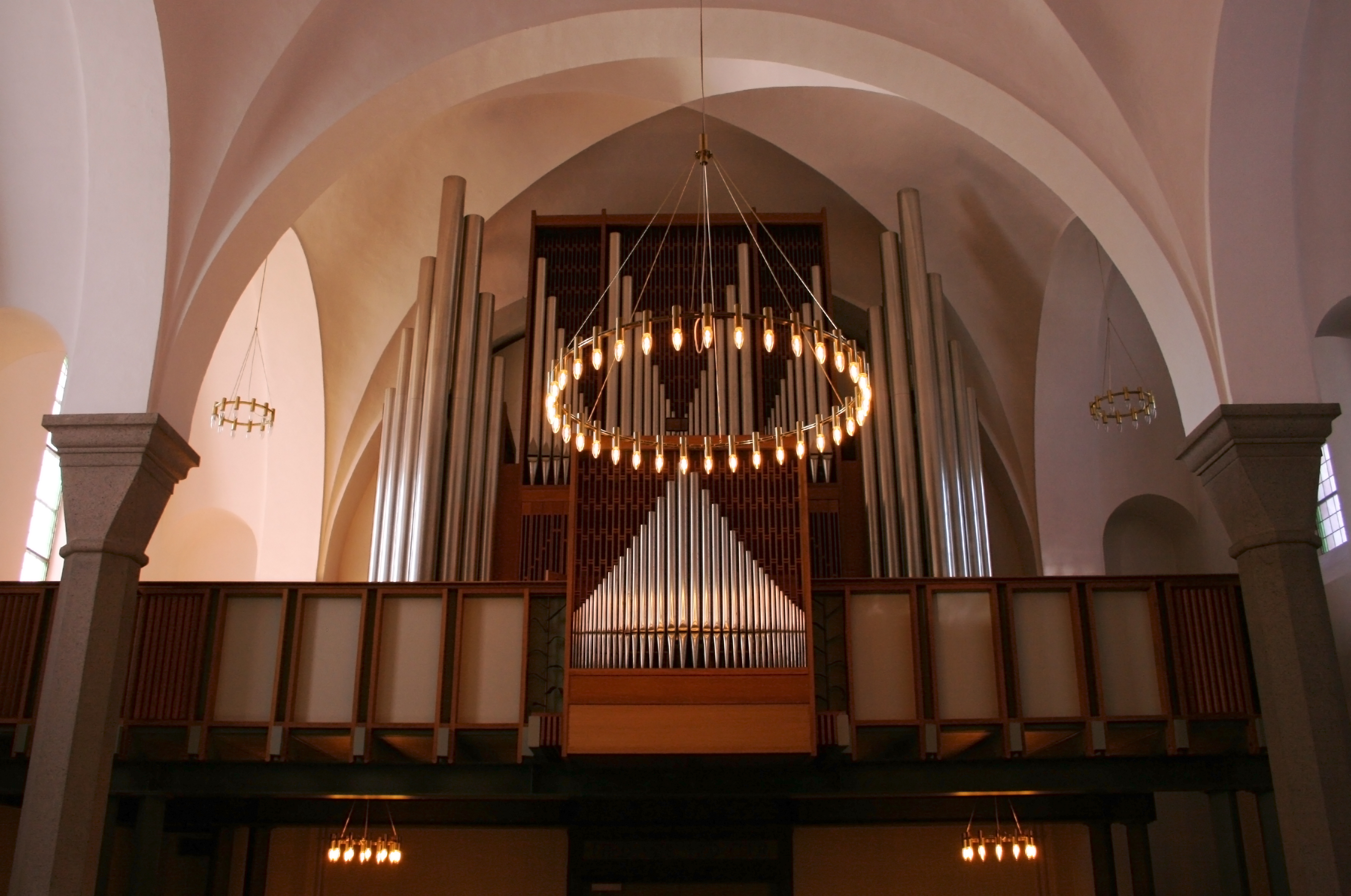
Organ

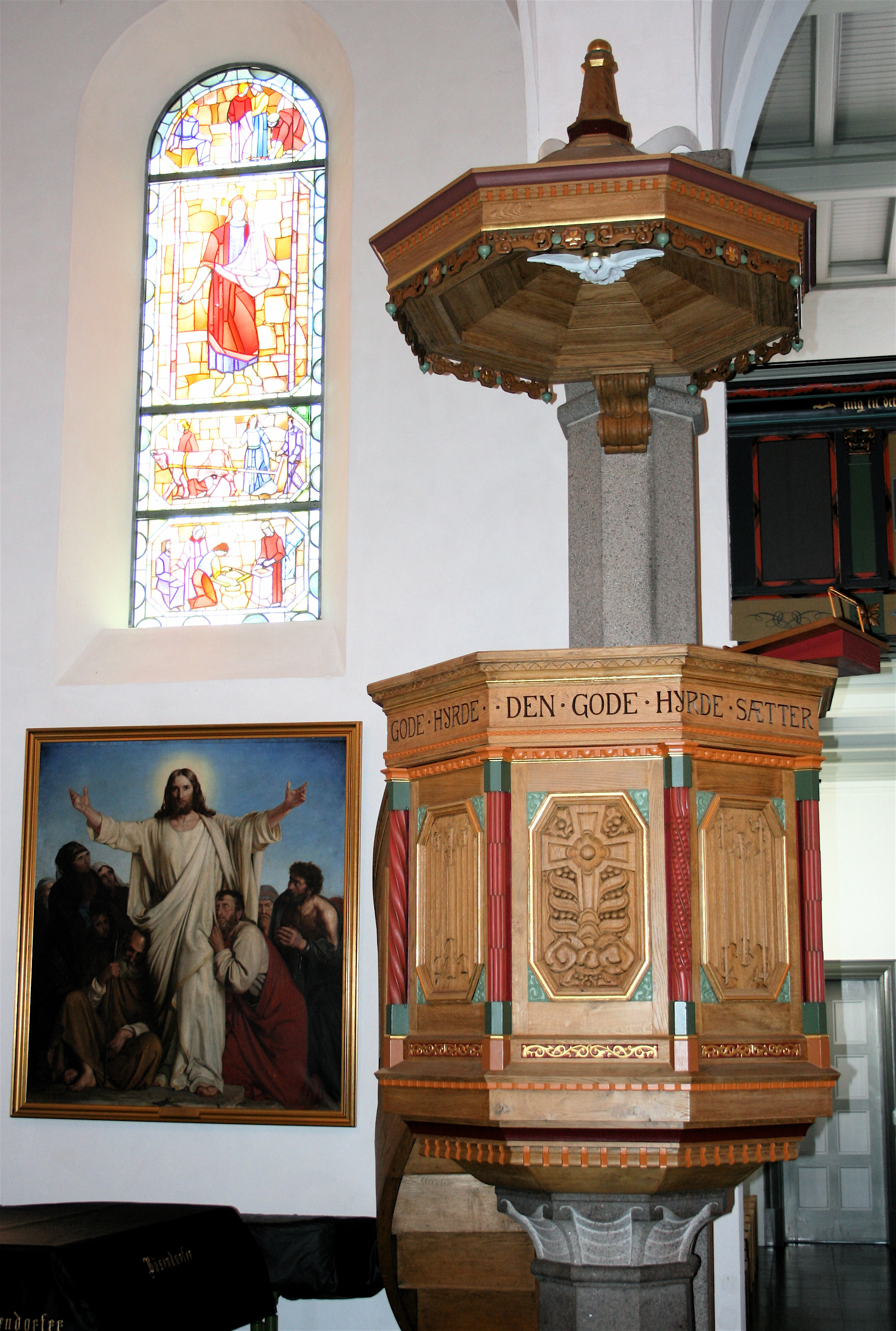
Pulpit

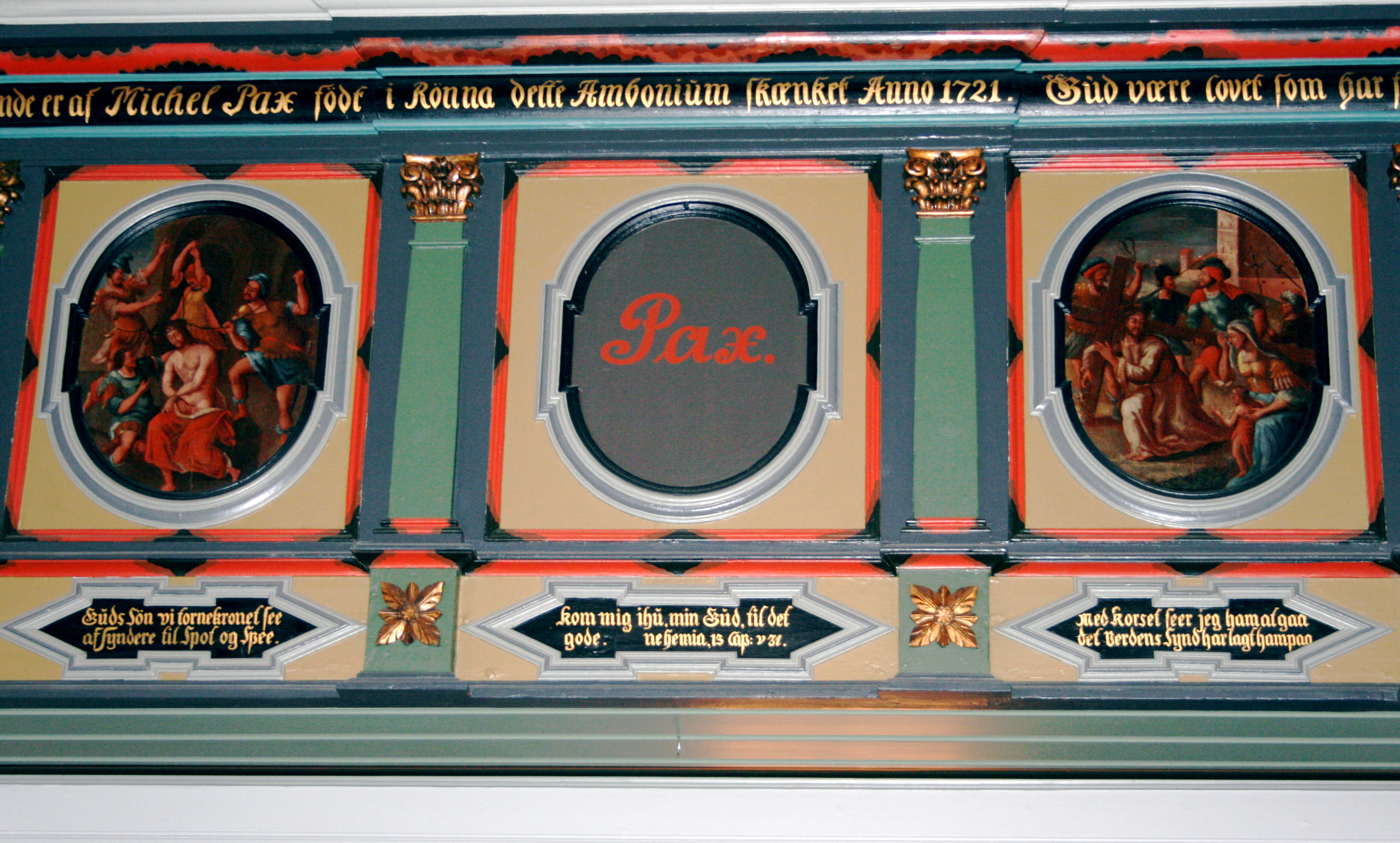
Gallery

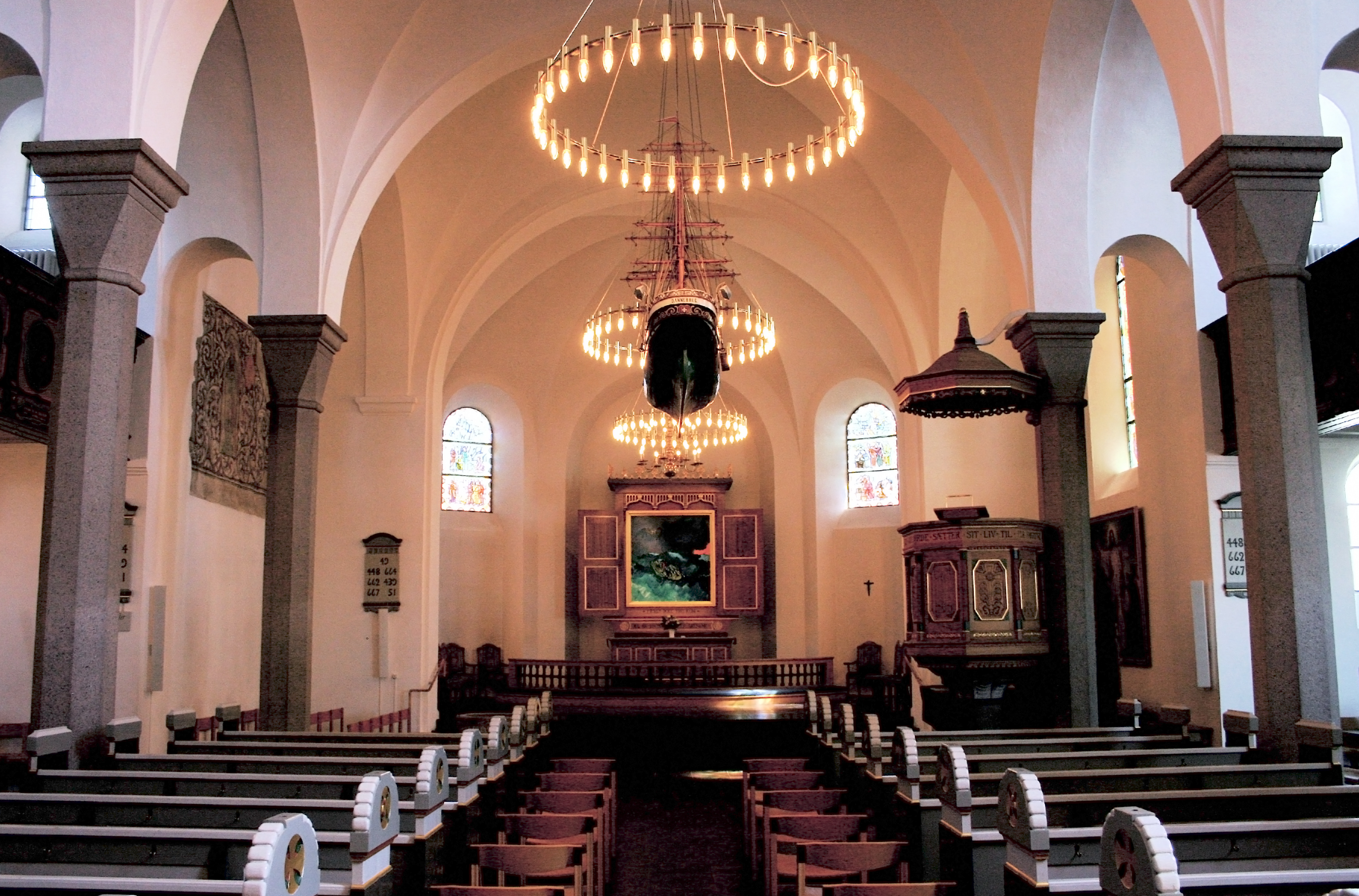
Nave

== See also ==
- List of churches on Bornholm
