= Gazmend Kapllani =

Albanian writer (born 1967)

Gazmend M. Kapllani
- Gazmend M. Kapllani; Γκαζμέντ M. Καπλάνι
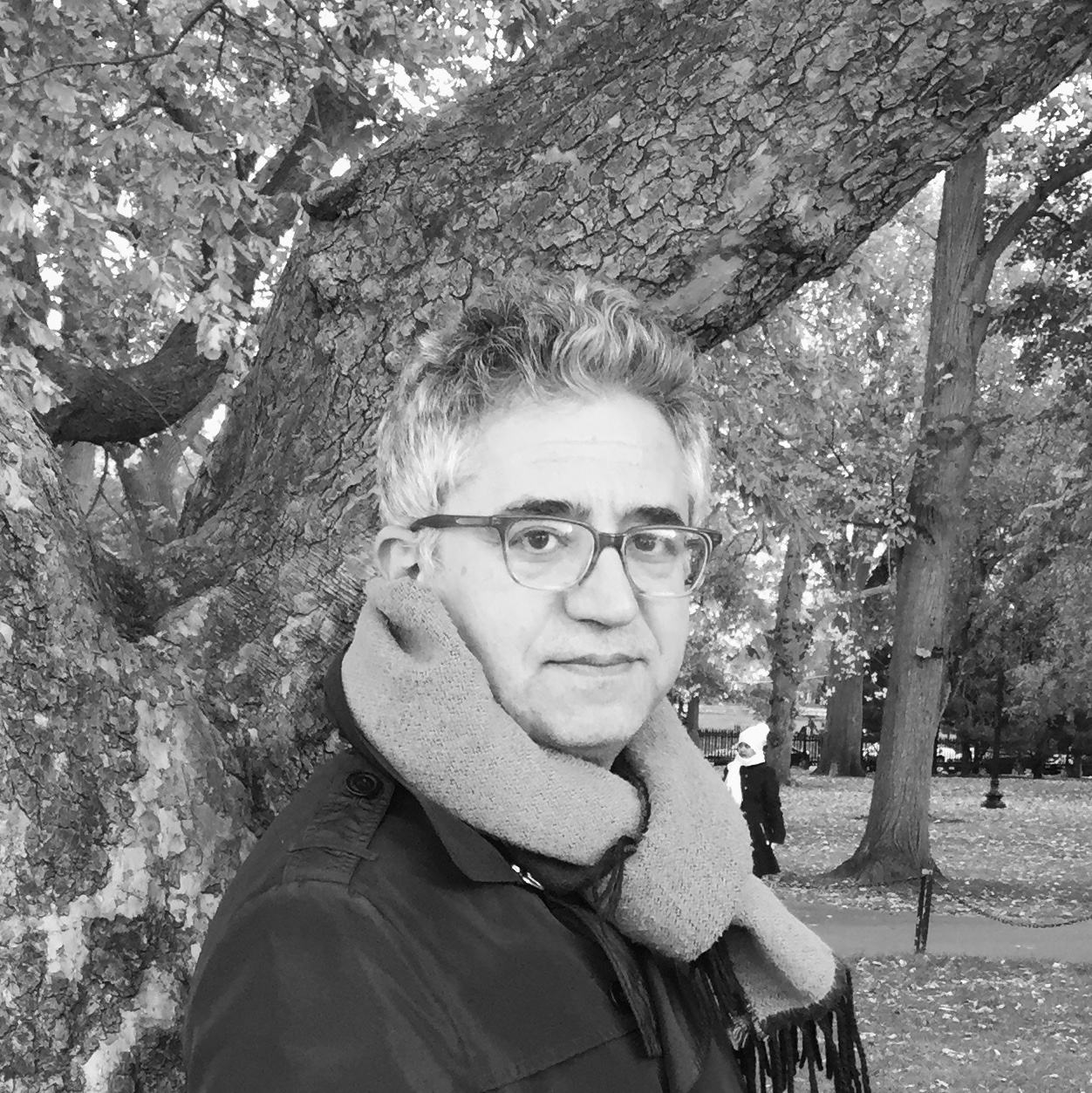
- Born: August 1, 1967 (age 59); Lushnjë, Albania
- Education: National and Kapodistrian University of Athens; Panteion University
- Occupations: Writer and journalist
- Writing career
- Notable awards: Letterature dal Fronte, Cassino, Italy, 2017
- Website: gazikap.blogspot.com

Gazmend Kapllani (born August 1, 1967) is an Albanian-born writer and journalist. He is the author of the best-selling novel A Short Border Handbook. He lives in Chicago, Illinois.

== Early life and education ==
Gazmend Kapllani was born in Lushnjë, Albania on August 1, 1967. The Kapllani family has been forced from their land and resettled by the Communist regime of Enver Hohxa. In 1991, as the popular movement against the communist regime started gathering momentum in Albania, Kapllani led a political rally in Lushnjë. After that, he had to hide from the secret police, and eventually escaped to Greece. Kapllani settled in Athens, where he graduated from National and Kapodistrian University of Athens with a B.A. in philosophy, and earned his Ph.D. in political science and history from Panteion University, Athens, with a thesis on the image of Albanians in the Greek press, and of Greeks in the Albanian press. In 2005-2010 he taught undergraduate and graduate classes in history and culture of Albania at the Panteion University, Athens. In 2015, after living in Greece for 24 years, Kapllani announced that he decided to permanently leave the country, citing systematic harassment by the rogue elements in the Greek police, threats from neo-fascist groups, and the refusal of the Greek authorities to respond to his application for Greek citizenship, filed in 2008. In the US, Kapllani was a fellow at the Radcliffe Institute for Advanced Study at Harvard, and taught at the Emerson College in Boston, Massachusetts. He now teaches at DePaul University in Chicago, Illinois.

== Books ==
In 2006 Kapllani published his novel A Short Border Handbook, loosely based on his own story of crossing into Greece in 1991. This bestselling novel has been since published in Greek, Albanian, English, French, and Italian; other translations are expected to follow. Kapka Kassabova wrote in The Guardian that "Kapllani's laconic memoir is cringingly funny, but it also shows the suffering of Albanians who crossed into Greece in the 1990s". Maya Jaggi praised the novel, writing in The Independent that it "...combines the wittily mischievous eye for absurdity of George Mikes's How to be an Alien with the philosophical insight of Milan Kundera”. The novel has been described in The Financial Times as "an unusual bestseller... adopted as an unofficial textbook in schools with immigrant pupils." In 2017 Kapllani was awarded the prize of Letterature dal Fronte in Cassino, Italy for the Italian edition of A Short Border Handbook. Kapllani's border crossing experience has been cited in academic publications dedicated to European migration. The French translation of his other novel La Dernière Page, the story of an Albanian writer living in Greece who returns to reconstruct the life of his father, published in 2015, has been awarded the literary prize of the Salon du livre des Balkans in Paris, France. The Federalist wrote about the English translation of My Name Is Europe, another novel by Kapllani published in 2017, that it "he advances an appeal for a united Europe."

== Journalism and theater ==
In 2001-2011 Kapllani has been contributing articles and editorials to the Greece's largest-circulation left-wing newspaper, Ta Nea, published in Athens. He has also written weekly columns for the Albanian newspapers Shekulli and Standard.

Kapllani worked with French-Moroccan visual artist Bouchra Khalili on a video-art project Tempest Society, focused on civic poetry and personal testimonies of refugees in Europe. It was shown at the art exhibition documenta 14 in 2017 in Kassel, Germany, and Athens, Greece.

Kapllani's play ΕΔΩ (HERE), directed by Yorgos Nanouris, has been produced in Athens in 2008. Aliens/Strangers, based on A Short Border Handbook, was produced by the Theater of the Deaf in Greece in 2013. Another play, also based on the Short Border Handbook, has been produced in 2014 by Rønne Theater, in Rønne, Bornholm, Denmark.

== Bibliography ==
- Mikro Imerologio Synoron/ μικρό ημερολόγιο συνόρων, Ekdoseis Epikentro, 2018, ISBN 9604588419.
- Lathos Xora/Λαθος Χωρα, Ekdoseis Epikentro, 2018, ISBN 960458877X.
- I keqi i vetes, ALBAS, 2018, ISBN 9928282137.
- A Short Border Handbook: A Journey Through the Immigrant's Labyrinth, New Europe Books, 2017, ISBN 0997316985.
- Breve diario di frontiera (Italian Edition), Del Vecchio Editore, 2016, ISBN 8861101445.
- Ditar i shkurtër kufijsh, NERAIDA, 2016, ISBN 9928227055.
- Petit journal de bord des frontières: Un vibrant témoignage sur l'immigration (French Edition), Éditions Intervalles, 2015, ISBN 2916355669.
- La dernière page, Éditions Intervalles, 2015, ISBN 2369560185.
- Je m'appelle Europe. Éditions Intervalles, 2013, ISBN 2916355847.
- I teleutaia selida / η τελευταία σελίδα, Ekdotikos Oikos A. A. Livani, 2012, ISBN 9601425624.
- Me lene europi / με λένε ευρώπη , Ekdotikos Oikos A. A. Livani, 2010, ISBN 9601421637.
- Mikro imerologio synoron / μικρό ημερολόγιο συνόρων, Ekdotikos Oikos A. A. Livani, 2006, ISBN 9601412263.

== Awards ==
- International Literary Prize of the city of Cassino, Italy, 2017 Letterature dal Fronte Associazione culturale.
- Literary Prize of the Salon du livre des Balkans, Paris, France, 2016.
