= Erichsens Gård =

Museum in Bornholm, Denmark

Coordinates: 55.1036°N 14.6977°E

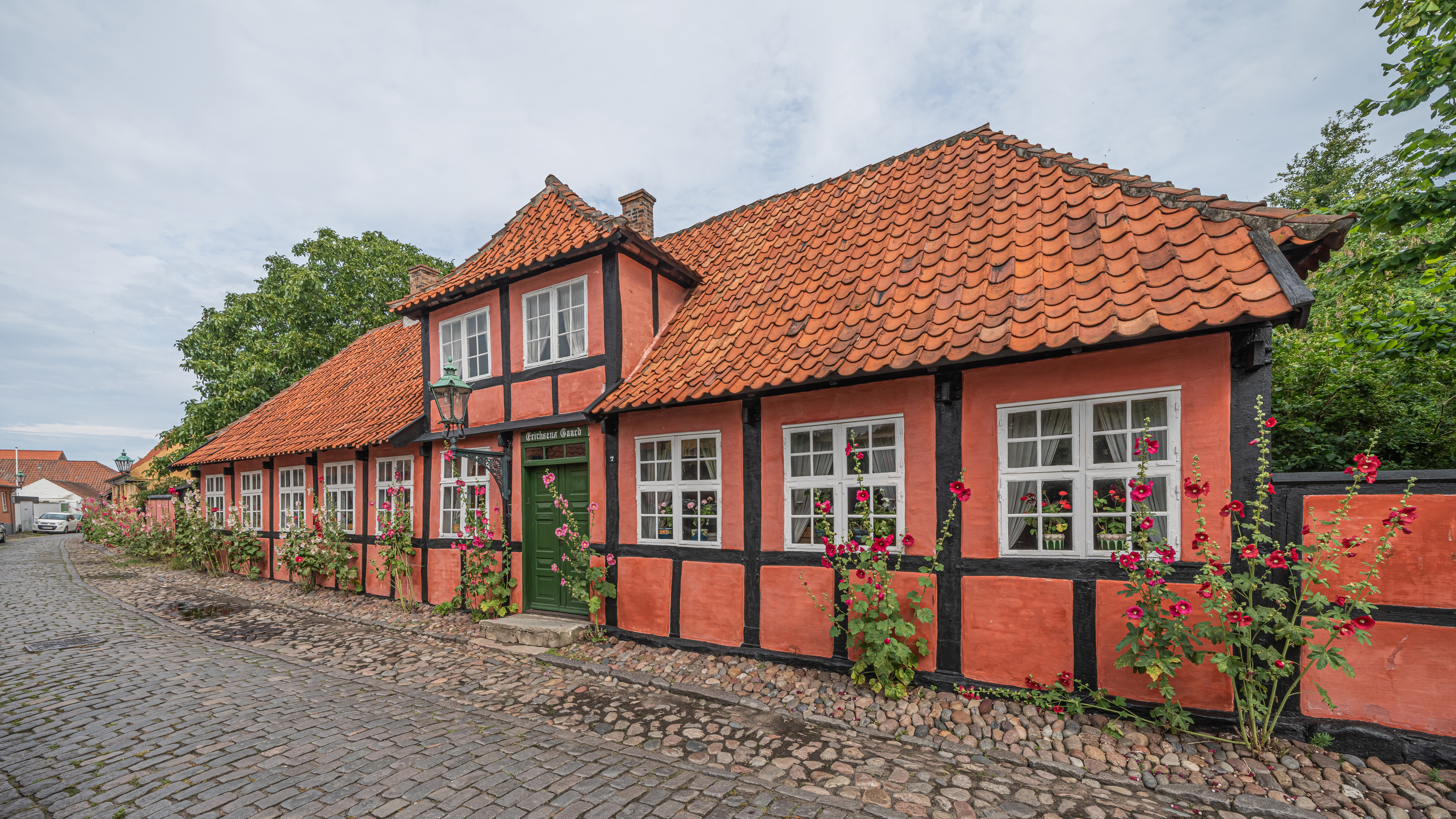
Erichsens Gård, Laksegade 7, Rønne, Denmark

Erichsens Gård is a timber-framed building located in Rønne on Bornholm, Denmark. It is now part of the Bornholm Museum and is Rønne's best-preserved commoner's house.

== History ==
Erichsens Gård was built in 1806 and expanded in the 1830s and 1840s. Surveyor and architect Henning Pedersen, who designed Rønne Præstegård and the old city hall on Rønne's Store Torv, lived there between 1816 and 1837.

Erichsens Gård is named after the next owner, Thomas Erichsen (1806–1886). He moved to Bornholm in 1832 and bought this house in 1838 and married Michelle Kathrine Westh (1812–1890) in the same year. They had 12 children, one of whom, Vilhelmine Charlotte Erichsen (1852–1935), became the muse of artists Kristian Zahrtmann (1843–1917) and Holger Drachmann (1846–1908). Zahrtmann painted her when she was fourteen years old. This painting is part of the Bornholms Kunstmuseum's collection. In 1871, Vilhemine married Holger Drachmann in Gentofte Church. Erichsens Gård still houses much of the memories from these artists as well as an exhibition about the Erichsen family.

Erichsens Gård became protected in 1919. It was sold in 1950 by Elena Erichsen to the Bornholm Museum.

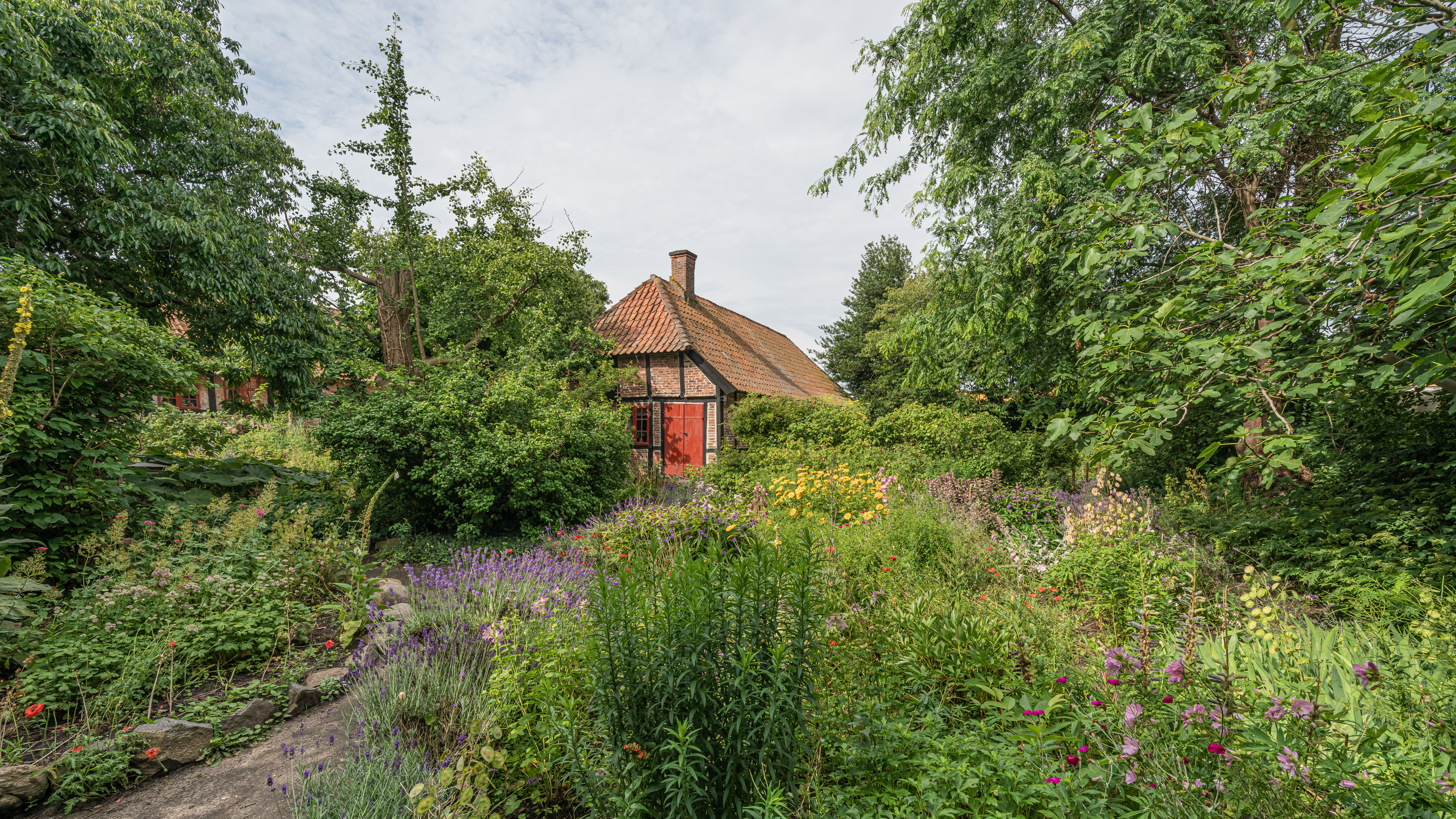
The garden

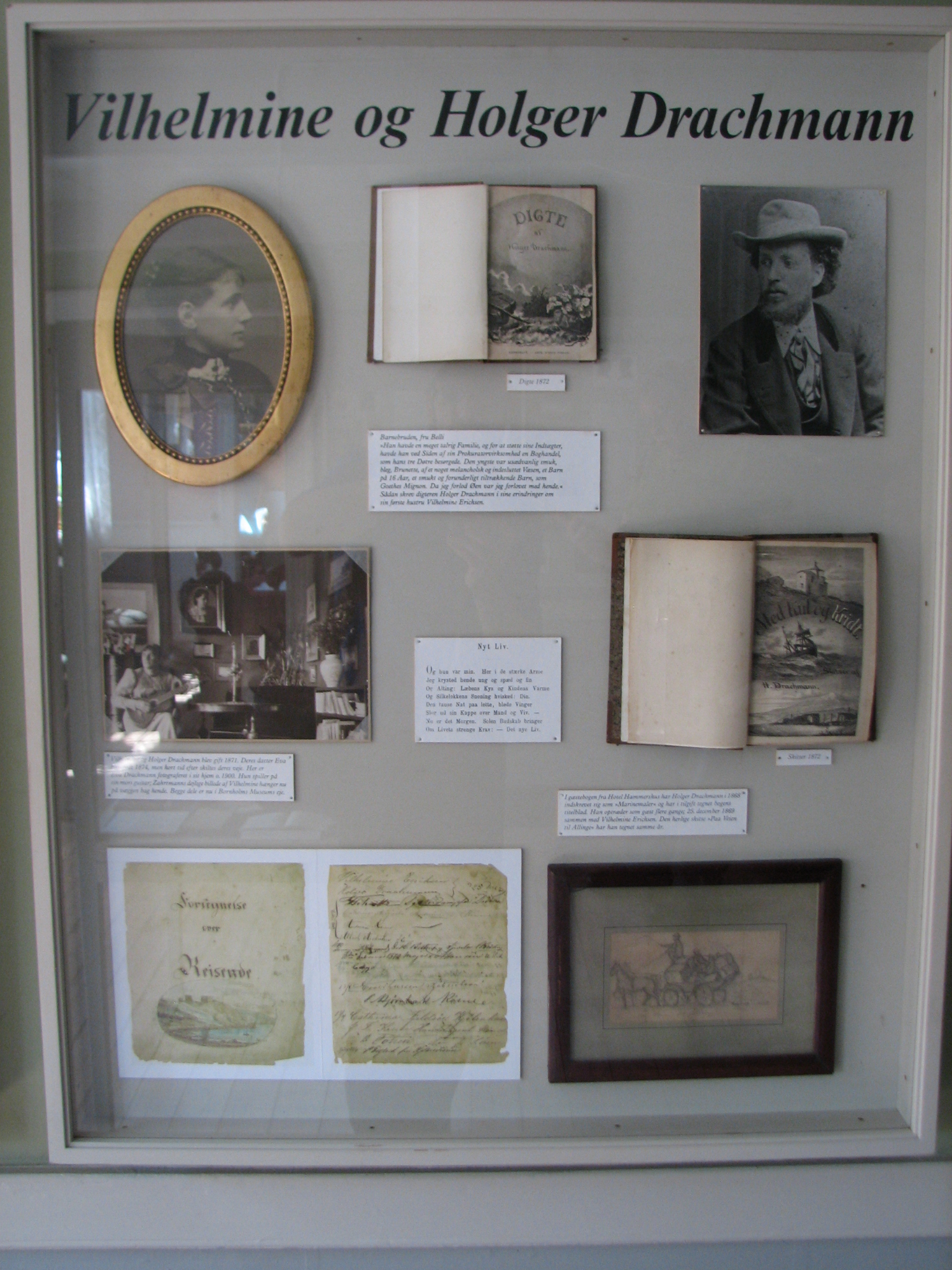
Vilhelmine Erichsen and Holger Drachmann

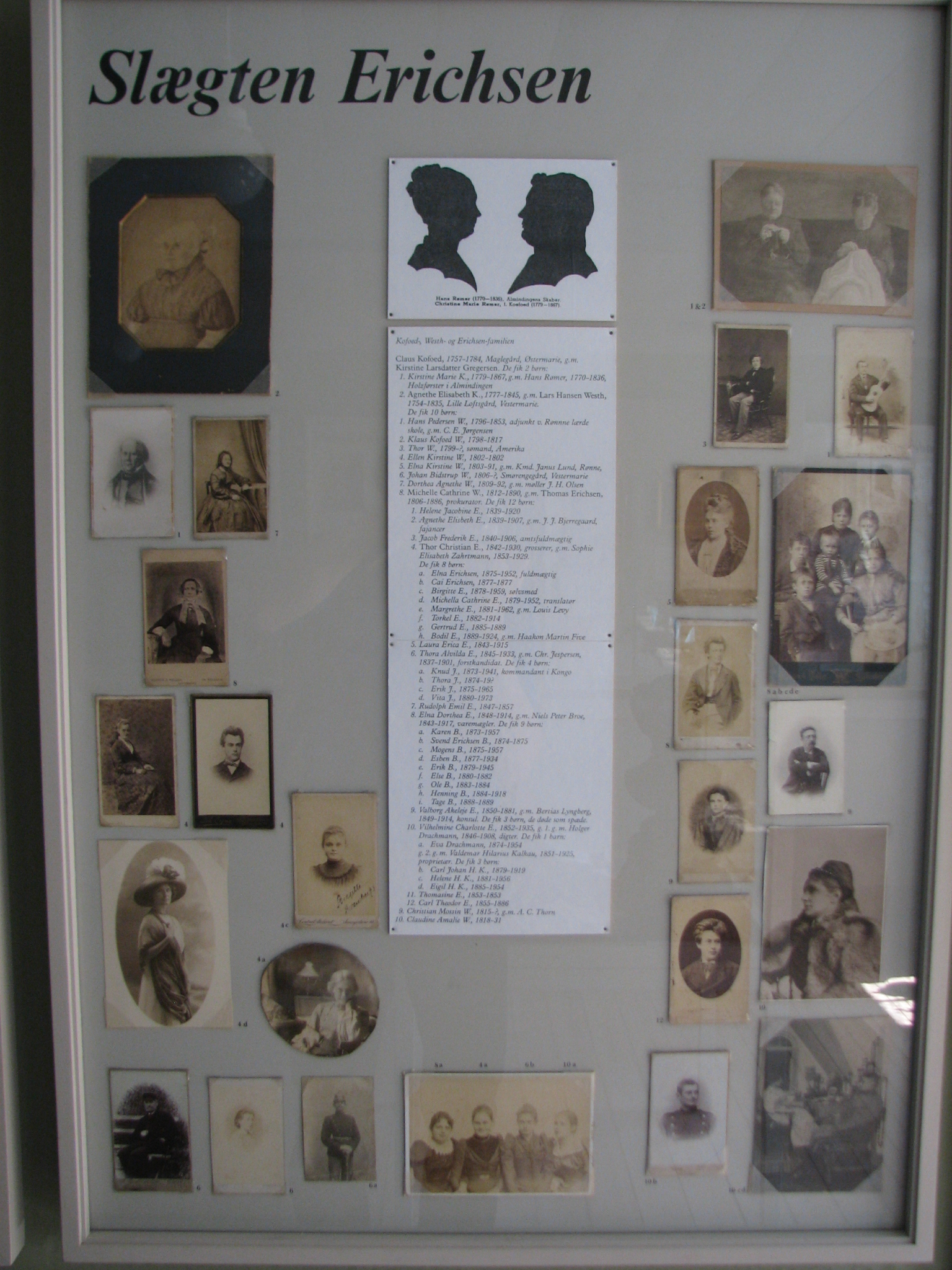
Vilhelmine Erichsen's family

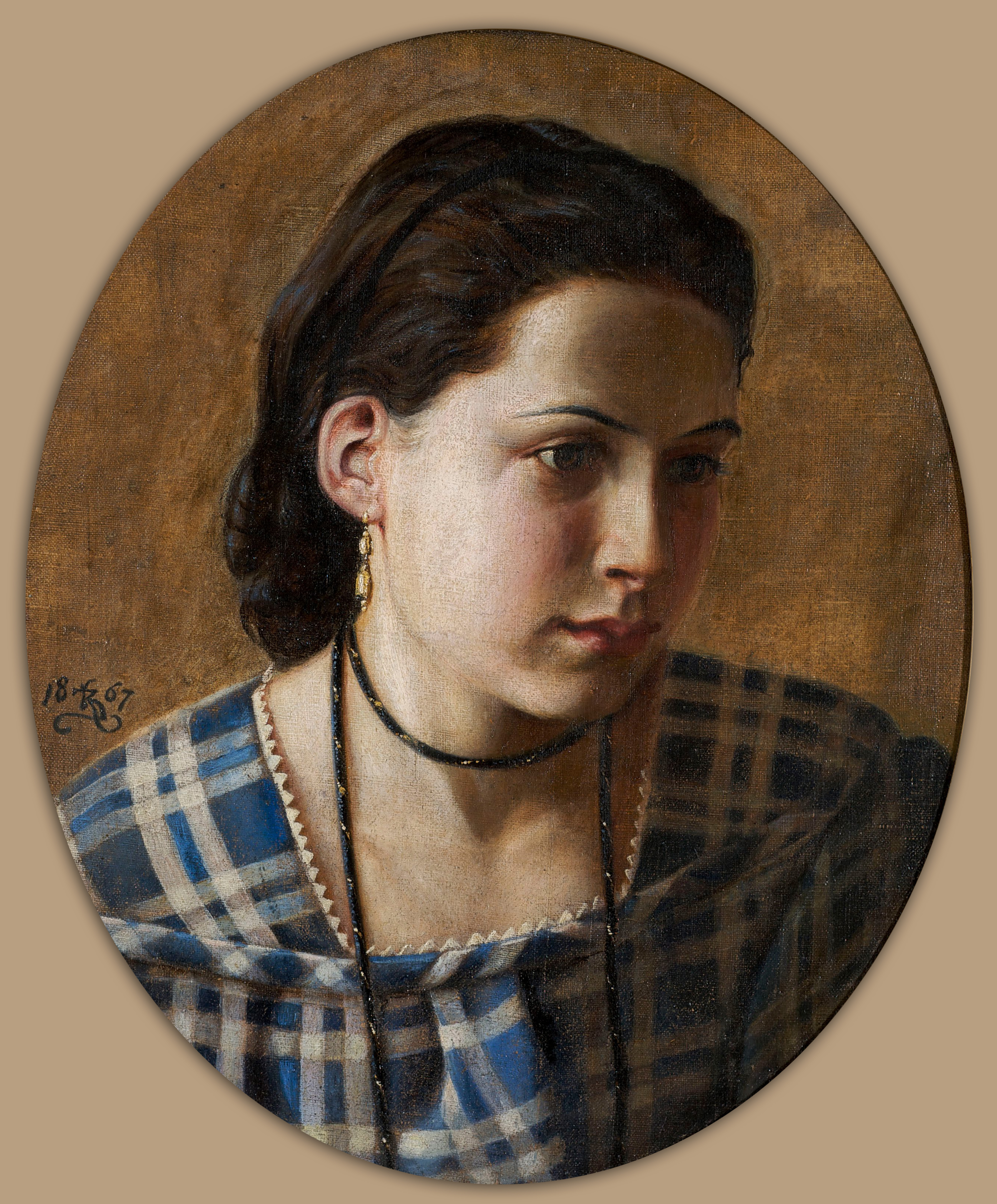
Vilhelmine Erichsen as painted by Kristian Zahrtmann

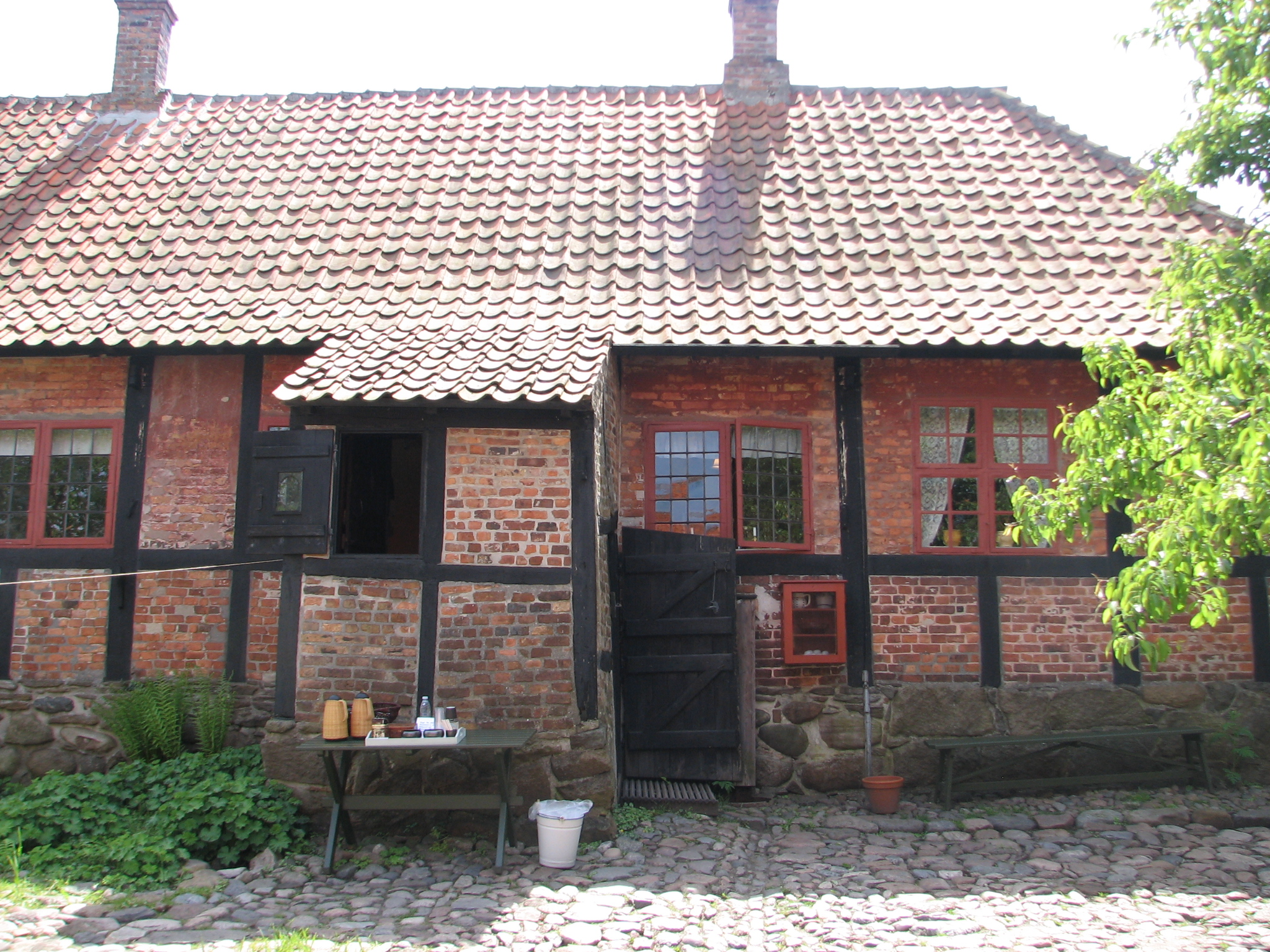
The courtyard and the back of the house

== Other sources ==
- Knudsen, Ann Vibeke (1990) Erichsens Gård i Rønne - Publisher: Bornholms Museum - Rønne - ISBN 87-88179-22-2 - Retrieved: 22 August 2011
