= Bornholm Museum =

Cultural history museum in Denmark

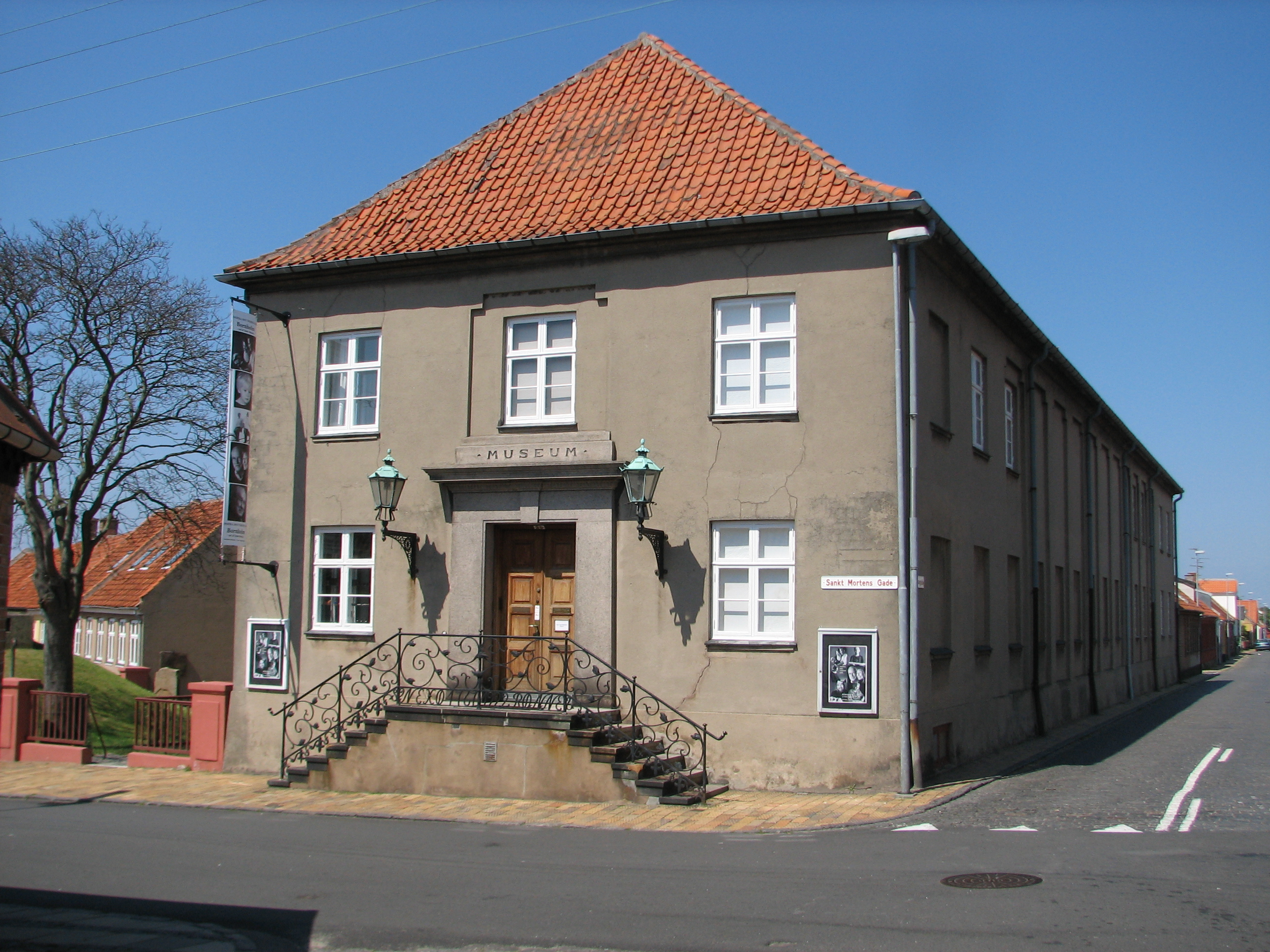
- Bornholm Museum in Rønne
- Established: 1893
- Location: Rønne, Denmark
- Coordinates: 55°06′09″N 14°42′11″E
- Website: bornholmsmuseum.dk

Bornholm Museum is a cultural history museum located in Rønne, Denmark. The museum collects, preserves, researches, and exhibits artifacts in order to raise awareness of Bornholm's cultural heritage.

== History ==
The museum's association was first founded in 1893. The museum provides a historic view of Rønne and the island of Bornholm, from the Paleolithic era to the modern age, including the history of occupied Bornholm during World War II. The museum also houses a number of Nordic Bronze Age and Iron Age artifacts relating to the island conducing.

The Bornholm Archaeological Research Center (BARC) is a research branch of the museum. BARC conducts archaeological surveys and excavations in the surrounding areas with the intent of disseminating and conserving Bornholm's heritage within the context of the wider Baltic Region. Each summer, BARC–in partnership with the Institute for Field Research–hosts a field school for university students at the Vasagård site in southern Bornholm.

== Notable sites ==
- Erichsens Gård - house known for its association with notable visitors including painter Kristian Zahrtmann and poet Holger Drachmann, who married the daughter of the house: Vilhelmine Erichsen (1852–1935).
- Hjorths Fabrik - terracotta factory founded by Lauritz Adolph Hjorth (1834-1912) in 1859 and in operation until 1993.
- Melstedgård- an agricultural museum south of Gudhjem. The property consists of an operating farm built in 1801 with farmhouse, stables and horse-drawn carriage rides.
- Kastellet - 17th-century citadel which now houses the Bornholm Defense Museum.

== Gallery ==
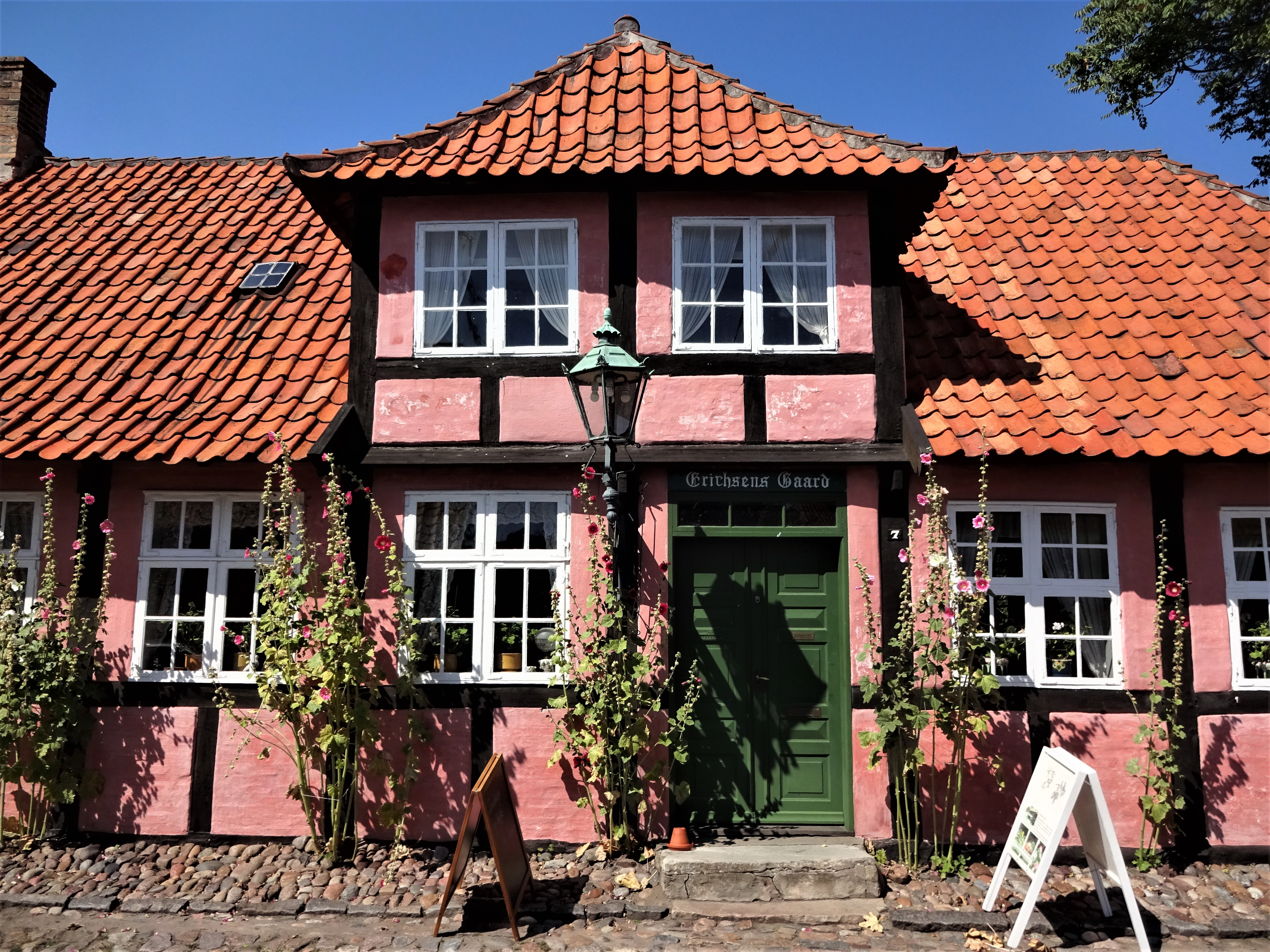
Erichsens Gård - house known for its association with painter Kristian Zahrtmann and poet Holger Drachmann,

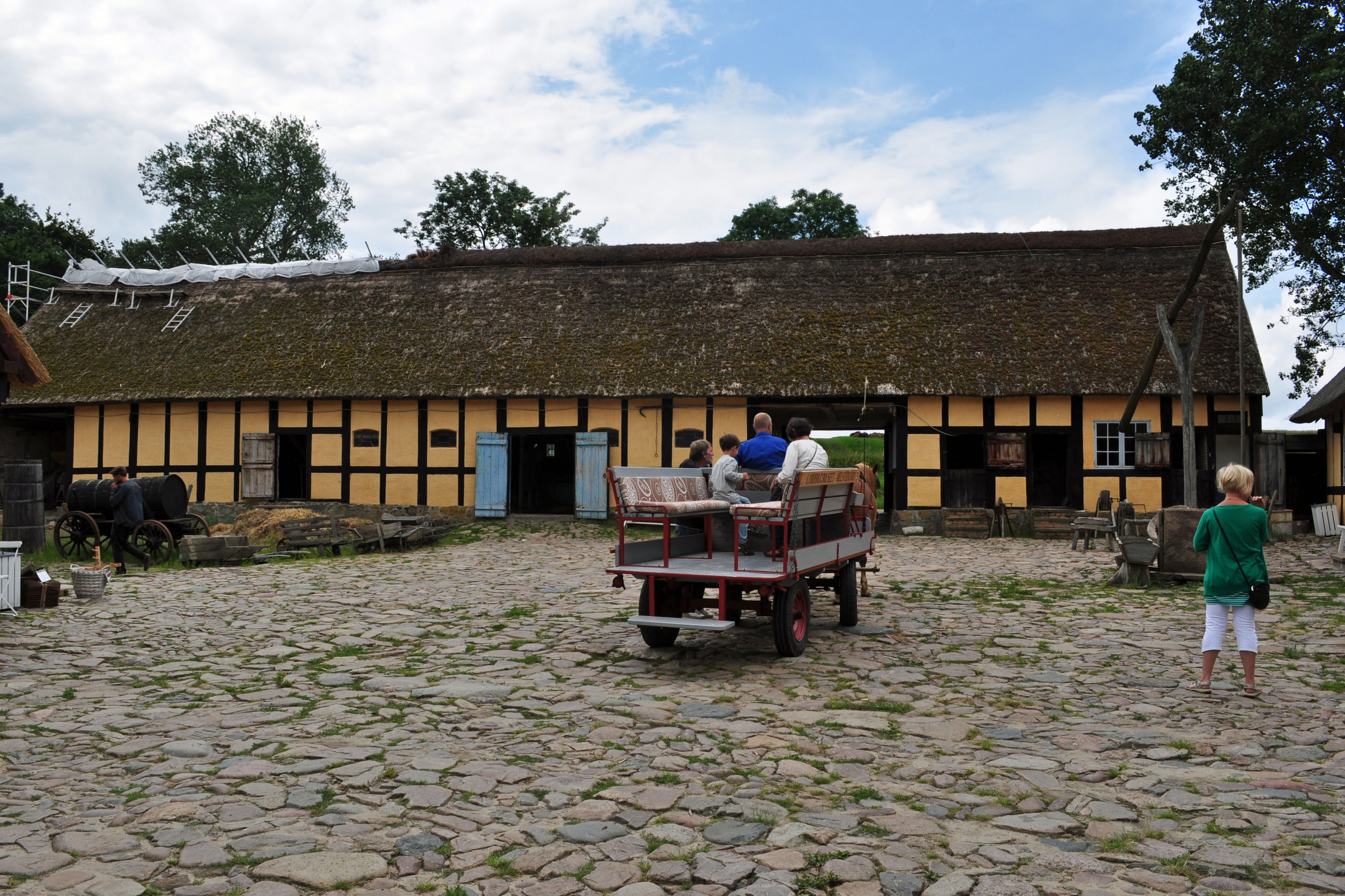
Melstedgård - agricultural museum south of Gudhjem

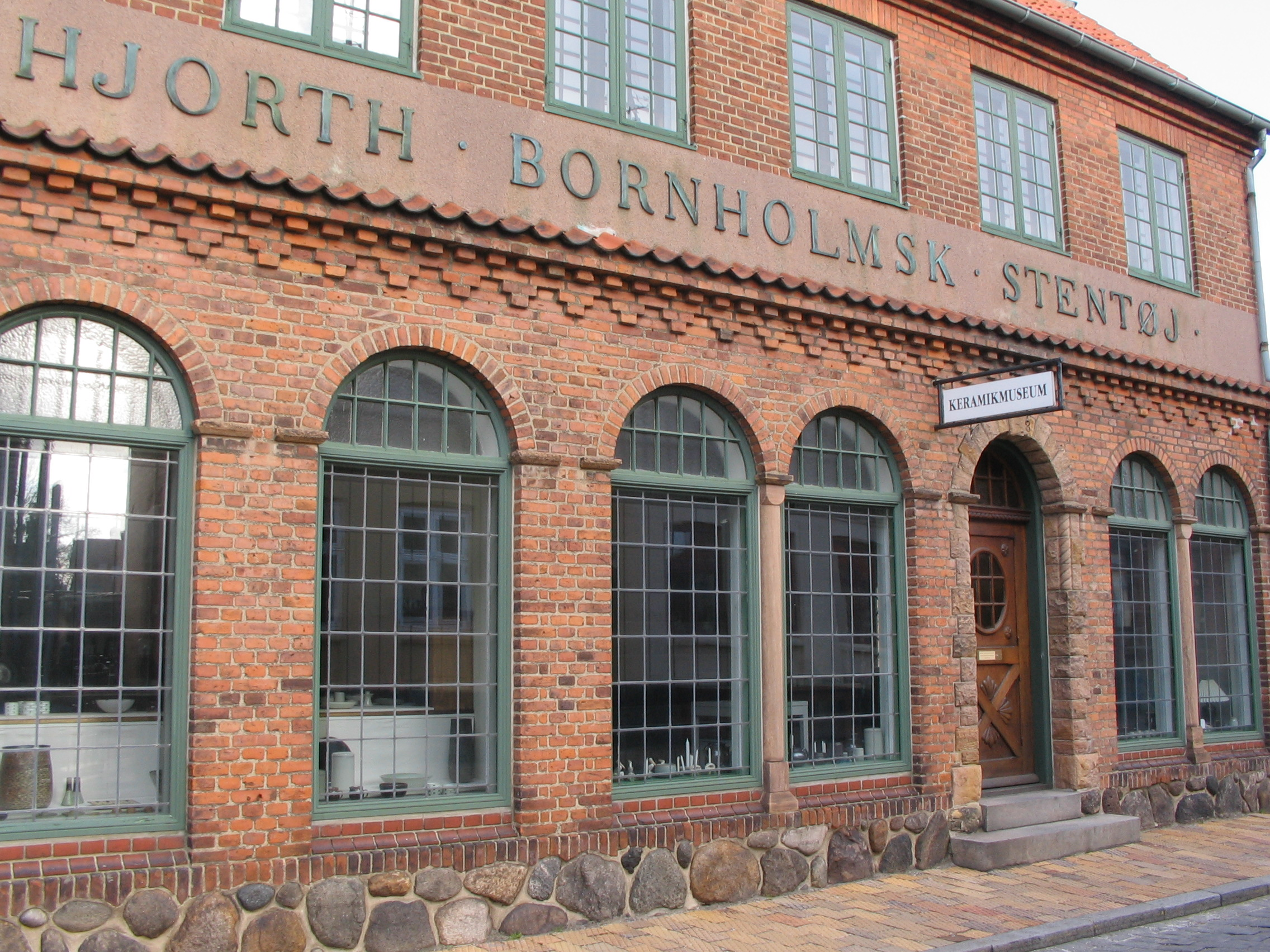
Hjorts Fabrik- former terracotta factory

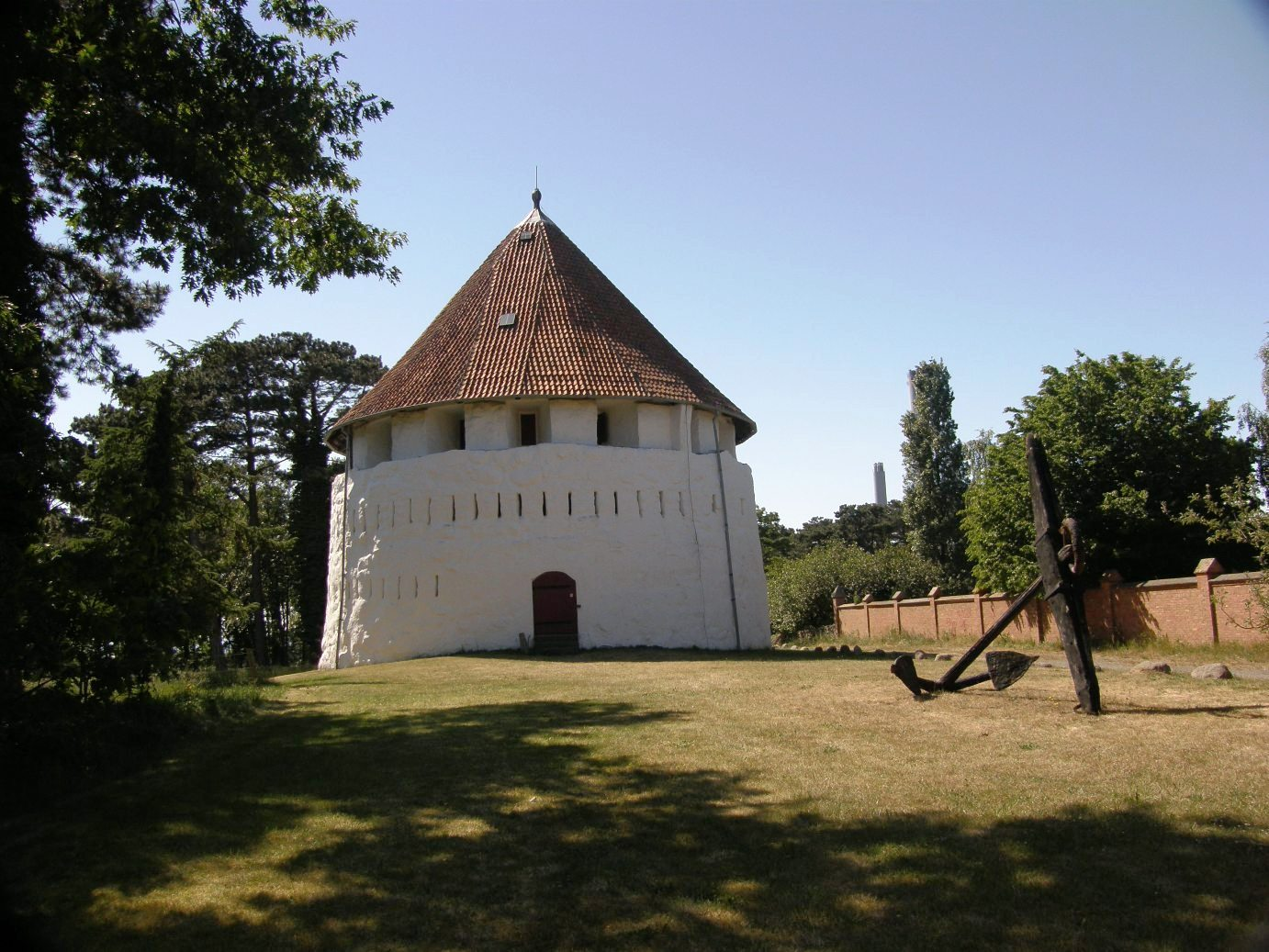
Kastellet - houses the Bornholm Defense Museum
