= Rønne =

Town on the Danish island of Bornholm

- Town
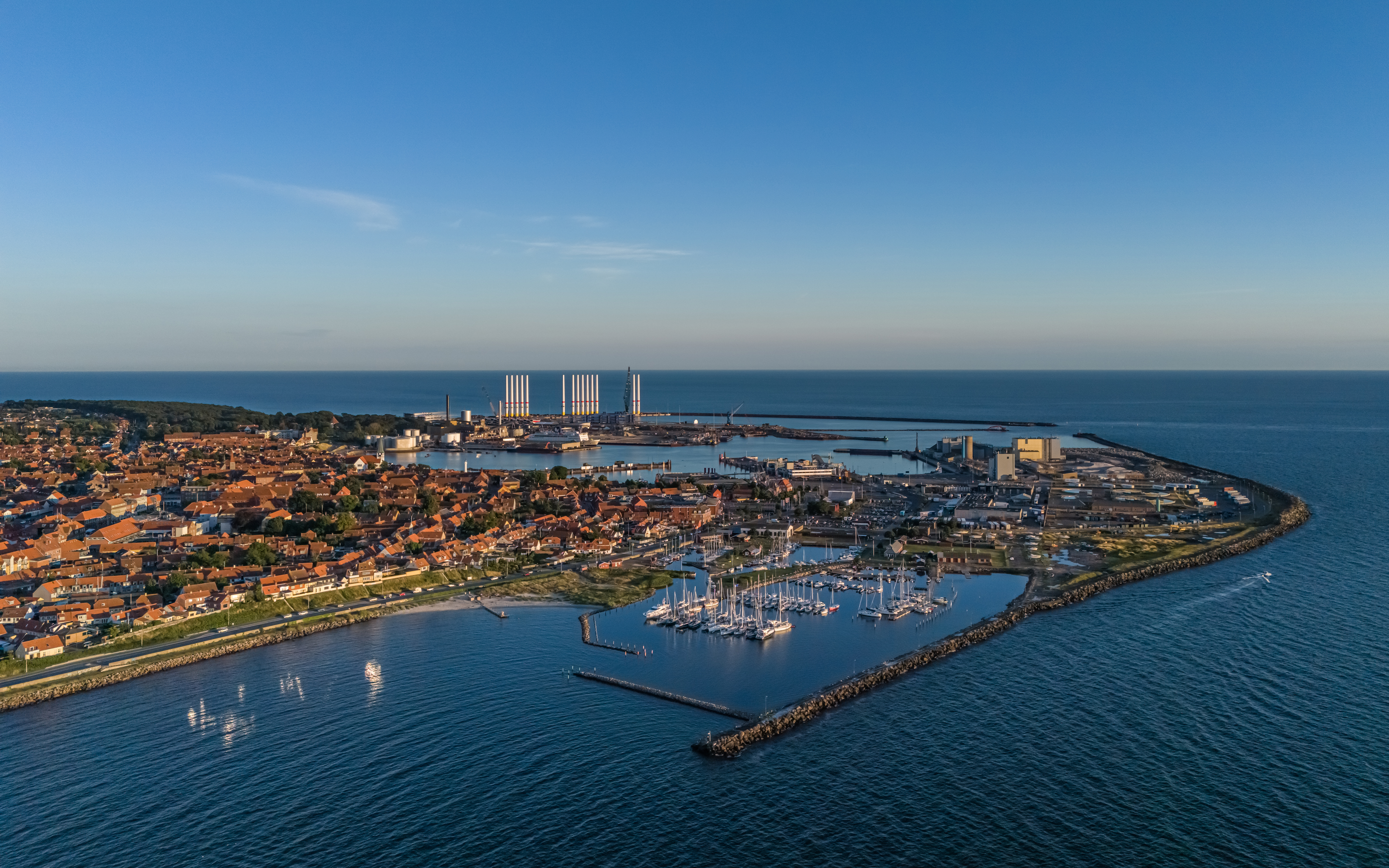
- Aerial view, 2024

- Coat of arms

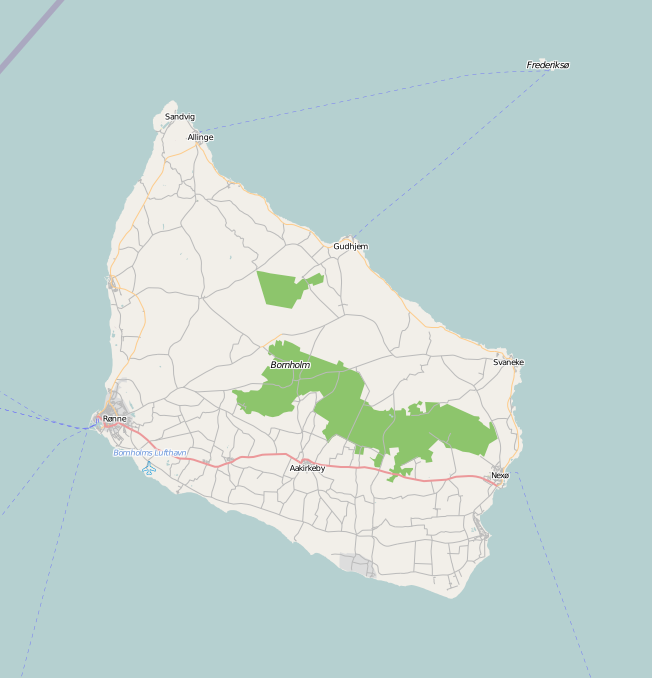
- Location on Bornholm Rønne (Denmark)
- Coordinates: 55°05′55″N 14°42′05″E
- Country: Denmark
- Region: Capital Region of Denmark
- Municipality: Bornholm
- Founded: 1327

Area
  - Urban: 8.12 km^{2} (3.14 sq mi)
- Elevation: 15 m (49 ft)

Population (2026)
  - Urban: 13,589
  - Urban density: 1,670/km^{2} (4,330/sq mi)
  - Gender: 6,549 males and 7,040 females
  - Municipality: 38,677
- Demonym: Rønnebo
- Time zone: UTC+1 (CET)
  - Summer (DST): UTC+2 (CEST)
- Postal code: 3700
- Area code: (+45) 56
- Website: brk.dk

Rønne (Danish pronunciation: [ˈʁɶnə]) is the largest town on the Danish island of Bornholm in the Baltic Sea. It has a population of 13,589 (1 January 2026). It was a municipality in its own right from 1970 until 2002, when Bornholm was a county (Danish: Bornholms Amt). It has an area of 29.11 square kilometres (11.24 square miles) and is the administrative centre of the Bornholm municipality. As of 2018, 11,539 inhabitants live in Rønne Parish (number 16 on the map of parishes), which is a narrow piece of land on the westernmost of the island and stretching north and southward comprising around a third of the area of the former municipality. Knudsker Parish (number 11 on the map) made up the rest of the former municipality. Not all inhabitants of either Rønne (statistikbanken.dk/(table) KM1: number 400-7552) or Knudsker (400–7553) parishes live in the city (contiguous built-up area) of Rønne.

Owing to its natural harbour and its strategic position in the Baltic Sea, Rønne has an interesting history coming under German and Swedish influence during its development as a herring fishing port. Today, with its cobbled streets, half-timbered houses and interesting museums, it attracts visitors mainly from Denmark, Germany, Sweden and Poland.

== History ==
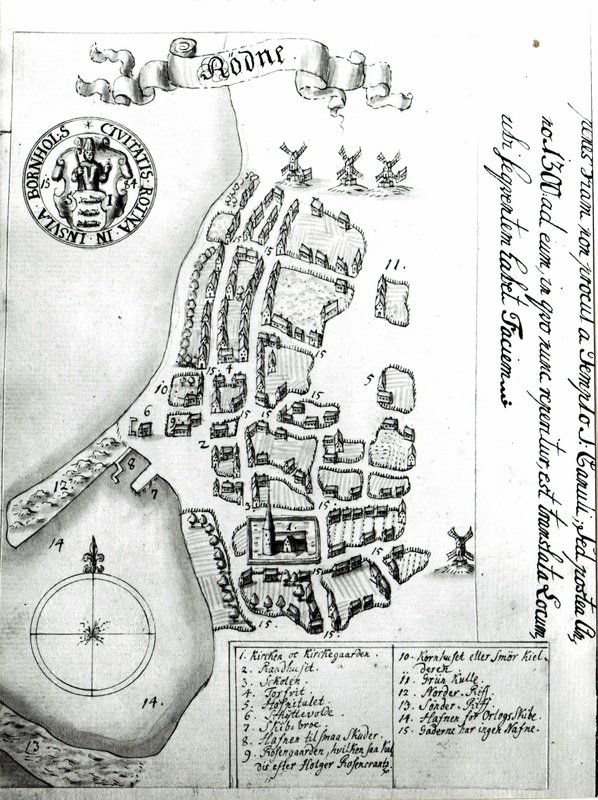
Rosen's map of Rønne, 1679

Rønne probably originated around the year 1000 when a small fishing community grew up around the natural harbour. Around 1275, a small chapel dedicated to St Nicolas was built on the site where Rønne's church now stands. The community was soon granted the status of a market town with its own mayor and council and its own law court. However, by the beginning of the 14th century, the King of Denmark, the Archbishop of Lund and even various north German princes were all competing for control of the town. The Germans took a special interest in Bornholm because of its strategic position in the Baltic Sea between the German coast and Visby in Gotland, off the coast of southern Sweden, at times establishing their own interests in the town. After the church's expansion in 1360, the parish of Rønne was established.

As its trade prospered, by the beginning of the 15th century Rønne was repeatedly plundered and burnt by men from Lübeck. In 1525, they took control of Bornholm as compensation for the large debts that Denmark was unable to repay. They even allowed their own merchants to establish businesses in Rønne. Though the Lübeckers contributed to the success of the fishing trade, they demanded ever-higher taxes from the local population. The citizens took revenge, chasing the Lübeckers off while allowing other German communities to remain. The result was that in 1576, control of Rønne returned to the Danish Crown. However, the Baltic Sea had by this time lost much of its strategic importance. The fishing industry declined and after the town was twice struck by the plague in 1619 and 1655, it took decades for it to recover.

A further setback occurred in April 1658 when, in the midst of the Dano-Swedish war, Denmark ceded Bornholm to Sweden under the Treaty of Roskilde. The occupation was however short-lived as the Swedes were overcome by the local population in December of the same year.

In 1834, Rønne Town Hall was built on the Store Torv, the town's main square. This important building was the centre of administration in Rønne and Bornholm for many years, and the island's courthouse and jail were there.

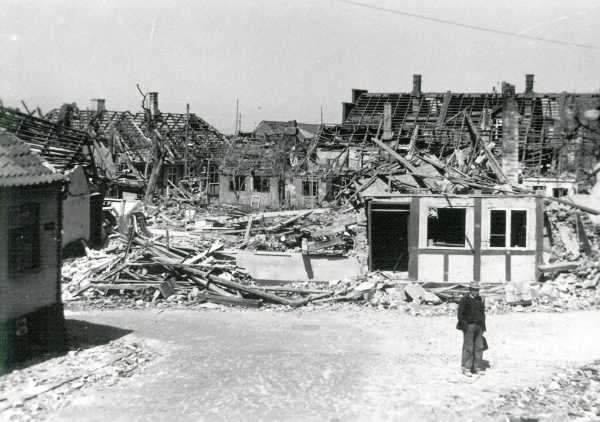
Soviet bomb damage in May 1945

At the end of World War II, on 7 and 8 May 1945, the town was bombed by Soviet aircraft when the commandant of the German occupying forces refused to surrender. The air raid destroyed 212 houses, but only ten civilians were killed, the population having been alerted in advance. Although the rest of Denmark had been liberated on 4 May, the Soviets occupied Bornholm on 9 May, sending the Germans back to Germany. The Soviet Union did not leave until 5 April 1946 when an agreement was reached with the Danish authorities, and the island finally came under Danish rule once more.

Most of the houses in Rønne were destroyed or damaged by the bombs and it took several years to rebuild the town, retaining its traditional architecture, quaint streets and half-timbered houses. The Swedes contributed 300 timber houses to the town while the rest of Denmark including Greenland and the Faroes raised the considerable sum of 8 million Danish kroner to help rebuild the town.

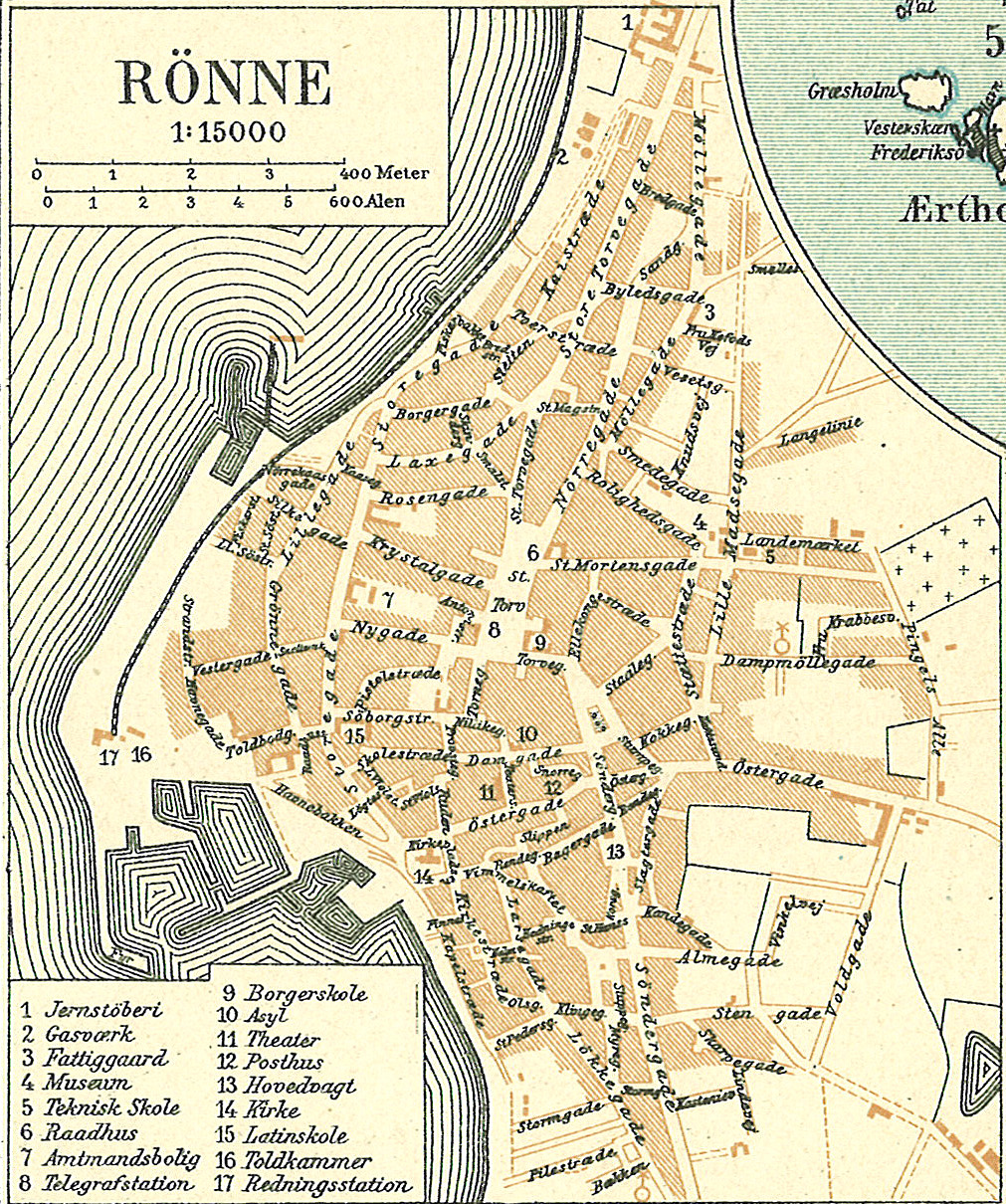
Map of Rønne in 1900

== Geography ==
=== Climate ===
Rønne's climate is a temperate oceanic climate (Cfb) with balanced temperatures year round. The island's climate allows local variety of common fig trees, Bornholm's Diamond, to thrive in the locality, lying far out of its normal habitats.

Climate data for Rønne (Bornholm Airport) (1991–2020 normals, extremes 1971–2000)
Month	Jan	Feb	Mar	Apr	May	Jun	Jul	Aug	Sep	Oct	Nov	Dec	Year
Record high °C (°F)	8.9 (48.0)	9.7 (49.5)	15.1 (59.2)	26.6 (79.9)	27.2 (81.0)	31.7 (89.1)	31.9 (89.4)	32.0 (89.6)	27.9 (82.2)	20.2 (68.4)	15.7 (60.3)	11.0 (51.8)	32.0 (89.6)
Mean daily maximum °C (°F)	3.2 (37.8)	2.9 (37.2)	5.0 (41.0)	10.0 (50.0)	14.4 (57.9)	18.1 (64.6)	20.7 (69.3)	21.0 (69.8)	17.1 (62.8)	12.2 (54.0)	7.6 (45.7)	4.8 (40.6)	11.4 (52.6)
Daily mean °C (°F)	1.6 (34.9)	1.3 (34.3)	2.8 (37.0)	6.9 (44.4)	11.0 (51.8)	15.0 (59.0)	17.6 (63.7)	17.9 (64.2)	14.5 (58.1)	10.1 (50.2)	6.2 (43.2)	3.3 (37.9)	9.0 (48.2)
Mean daily minimum °C (°F)	0.1 (32.2)	−0.2 (31.6)	0.6 (33.1)	3.8 (38.8)	7.7 (45.9)	11.9 (53.4)	14.5 (58.1)	14.9 (58.8)	11.9 (53.4)	8.0 (46.4)	4.6 (40.3)	1.7 (35.1)	6.6 (43.9)
Record low °C (°F)	−15.7 (3.7)	−17.7 (0.1)	−16.1 (3.0)	−7.0 (19.4)	−3.0 (26.6)	−0.2 (31.6)	4.0 (39.2)	5.4 (41.7)	−0.2 (31.6)	−5.7 (21.7)	−10.1 (13.8)	−14.1 (6.6)	−17.7 (0.1)
Average precipitation mm (inches)	40.2 (1.58)	22.8 (0.90)	30.6 (1.20)	30.2 (1.19)	31.9 (1.26)	44.2 (1.74)	47.1 (1.85)	41.4 (1.63)	55.5 (2.19)	50.2 (1.98)	52.1 (2.05)	42.4 (1.67)	488.7 (19.24)
Average precipitation days (≥ 1.0 mm)	9.2	6.8	7.8	6.4	6.1	7.2	7.5	7.0	8.6	9.5	11.2	10.2	97.6
Average snowy days	5.6	5.3	4.0	0.9	0.1	0	0	0	0	0	1.8	3.4	21.2
Average relative humidity (%)	88.2	87.5	84.7	78.9	78.1	80.1	80.7	79.6	81.6	84.7	86.6	88.5	83.3
Source 1: Danish Meteorological Institute (precipitation and snow 1971–2000)
Source 2: IEM

== Economy and infrastructure ==
The economic status of Rønne grew dramatically during the Middle Ages with the development of the herring industry. However, by the late 16th century, the fishing industry had begun to decline and for the next 300 years there was practically no further growth. The ceramic industry in the town surpassed that of the fishing industry and has continued into modern times, with as many as 50 ceramics shops in Rønne today. However tourism is now the most important contributor to the local economy: There are several notable sandy beaches in the area used by tourists.

=== Local heat and electricity production ===
The local utility company Bornholms Energi og Forsyning is located at the harbour of Rønne and produces electricity and heat.

=== Grandfather clocks ===
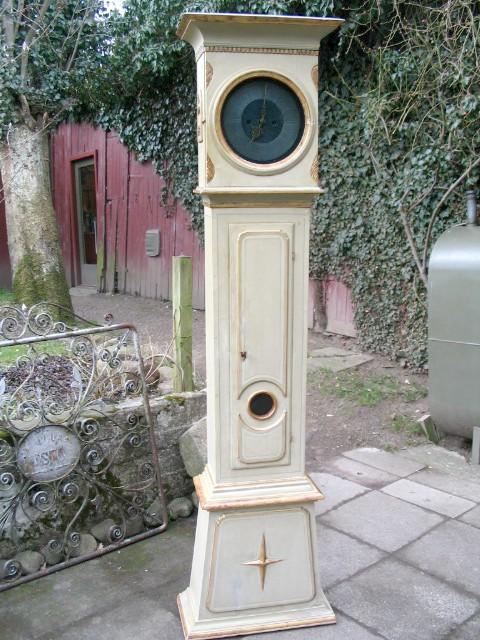
Bornholm longcase clock

Rønne also became famous for its longcase clocks or Bornholmerure which were manufactured from the middle of the 18th century until around 1900. Interest in clock-making started when a Dutch ship sailing from England ran aground off Rønne in 1744 carrying five grandfather clocks which were damaged in the accident. In view of the clocks' value, the sailors called on Poul Ottesen Arboe, a local turner, who was able to repair them. As a result of the experience he gained in the repair work, he was able to manufacture clocks himself, giving birth to a new local industry.

Several workshops soon began to produce Bornholm clocks which became popular as they were cheaper than the more authentic models produced elsewhere. There were probably about 30 different clockmakers in the town at the beginning of the 19th century. By the 1840s, some 2,000 clocks were made each year. Over the years, they were produced in various styles with both wooden and metal casings. The smaller pendulum clocks which were also produced became popular too. Around the end of the 19th century, production came to a halt as industrially produced clocks became far cheaper than Bornholm's handcrafted artefacts.

== Demographics ==
Historical population

Year	Pop.	±%
1965	15,957	—
1975	15,440	−3.2%
1985	15,343	−0.6%
1990	15,187	−1.0%
1995	15,220	+0.2%
1999	15,148	−0.5%
2002	14,837	−2.1%

Year	Pop.	±%
2010	13,924	−6.2%
2011	13,904	−0.1%
2012	13,887	−0.1%
2013	13,730	−1.1%
2014	13,568	−1.2%
2015	13,579	+0.1%
2016	13,639	+0.4%

== Landmarks ==
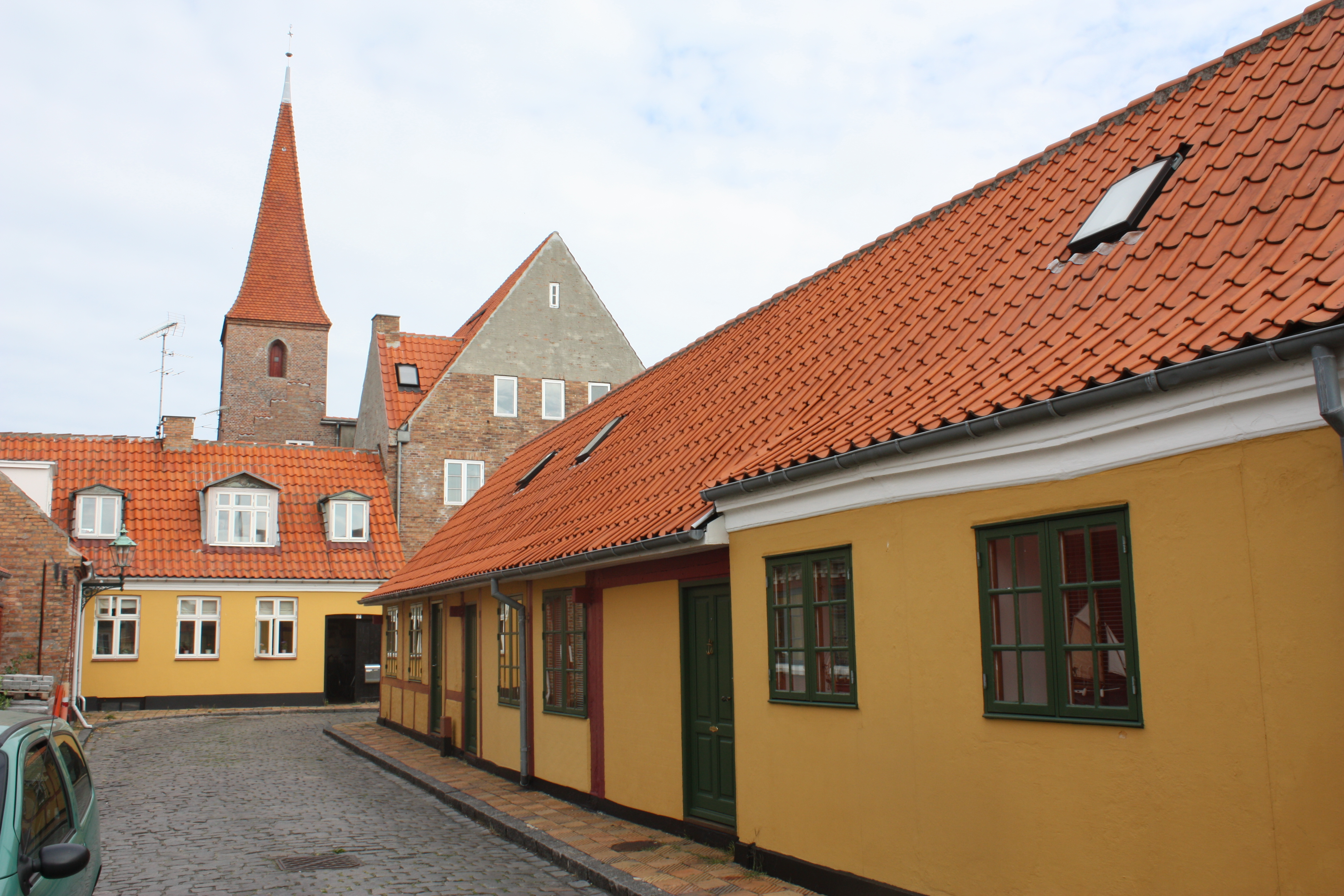
Rønne architecture and Methodist Church

The town has some quaint cobbled streets and low-timbered houses. Two streets of particular interest are the Laksegade and the Storegade, which contain many historic houses which were once the homes and trade buildings of merchants and noblemen. Notable landmarks include the Bornholm Museum, the Defence Museum (Forsvarsmuseet), St Nicolas' Church, the Smedegårds riding school in the southern part of town, and the lighthouse.

The Bornholm Museum offers an insight into the history of Rønne and the island of Bornholm, from the Paleolithic era to the modern age, including the occupation during World War II. The museum houses a number of Nordic Bronze Age and Iron Age artefacts relating to the island and has a Mjolnir, discovered in Bornholm but now housed in the National Museum of Denmark, as its logo. It also has a notable collection of Roman coins, pottery and paintings.

The Rønne Lighthouse, a slender white-painted octagonal tower in cast iron, stands on the waterfront not far from the church. Constructed in 1880, it was decommissioned in 1989.

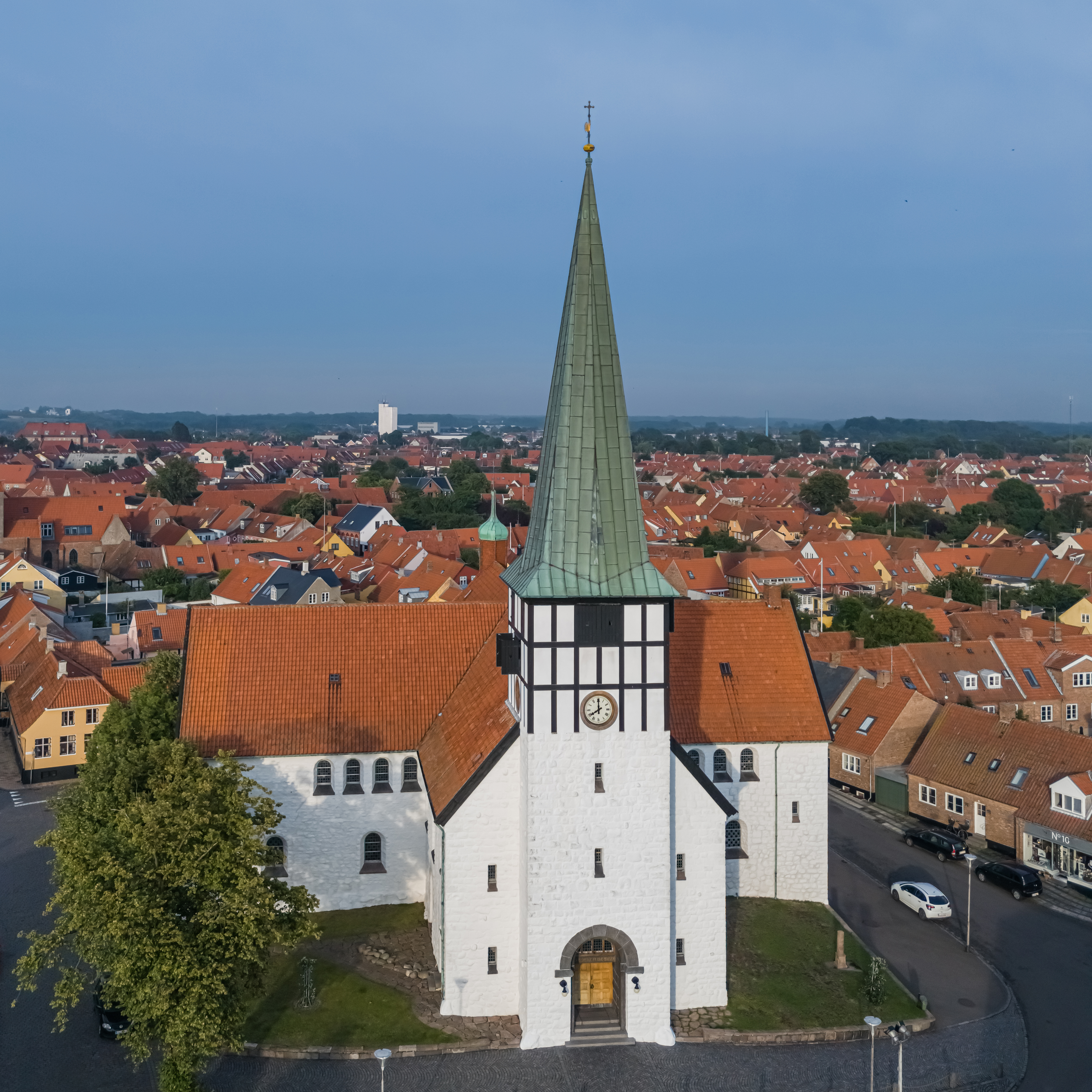
Skt. Nicolaj Kirke

St Nicolas's Church, with its distinctive tower, is part of the Diocese of Copenhagen and in its present form was enlarged and fully refurbished in 1918. It stands on the site of an earlier church or chapel from the 13th century of which some sections can still be seen. Forsvarsmuseet, or the Rønne Defence Museum, is housed in a round tower with walls 3.5 m (11 feet) thick known as Kastellet or the citadel. Built in 1744 for the town's defence, there was never any occasion for it to be used. The museum has numerous artefacts relating to military history such as guns, blades, bombs and uniforms. Store Torv, the central square, was formerly used for military parades. Several notable buildings lie in the heart of the town, including the Rønne Public Library, the Nordeabank and old merchant/noble warehouses and residences. Buildings of note include Erichsens Gård, built in 1806 and now a museum, the neo-classical Kommandantgården, built in 1846 and now a ceramics museum, and the Amtmandsgården, located at Storegade 36. The Toldboden is a merchant warehouse, built in 1624, and is one of Rønne's oldest half-timbered buildings. The Torhus building, at the side of the square, was built in 1834 and is the former town hall, courthouse and jail. Rønne Theatre built in 1823 is Denmark's oldest provincial theatre still in active use. Hovedvagten at Søndergade 12 was built as a guard house in 1744 with bricks from Hammershus which was being demolished at the time. It is the oldest brick house in the town. The Methodist Church with another distinctive tower was built 1917–1918 and consecrated 6 January 1918. Another sightworthy building in the centre of Rønne is the Baptist Church which was built in 1888.

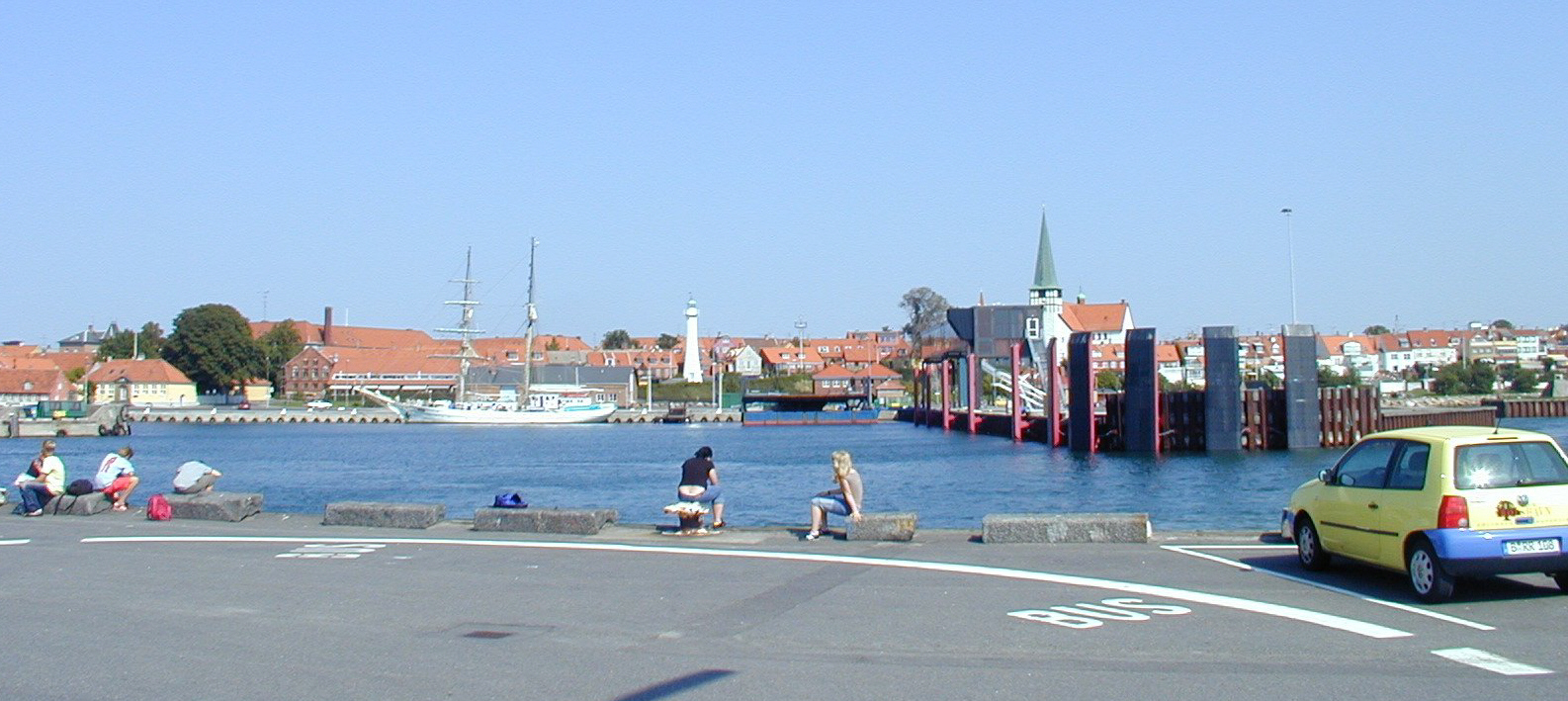
Rønne harbor

== Transportation ==
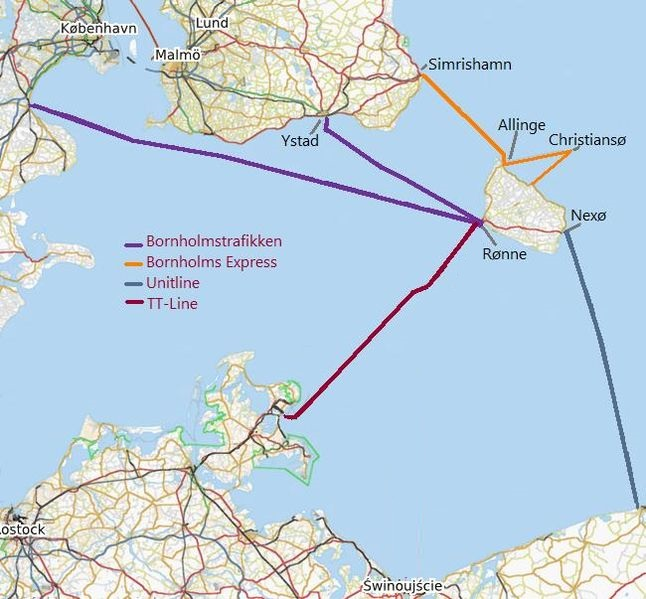
Ferry routes connecting Bornholm

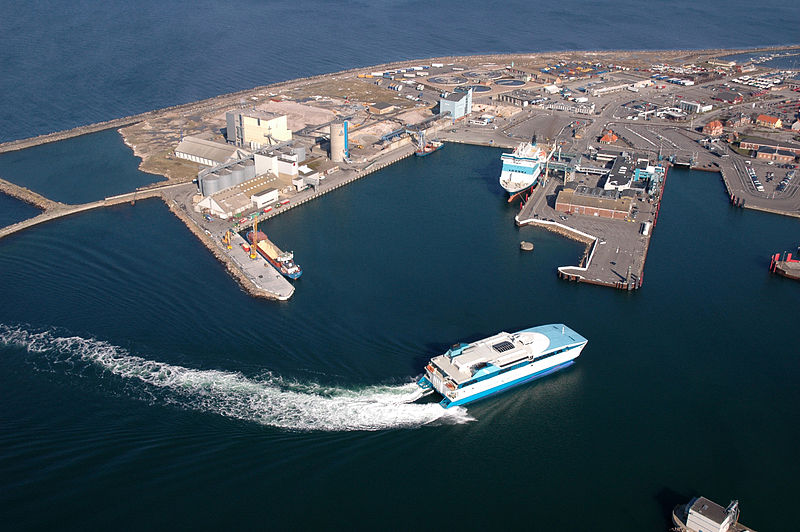
Rønne Havn with HSC Villum Clausen

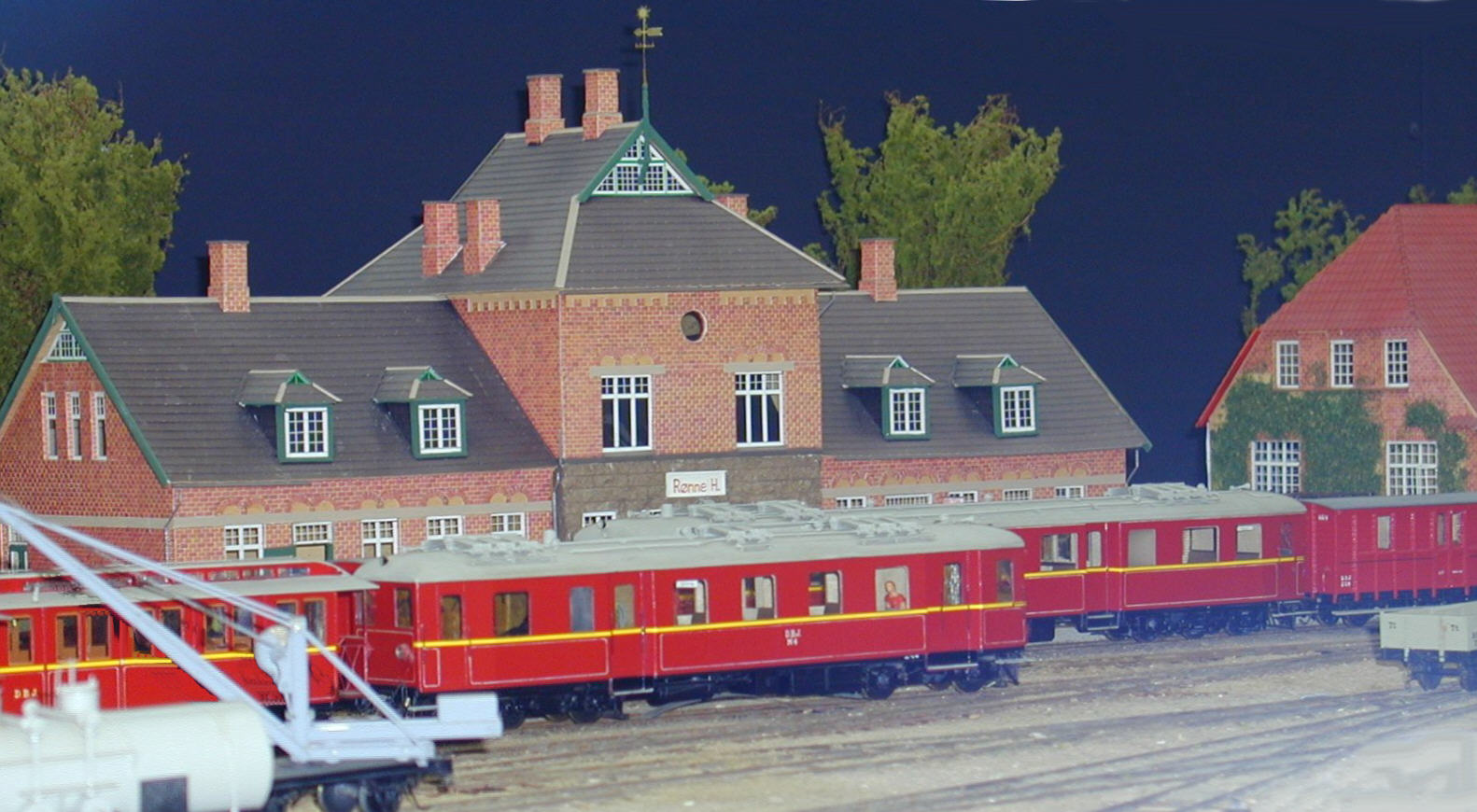
Rønne Railway Station model in Bornholm Museum

Rønne is connected to the rest of Denmark and to the outside world by ferry lines. Bornholmslinjen operates the lines to Køge, Ystad and Sassnitz, while Polferries operates the line to Świnoujście.

There is a high speed catamaran link to Ystad which connects with a direct train link between Ystad and Copenhagen.

Outside Rønne, Bornholm Airport offers flights to Copenhagen and to some summer destinations.

== Twin towns – sister cities ==
Darlowo, Poland; Høyanger, Norway; Karlshamn, Sweden; Kuressaare, Estonia; Mänttä, Finland; Neustadt, Germany	Ronneby, Sweden; Simrishamn, Sweden; Sölvesborg, Sweden; Władysławowo, Poland; Wolgast, Germany

== Bibliography ==
- Bender, A; O'Brien. S. (2005). Lonely Planet Denmark. Lonely Planet. pp. 168–71. ISBN 1-74059-489-4. "Rønne bombing."
