= Rønne Theater =

Theatre in Rønne, Denmark

Coordinates: 55°05′59″N 14°41′57″E

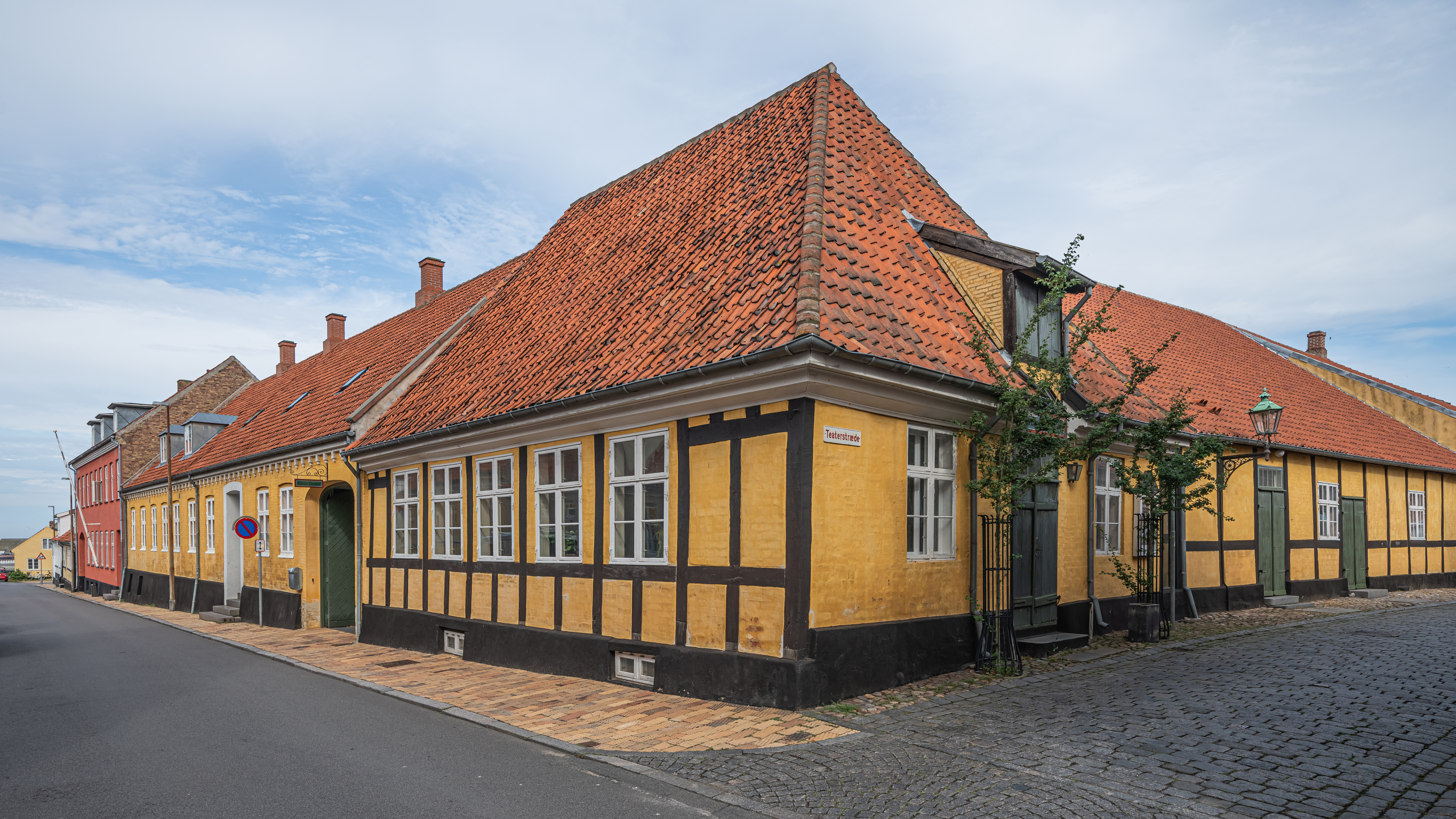
Rønne Theater

Rønne Theater, also Bornholms Teater, is a theatre in Rønne, Bornholm, Denmark. It is located on the corner of Teaterstræde (Theater Alley) and Østergade (East Street) in a half-timbered yellow and brown painted house with a red tiled roof. The building, dating from 1783, was expanded into a theatre in 1823, making it Denmark's oldest provincial theatre still in active use. Rønne Theater is a venue for amateur plays and opera as well as cabaret performances. It became a listed building in 1938.

In early 2001, extensive restoration work was carried out by the Aarhus firm, Exners Tegnestue. With new seating and a new foyer, the Baroque style auditorium now accommodates an audience of 302. The theatre's performances attract some 25,000 people each year.

== History ==
The theatre's history goes back to 1818 when three young Bornholmers thought it would be a good idea to develop the carnival masquerades of the times into an actual theatre performance. As a result, on Carnaval Monday, 2 February 1818, a few scenes from Ludvig Holberg's Jean de France were staged in Madam Wolffsen's Hall in Rønne's Silkegade. People were so enthusiastic that on 4 April, the drama group "Ei Blot til Lyst" was founded. After raising 4,444 Rigsdaler, the company built the theatre in Teaterstræde. The first performance was Kotzebue's De onde Luner staged on 29 November 1823. Despite the various repairs and renovations the theatre building has undergone, the stage itself has survived unaltered until today.

== The theatre today ==
Bornholms Teatre (Bornholm's Theatre), as it is now known, is a regional theatre which also stages performances by theatrical companies on tour. A major annual attraction is the Bornholmer Revue. In collaboration with Bornholms Dramaskole, the theatre provides a venue for local children to be introduced to the art of drama. The Bornholm Regional Municipality provides financial support for the theatre. The theater has become a summer performance venue.

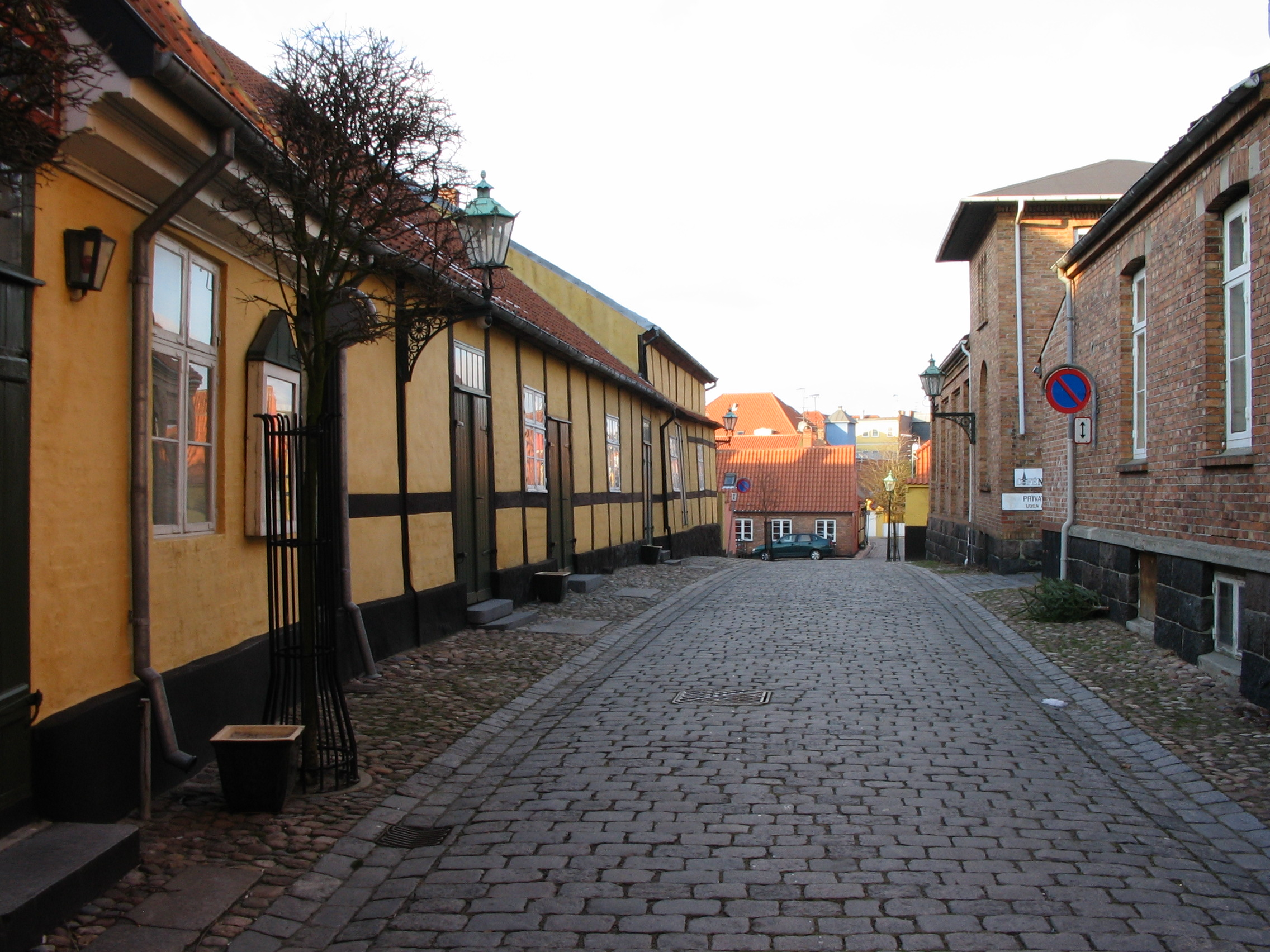

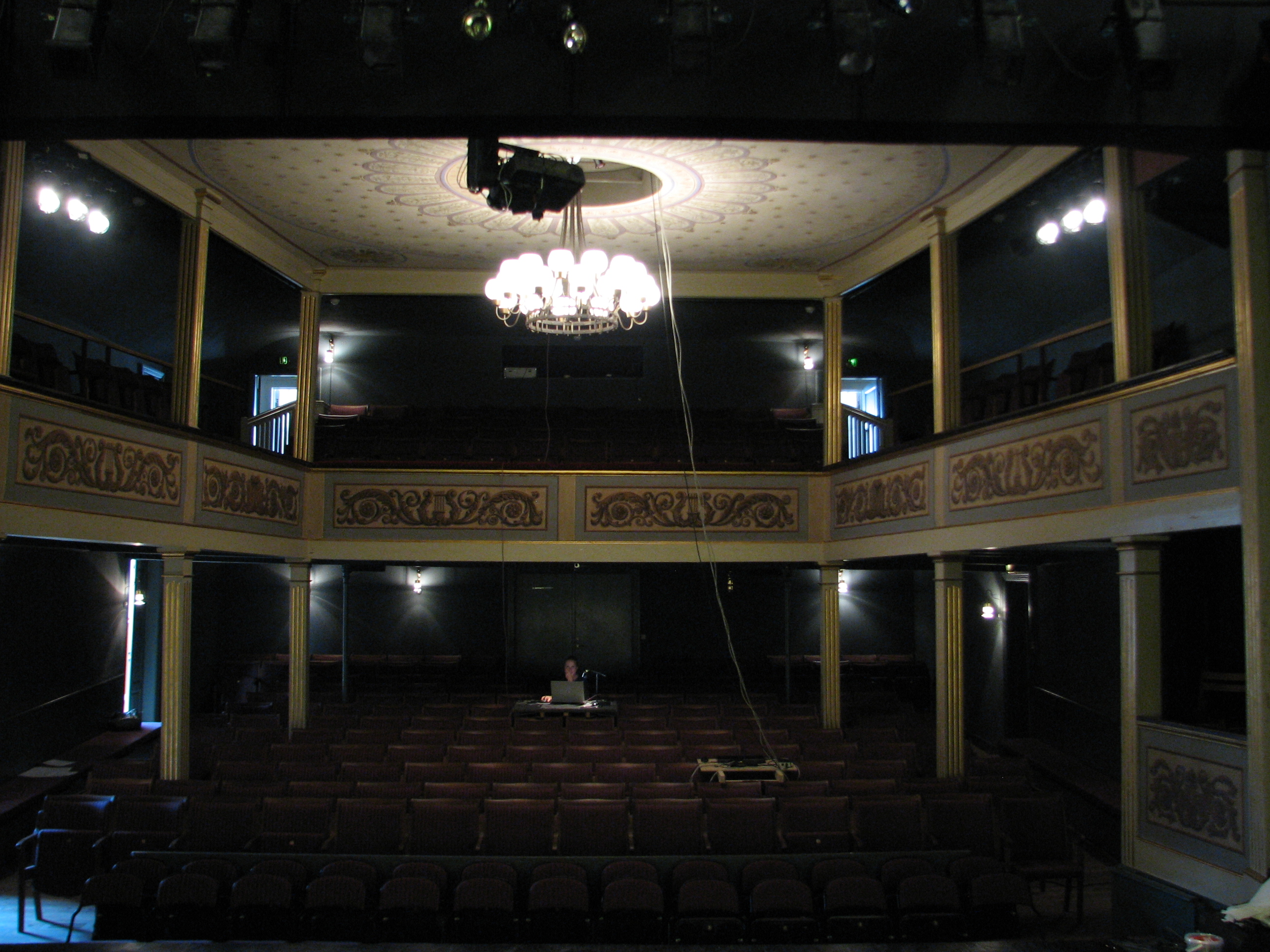

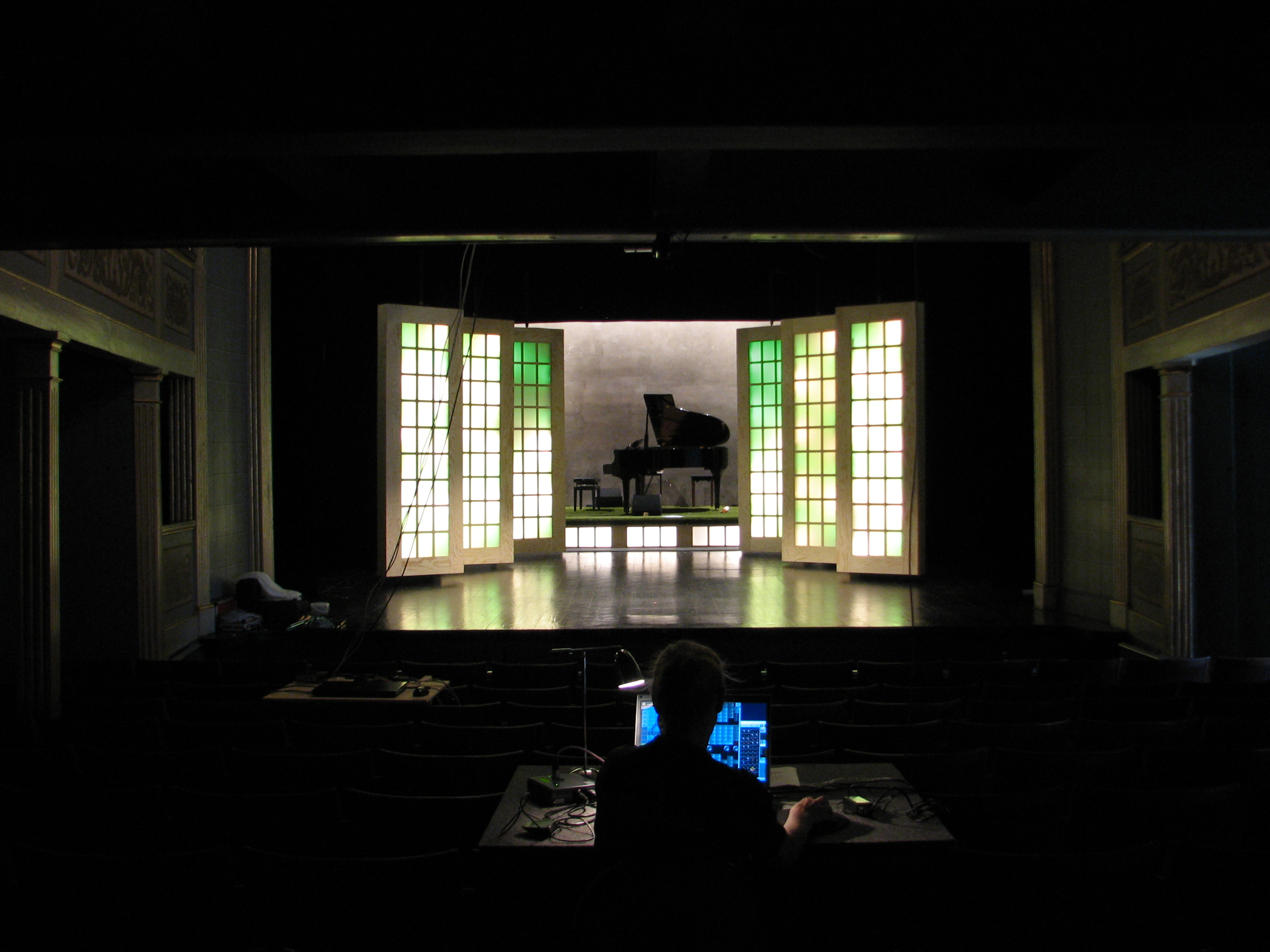
