= Gazmend Pula =

Kosovar politician

Gazmend Pula (born in Pristina, Kosovo) is a Kosovar-Albanian intellectual, human rights campaigner, and is Kosovar ambassador to Albania. He is the founder of the Kosovo Helsinki Committee for Human Rights based in Pristina, and has been active in the struggle for the advancement of political and civil liberties in Kosovo, for which he was awarded the US and EU Democracy and Civil Society Award in 1998. In addition to his civic and political engagements, he holds a PhD in Electrical Engineering, and is the author of two books on electrical engineering. Prior to being appointed ambassador by the President of Kosovo, he held the title of associate professor in the University of Pristina, Cathedra for Production and Transmission of Electrical Energy.

He is married and is the father of two children.
