= Institute for Field Research =

American archaeology non-profit organization

Institute for Field Research (IFR)
- Founded: 2011
- Type: Educational Operating public charity
- Purpose: Archaeology, Anthropology, Environmental Studies, Fieldwork, Field Schools, Research, Study Abroad Programs
- Location: 2999 Overland Ave. #103, Los Angeles CA. 90064
- Services: Conservation, Archaeological Research and Funding, Cultural Heritage
- Key people: Chair of the Board; Yuval Bar Zemer, Chair of the Academic Board: Anthony Graesch, Other Board Members: Willeke Wendrich, Kevin Vaughn, Fred Limp, Lynn Swartz Dodd, Jason de Leon, Emily Lindsey, Barra O'Donnabhain, Tim Williams, Benjamin Porter, Rowan Flad, John Given, Julie K. Stein
- Website: http://www.ifrglobal.org

The Institute for Field Research (IFR) is a nonprofit organization established in 2011 by a group of academic archaeologists. It operates as an independent, nonprofit academic organization that offers field research courses (field schools) at various sites around the world.

The IFR worked with different universities to provide students with academic credit units. At present, the IFR school of record is Connecticut College. Through this agreement, students receive 8 semester credit units (equivalent to 12 quarter units) for attending any of the field schools offered by the IFR. These units are transferable to student's home institution through official Connecticut College transcripts. Students receive a letter grade for attending a field school. All field schools provide a minimum of 160 direct instructional hours.

The IFR has conducted field schools at numerous sites around the world, including Cahokia, Spike Island and Ribchester. The institute has also collaborated with forensic anthropologists from the San Bernardino County Sheriff Department to excavate and identify human remains.
