= Culture House =

Culture House or House of Culture may refer to:

== Scandinavia ==
- Buen kulturhus, Mandal, Norway
- Culture House, Reykjavík, see Safnahúsið
- Dunker Culture House, Helsingborg, Sweden
- The House of Culture (Hamar) (Kulturhuset), Hamar, Norway
- Kulttuuritalo (The House of Culture), Helsinki
- Kulturhuset (The House of Culture), Stockholm
- Kulturhuset (Randers) (The House of Culture), Randers, Denmark
- Vennesla Library and Culture House (Vennesla bibliotek og kulturhus), Vennesla, Norway

== Americas ==
- Buenos Aires House of Culture
- Casa de la Cultura Ecuatoriana (House of Ecuadorian Culture)
- Government House, Belize, site of the House of Culture Museum

== Others ==
- House of Culture (Irpin), Ukraine
- Culture House, Laguna de Duero, Spain
- Maison de la Culture de Grenoble, France
- Montalbán de Córdoba#Culture House, Spain
- Palace of Culture or House of Culture in the former Soviet Union and other Eastern Bloc countries (lists several notable ones)
- Skalica Culture House, Slovakia

== See also ==
- Cultural center
- Estonian House
- Haus der Kulturen der Welt (House of World Cultures), Berlin
- Institute of Culture
- Kulturhuset (disambiguation)
- Moscow theater hostage crisis, also known as House of Culture Incident
