= Ranslet =

Ranslet is a surname. Notable people with the surname include:

- Arne Ranslet (1931–2018), Danish sculptor and ceramist
- Pia Ranslet (born 1956), Danish painter and sculptor
- Tulla Blomberg Ranslet (born 1928), Norwegian painter and sculptor

== See also ==
- Ransley
