= Kulturhuset (disambiguation) =

Kulturhuset ("the house of culture") may refer to:

- Arendal Kulturhus, see Arendal Town Hall
- Buen kulturhus, Mandal, Norway
- Dunker Culture House (Dunkers kulturhus), Helsingborg, Sweden
- The House of Culture (Hamar) (Kulturhuset), Hamar, Norway
- Kulttuuritalo, Helsinki, Finland
- Kulturhuset, Stockholm, Sweden
- Kulturhuset (Randers), Randers, Denmark
- Spira Cultural Center (Kulturhuset Spira), Jönköping, Sweden
- Vennesla Library and Culture House (Vennesla bibliotek og kulturhus), Vennesla, Norway
