= The Multilingual Library =

Library in Oslo, Norway

Coordinates: 59°54′32″N 10°45′09″E

The Multilingual Library in Oslo, Norway (Norwegian: Det flerspråklige bibliotek) is a competence centre for multicultural library services, and acts as an advisor to libraries.

The Multilingual Library purchases and lends out books, audio books, movies and music in the following languages: Albanian, Amharic, Arabic, Bosnian, Burmese, Dari, English, Finnish, French, Hausa, Hindi, Yoruba, Chinese, Croatian, Kurdish, Lithuanian, Dutch, Oromo, Punjabi, Pashto, Persian, Polish, Portuguese, Romanian, Russian, Serbian, Shona, Somali, Spanish, Swahili, Tagalog, Tamil, Thai, Tigrinya, Chechen, Turkish, Twi, Hungarian, Urdu and Vietnamese.

== History and background ==
Soon after immigration to Norway took off in the late 1960s, Deichmanske bibliotek / Oslo Public Library became aware of the needs of the many foreign immigrants in the capital for adequate library services. The majority of immigrants to Norway at this early stage came from Pakistan, and the library purchased its first books in Urdu in the early 1970s. Gradually, other immigrant groups entered Norway leading to a demand for books in languages such as Arabic and Turkish.

Libraries in other parts of Norway also felt the increased demand for books in foreign languages. Deichmanske bibliotek / Oslo Public Library was therefore given the national responsibility for meeting these multilingual demands, and as from 1975 the Government, represented by the Norwegian Ministry of Culture, has allocated an annual amount towards this activity.

The practice soon became popular and the demands on competence, as well as the increased work load forced new ways of organising the activity. In 1983 Deichmanske bibliotek / Oslo Public Library set up a Section for literature for immigrants. In 1996 the section’s name was changed to The Multilingual Library and was launched as a national competence library.

As of 2017, the library is part of the National Library of Norway.

The three main functions of The Multilingual Library:

- Competence and advisory centre for multicultural library services with a special focus on services for asylum seekers, immigrants and refugees;
- Purchasing and cataloguing unit for literature and other media in multiple foreign languages;
- National central for distance lending of literature and other media for asylum seekers, refugees and immigrants.

The target groups of The Multilingual Library:

- County, public and school libraries, as well as other public institutions such as hospital libraries and prison libraries;
- Teaching staff in nursery schools and educational establishments;
- Individuals whose mother tongue is among The Library’s languages, as well as those who want to learn a language.

== Publishing ==
The Multilingual Library has exclusive rights in Norway to translate and publish books from the British publisher Mantra Lingua. The books are bilingual children’s books with text in Norwegian and parallel text in Arabic, Kurdish, Persian, Somali, and Urdu. Five books have been published so far:

- Ali Baba and the Forty Thieves
- Beowulf
- The Whirling Hijab
- The Little Red Hen and the Grains of Wheat
- A Journey through Islamic Art

== See also ==
- List of libraries in Norway
