= International Library of Fashion Research =

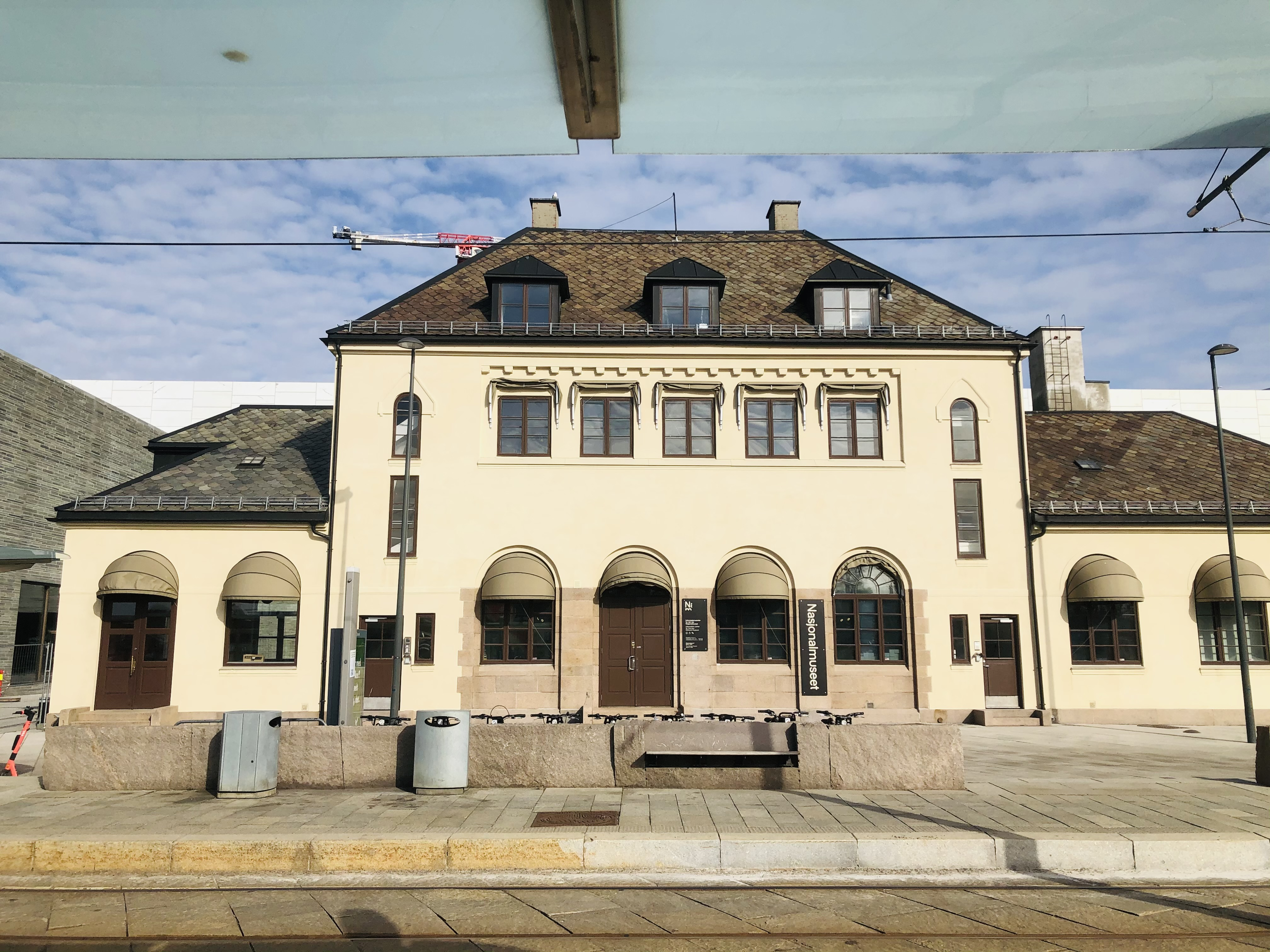
- 59.9109573°N 10.7273592°E
- Location: Oslo, Norway
- Type: Special library
- Established: October 15, 2020; 6 years ago

Other information
- Parent organization: National Museum of Norway
- Website: fashionresearchlibrary.com

The International Library of Fashion Research is a partner of the National Museum of Norway in Oslo. It was founded by Elise By Olsen, opening online on 15 October 2020 and physically on 29 November 2022. It occupies two floors of the former Station Master's House (Norwegian: Stasjonsmesterboligen) in front of the new National Museum building. The library is open to the public, and access is free.

The genesis of the library was Steven Mark Klein's decision in 2019 to leave Olsen, who considered him her mentor, his personal collection of printed matter related to the fashion industry. Olsen negotiated with the National Museum to house the material, then raised funding from a number of sources to the tune of some one million kroner (c. $106,000) to move Klein's collection from New York to Oslo.

The library's holdings comprise several thousand printed items from fashion industry companies and designers such as Acne Studios, Comme des Garçons, Issey Miyake, Martin Margiela, Nan Goldin, Gucci, Jil Sander, Dries Van Noten, Marni, Alessandro Michele, Virgil Abloh, and Walter Van Beirendonck. Although formal books and magazines form part of the collection, there is a strong focus on disposable ephemera like fashion show invitations and notes, brand magazines, lookbooks, branded press releases, direct mail etc.

The library's launch exhibition was For Immediate Release: The Art of the Press Release.

== See also ==
- List of libraries in Norway
