= Parker ITR Srl v Commission =

Parker ITR Srl v Commission (2014) C-434/13 is an EU law case of a cartel of six international suppliers of marine hoses (rubber hoses used to load or unload oil tankers in marine transfer operations).

== Facts ==
The cartel existed at least from 1986 and was uncovered in 2006, when one of the member companies provided information to authorities. The cartel operated by price fixing, bid rigging and market allocation. The members included:

- Bridgestone Corporation
- Yokohama Rubber Company
- Dunlop Oil & Marine Ltd, belonging to Continental AG
- Trelleborg Industries SAS, belonging to Trelleborg AB
- Parker ITR Srl, belonging to Parker Hannifin
- Manuli Rubber Industries SpA

Cartel members reported customer inquiries to the coordinator, who would then allocate the customer to one particular cartel member, unbeknownst to the customer. The members would then agree on fake price quotes, so that the intended member would win the bid. In December 2006, the Yokohama Rubber Company provided information about the cartel to EU authorities. In return the company did not have to pay any fines, in agreement with the 2006 Commission Notice on Immunity from fines and reduction of fines in cartel cases. The EU then launched surprise inspections at the member companies and interviewed individuals. A May 2007 meeting of the cartel in Houston was secretly taped by the FBI. Eight employees were arrested, seven of which pleaded guilty and served prison terms of up to two years; one employee was acquitted.

== Judgment ==
In 2009, the European Union Commission imposed total fines of 131 million Euros on the member companies; one of these fines was later reduced by 19 million Euros by the courts.

By 2010, the U.S. Department of Justice had also levied fines of $12.3 million against four of the companies. Several individuals involved in the cartel received prison sentences in the UK and the US.

== Prosecutions ==
In 2008, the UK's Office of Fair Trading obtained convictions of three Dunlop executives involved in the cartel, resulting in prison sentences between 30 and 36 months. The sentences were reduced on appeal to 20-30 months.

=== Romano Pisciotti ===
Romano Pisciotti, an Italian citizen, had participated in the cartel as an employee of Parker. The U.S. obtained a sealed indictment against him in 2010. Italy does not extradite its citizens to the U.S., but when Pisciotti changed planes in Frankfurt, Germany in 2013, he was arrested and extradition proceedings were initiated. His appeal to the German Federal Constitutional Court was unsuccessful, and he was extradited to the U.S. in 2014. He thus became the first European citizen to be extradited to the U.S. on antitrust charges. As part of a plea bargain, he pleaded guilty and received a 24-month prison sentence and a $50,000 fine.

Pisciotti then sued the German government for damages, claiming that the EU prohibition on discrimination had been violated in his case, as Germany will not extradite German citizens to the U.S. The European Court of Justice rejected this argument in April 2018, holding that discrimination is justified in cases like this.
