= Oslo Public Library =

Public library in Oslo, Norway

Deichman Library
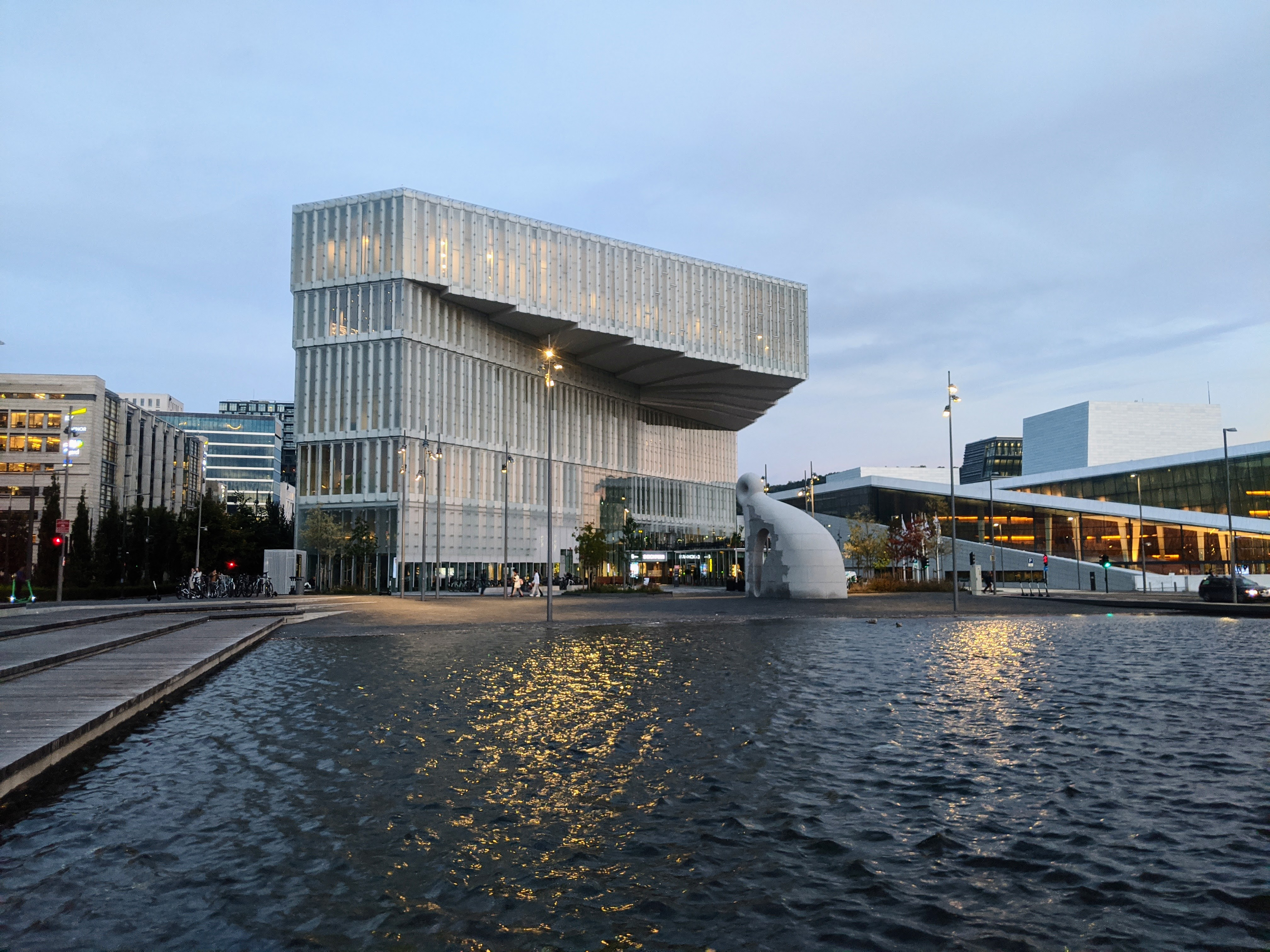

General information
- Type: Public Library
- Architectural style: Functionalism and Deconstructivism
- Location: Oslo, Norway
- Completed: 2019
- Opened: Current: 2020. Previous: 1933

Technical details
- Structural system: 3 see-through cubes in light grey/white with openings on the left and right sides on the two other ones.

Design and construction
- Architects: Lundhagem Arkitekter and Atelier Oslo
- Main contractor: Diagonale
- Awards: IFLA/Systematic Public Library of the Year 2021, Norwegian Library of the Year 2020, Trend Brand of the Year 2020

Website
- deichman.no/in-english

A March 2021 video tour of the library.

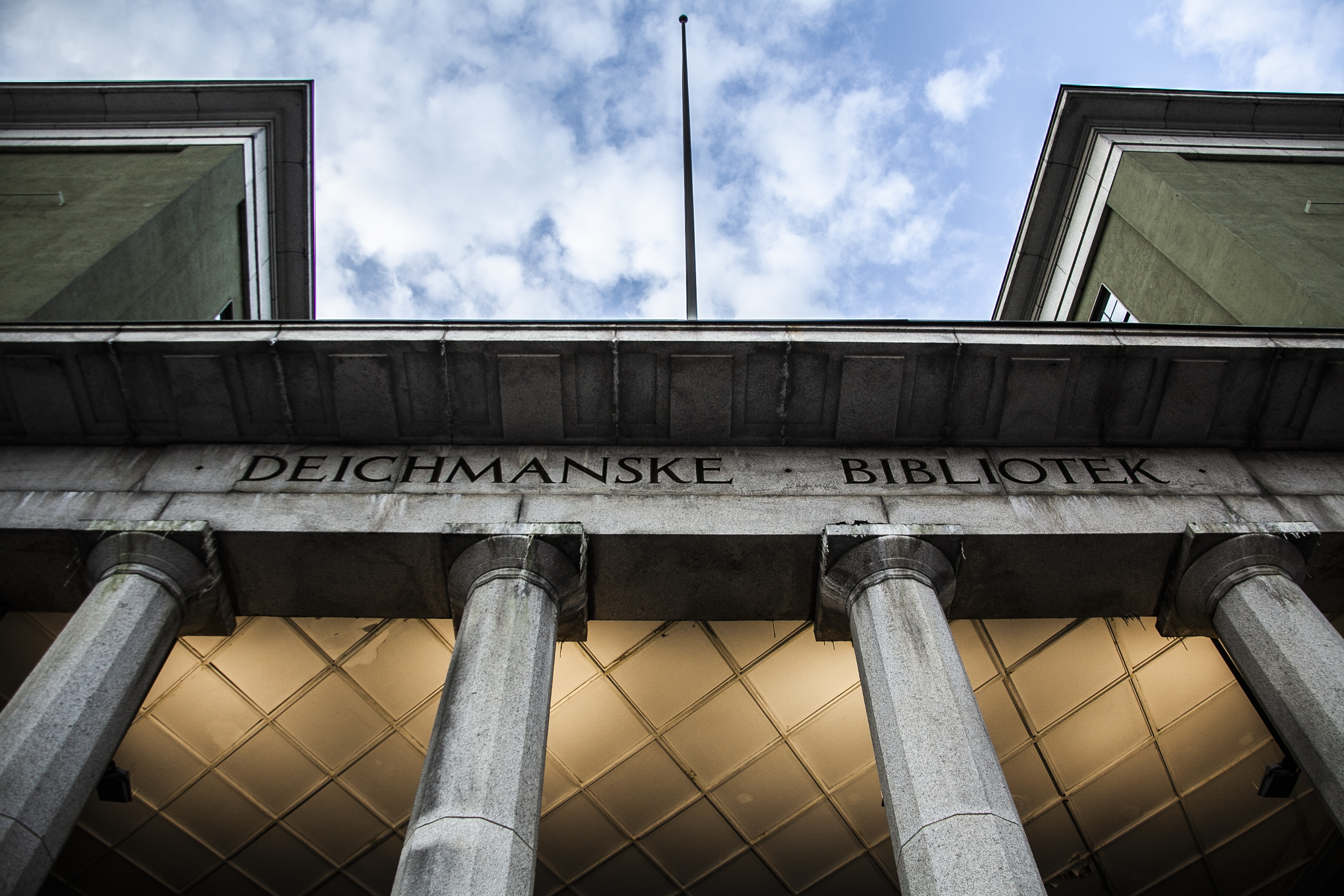
Entrance to the former library building.

Oslo Public Library (officially called in Norwegian Deichman bibliotek, Deichman Library) is the municipal public library serving Oslo, Norway, and is the country's first and largest library. It employs over 300 people and has over 20 branches throughout the city. Registered users may use the library every day, even when it is not staffed, from 7 am to 10 pm. It is also possible to borrow and return books when the library is not staffed. One of the most prized books in the library's collection is the Vulgate Bible of Aslak Bolt (1430–1450), Norway's only preserved liturgical handwritten manuscript from medieval times. The book itself is estimated to have been written around 1250. The head of the library from 2014 to 2016 was Kristin Danielsen.

== History ==
The library opened on 12 January 1785 following an endowment from Carl Deichman, who also bequeathed 7,000 books and 150 manuscripts which formed the basis of the library's collection.

From the start the library was open to all citizens. At the time most lending libraries charged a membership fee, making it impossible for poorer people to access them. However, the initial collection was largely made up of texts in German, French, Latin and Danish and was therefore largely only of interest to members of the educated upper class. In 1802 it was decided to move the library to the Oslo Cathedral School and to merge it with the school's collection. Jacob Rosted was both librarian of the Deichman Library and rector of the school. The library remained part of the school until the mid-1800s, when it got its own premises. Under the leadership of Haakon Nyhuus, who was head librarian from 1898 to 1913, the library became a model for public libraries throughout the Nordic region. Nyhuus modernised the library along American lines, having spent eight years in America and been inspired by Carnegie libraries. Among his innovations were the introduction of reading rooms and the addition of books for children and young people. During Nyhuus' time as librarian, the collection tripled in size and the borrowing of books increased by 25 times. The library had an estimated 4,000 visitors a day. The library now has a bust of Nyhuus.

== Departments ==
The library has several specialised departments, such as a music department, and a department for children and youth (decorated by Tulla Blomberg Ranslet), a department for prison libraries and a library for patients at the Rikshospital. It previously also housed The Multilingual Library, which is now part of the National Library of Norway.

== Building ==
The library's main building, Deichman Bjørvika, is in the Bjørvika district of Oslo, next to the Opera and the new Munch Museum, part of the Fjord City renewal project. It was designed by architectural firms Lundhagem and Atelier Oslo Deichman Bjørvika opened to the public on 18 June 2020. Deichman Bjørvika has won several awards, including the International Federation of Library Associations and Institutions / Systematic Public Library of the Year award. The building holds manuscripts contributed to Future Library, among them texts by Margaret Atwood and David Mitchell. The building houses several busts, including one of Karen-Christine Friele. It featured as part of the introduction of the Norwegian finalist during Eurovision 2023 Contest.

== See also ==
- List of libraries in Norway
