= Epos (library ship) =

Library ship operating in Norway

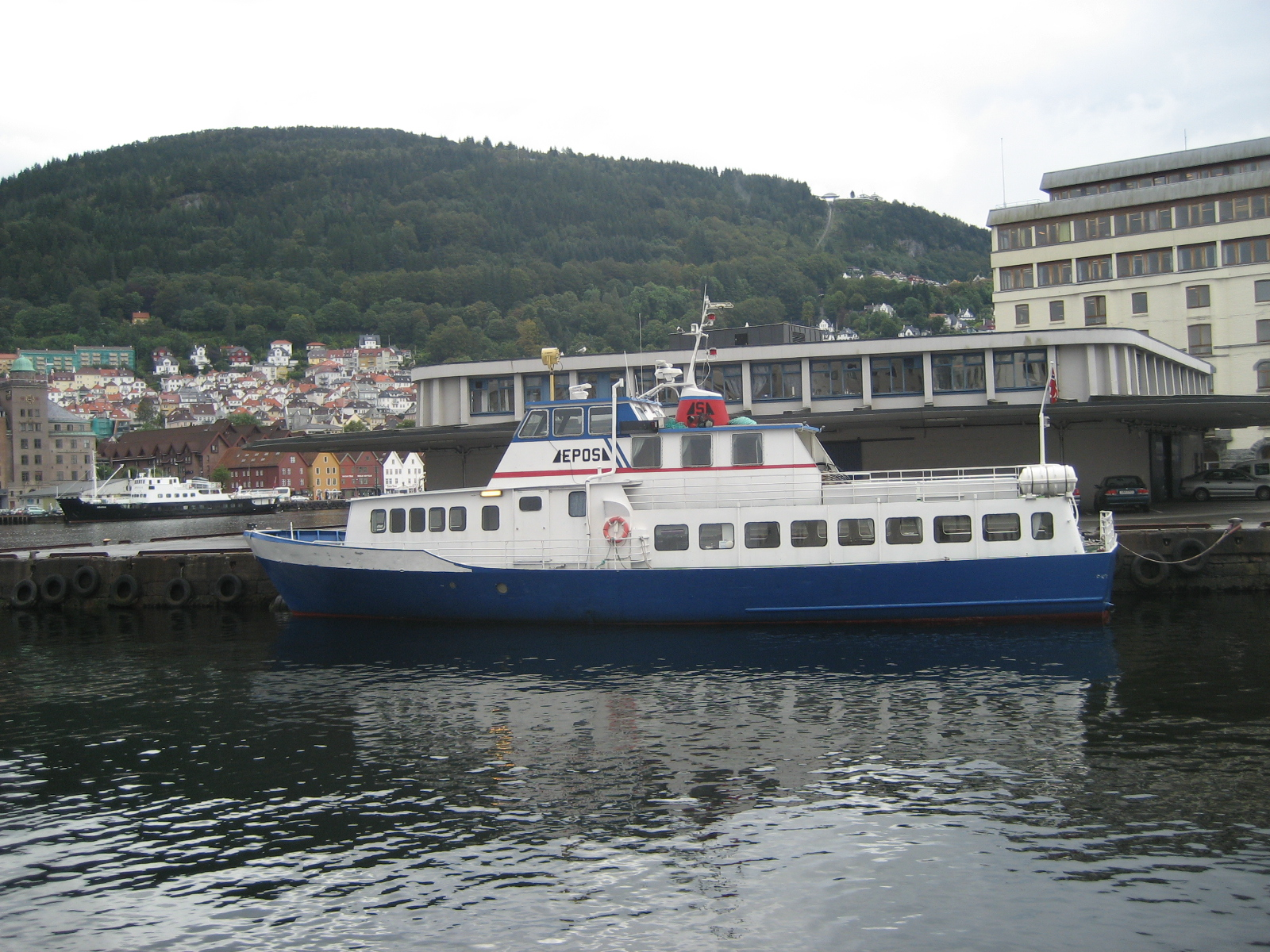
- Epos at dock in Bergen.

History

Norway
- Name: Epos
- Owner: Vinnes Skyssbåtservice
- Builder: Omi, Strandebarm
- Launched: 1963
- Out of service: 2020
- Identification: IMO number: 8428868; MMSI number: 257228700; Callsign: LAZT
- Status: in active service, as of 2012

General characteristics
- Type: Floating library
- Length: 80 ft (24 m)

Epos is a floating library that operated in the counties of Hordaland, Sogn og Fjordane and Møre og Romsdal in Norway. It is the first custom-built library boat in the world. The service started in 1959 and visited tiny places in the three counties twice a year. In 2005 the ship was in service 126 days per year, lending 53,300 books. In 2020, the last trip the boat was to take was cancelled due to the COVID-19 pandemic and the service officially ended.

The ship had room for 6,000 books, with a further 20,000 books out on loan at any given time. It often offered cultural activities for children, including musicians or dramas. This was often the only cultural services provided in the places it visited. The ship was crewed by a captain, an able sailor, three librarians and one or two performers. The service was funded by the county libraries in the participating counties.

== History ==
The first floating library service started in 1959 using a range of ships. The first custom-built ship was put into service in 1963. It is built at Oma Yard and is 24 m (80 ft) long. The ship is owned by Vinnes Skyssbåtservice, and is used for tourist cruises in the summer.

In 2020 it ceased to be used as a library boat, and began being used as a floating literature house, hosting literary events. However, continued funding was difficult to obtain and in 2025 the future of Epos is unclear.

== See also ==
- List of libraries in Norway
