= Haakon Nyhuus =

Norwegian librarian and encyclopedist (1866–1913)

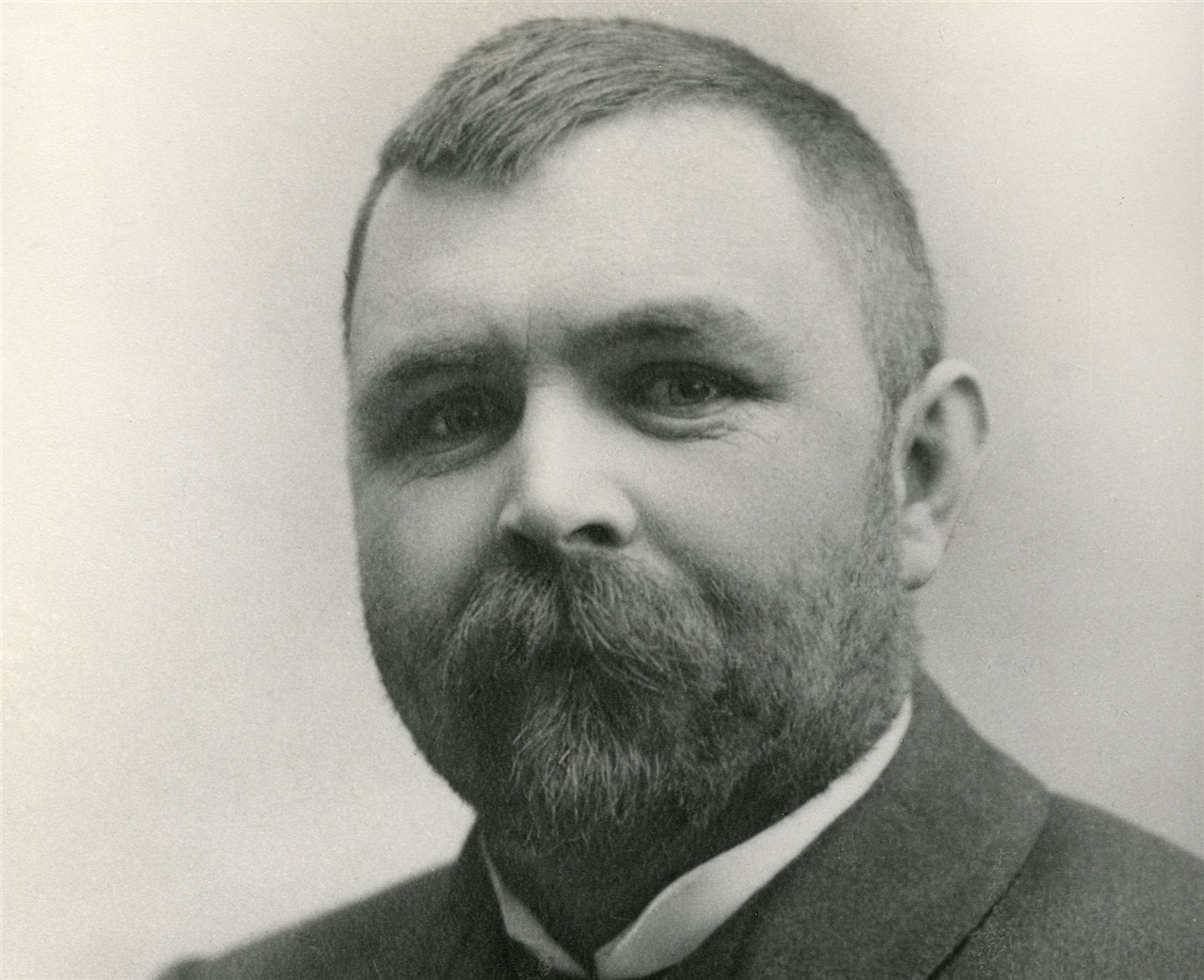
Haakon Nyhuus

Haakon Nyhuus (28 November 1866 – December 1913) was a Norwegian librarian and encyclopedist.

Haakon Nyhuus was born in Trysil Municipality in Hedmark, Norway as the son of Ole Olsen Nyhuus (1827–1874) who was mayor of Trysil and a Member of Parliament from Hedmark. Both of his parents died early. Nyhuus spent much of his childhood living with an uncle in Sweden. He returned Christiania (now Oslo) in 1885 to become a student at the Otto Anderssens skole. He traveled to Chicago in 1890. Haakon Nyhuus worked at Newberry Library under William Frederick Poole, chief of the catalog department at the Chicago Public Library.

He returned to Norway in 1897. From 1898, he headed Deichman library, the main branch of the Oslo Public Library in Oslo. He was chief editor of the six-volume encyclopedia Aschehougs Illustreret norsk Konversationsleksikon, published from 1906 to 1913. He also introduced Dewey Decimal Classification into the library system of Norway. He was decorated Knight, First Class of the Order of St. Olav in 1912.
