= Steven Mark Klein =

American cultural theorist, archivist, and author

Steven Mark Klein (died October 25, 2021) was an American cultural theorist, archivist, and author. Klein was born in Brooklyn, New York. His father was a taxi driver and his mother a homemaker. He studied art theory at the School of Visual Arts. His collection of fashion and design printed ephemera is at the core of the International Library of Fashion Research's holdings.
