= Elise By Olsen =

Elise By Olsen in 2020

Elise By Olsen is a Norwegian fashion publisher and editor.

== Career ==
- In 2012, Olsen founded the publication Recens Paper, a 200-270 page magazine published biannually in print only.
- In 2018, Ssense and Gucci produced a documentary about Olsen.
- In 2018, Olsen debuted Wallet, a small format magazine of fashion commentary. In 2021, it ceased publication after its tenth issue.
- In 2020, Olsen announced she was launching the International Library of Fashion Research. It officially opened in 2022.
