= Henry Dunker =

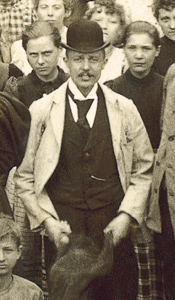
Henry Dunker in the 1890s

Henry Christian Louis Dunker (6 September 1870 – 3 May 1962) was a Swedish businessman and industrialist in Helsingborg, Sweden. His father was the founder of Helsingsborgs Gummifabrik AB (sv), also known as Tretorn AB, a manufacturer of rubber products which Dunker established as an international business. At the time of his death in 1962, Dunker was Sweden's wealthiest man. His fortune was donated to the improvement of the city of Helsingborg.

== Early years ==
The Dunker family had its origin in Schleswig-Holstein. The family lived in Esbjerg, Denmark when Henry was born in 1870. Henry was two years old when his father Johan Dunker, who was an engineer at the time, was asked to lead the work and building of property at the Port of Helsingborg.

== Business ==
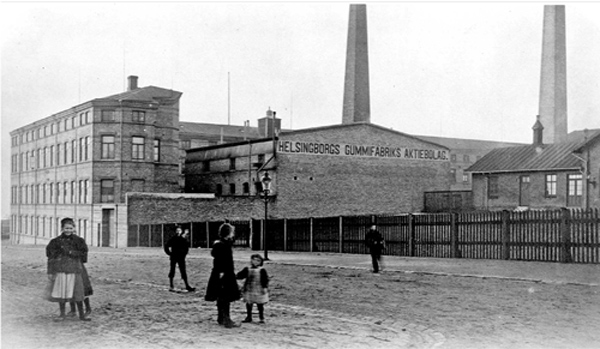
The factory in 1901

In 1891, Dunker's father Johan founded Helsingsborgs Gummifabrik AB. The rubber footwear produced by the factory was of poor quality, so the younger Dunker travelled to Russia to learn how to produce better rubber. During a visit to Saint Petersburg, Russia, he did not find any new material, but in Riga, Latvia he met chemist Julius von Gerkan, who agreed to help him improve the rubber formula. His company was known for creating a rubber that was soft when cold but not sticky when the weather improved.

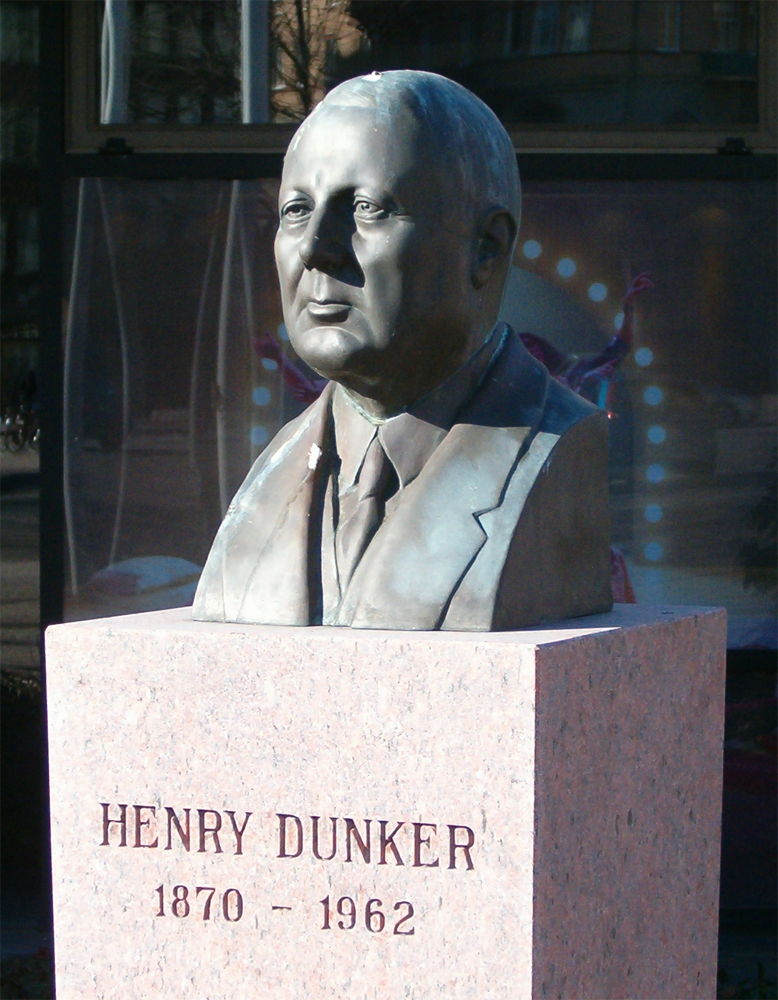
Bust of Henry Dunker at Helsingborg's Civic Theatre

In 1894, Dunker took over control of the factory and, after some time, expanded the factory. In 1905, Dunker, along with Johan Kock, changed the Velox factory in Trelleborg into the Trelleborgs gummifabrik. Through a network of sales offices not only in Sweden but also in Copenhagen, Berlin and Vienna, Dunker gained better control over the distribution chain. With time, the rubber products produced by his company expanded to include tennis balls, shower caps and tires. In 1912, Dunker created a cartel with the purpose of increasing its competitive power abroad. Prices for the rubber increased in Sweden but were lowered abroad.

Dunker gave his workers free healthcare and subsidized medicine. He installed wooden floors in his factories to improve the comfort of his workers. In 1911, he started a day care facility (barnkrubban) to provide care for his employees' children during the workday, a phenomenon that began in the 1850s but was still unusual in the early 20th century.

In 1961, at 90 years of age, Dunker was still chair of the board of his company Trelleborgs Gummifabriks AB. The business employed 5,000 people and had a floor area of 180,000 square yards (150,000 m^{2}).

== Death and legacy ==
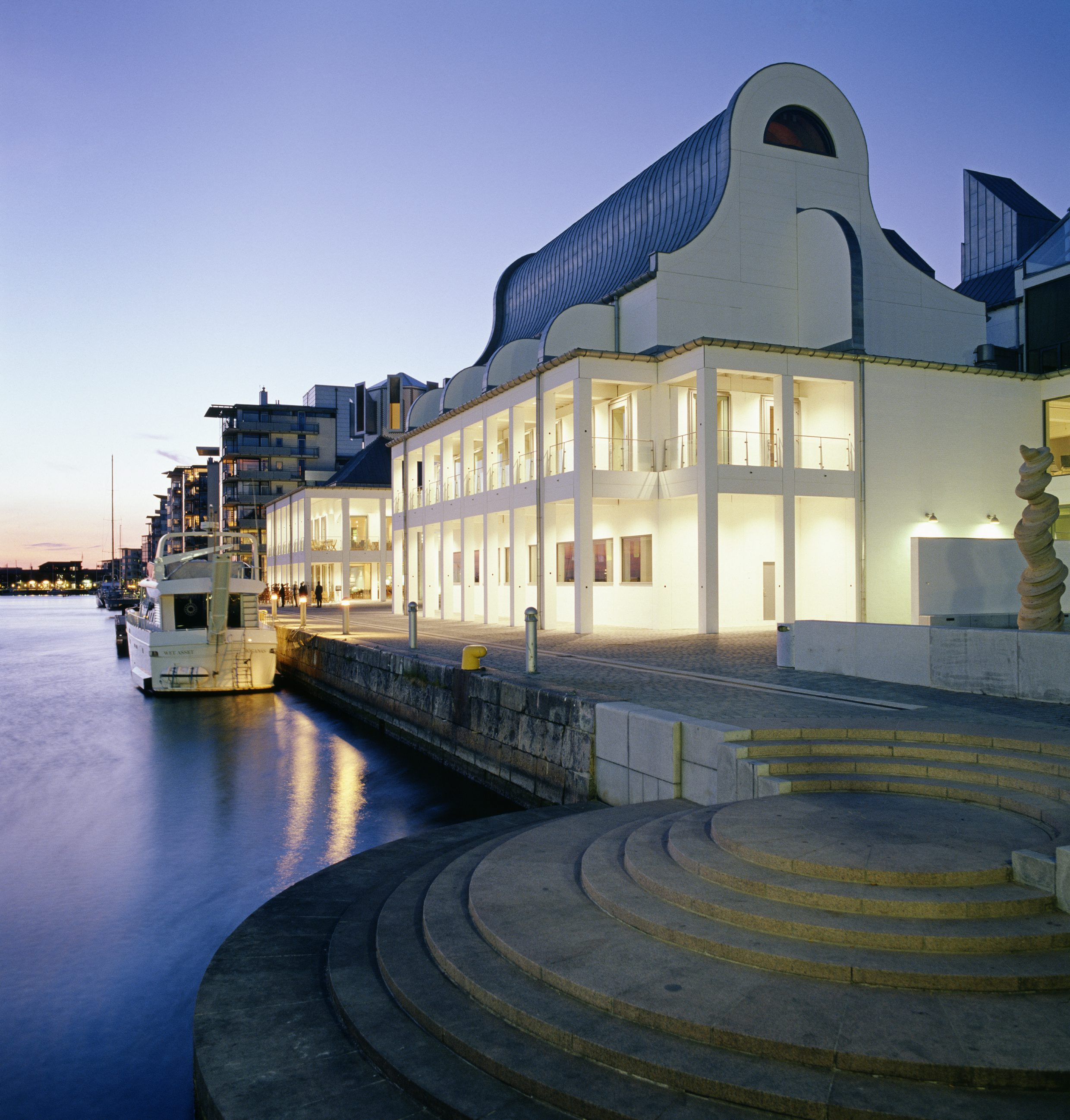
The Dunkers Kulturhus is a museum and art centre in Dunker's adopted city

Dunker was married to Gerda Sylvan (1879–1936), a daughter of the merchant August Sylvan and Gustava Eleonora Lundgren.

Dunker died in 1962 in Helsingborg. Upon his death, he willed his fortune to the Henry and Gerda Dunker Foundation which subsequently funded many improvements to Helsingborg. The Henry and Gerda Dunker Foundation, together with the Henry and Gerda Dunker Donation Fund No. 2, own the majority voting interest of Trelleborg AB. Dunker is buried at Donationskyrkogården in Helsingborg.
