= Carl Deichman =

Norwegian businessman

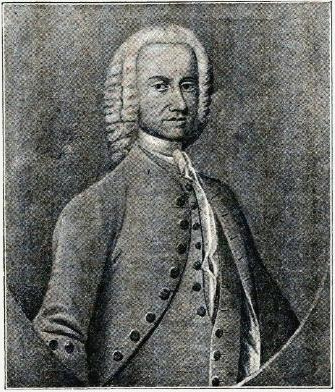
Carl Deichman

Carl Deichman (1705 – 21 April 1780) was a Norwegian businessman, industrialist, book collector and philanthropist. His endowment lead to the founding of the Oslo Public Library officially known as Deichman Library (Deichmanske bibliotek).

== Biography ==
Deichman was born in Viborg, Denmark. He grew up in Christiania (now Oslo), Norway. He was one of the six children of Bartholomæus Deichman (1671–1731), Bishop of Christiania and Else Rosemeyer (ca. 1669-1745). He received his early education at home and was taught Latin, language, history and political science. He was first employed in 1726 at the court of King Frederick IV in Copenhagen. In 1733, he was appointed Chancellor and assessor in the court trial in Christiania. He later settled at Porsgrunn in Telemark where he lived the rest of his life.

Deichman had learned a practical knowledge of mining operations at the Kongsberg Silver Mines. After the death of his father's brother Evert Deichman in 1734, he purchased Fossum works (Fossum Verk) at Gjerpen in Telemark together with his elder brother, Vilhelm Deichman (1709-1769) and brother-in-law Herman Leopoldus Løvenskiold (1701–1759), husband of their sister Margrethe Deichman. Carl and Vilhelm Deichman became co-owners of Bolvig Ironworks (Bolvik Jernverk) in Telemark in 1734-1741. In 1737 he bought the share of Herman Løvenskiold. From 1753 the brothers were also for a time co-owners of Eidsfoss Ironworks (Eidsfoss jernverk) in Vestfold. After his brother Vilhelm died in 1769, Carl Deichman became the sole owner of their not insignificant common fortune.

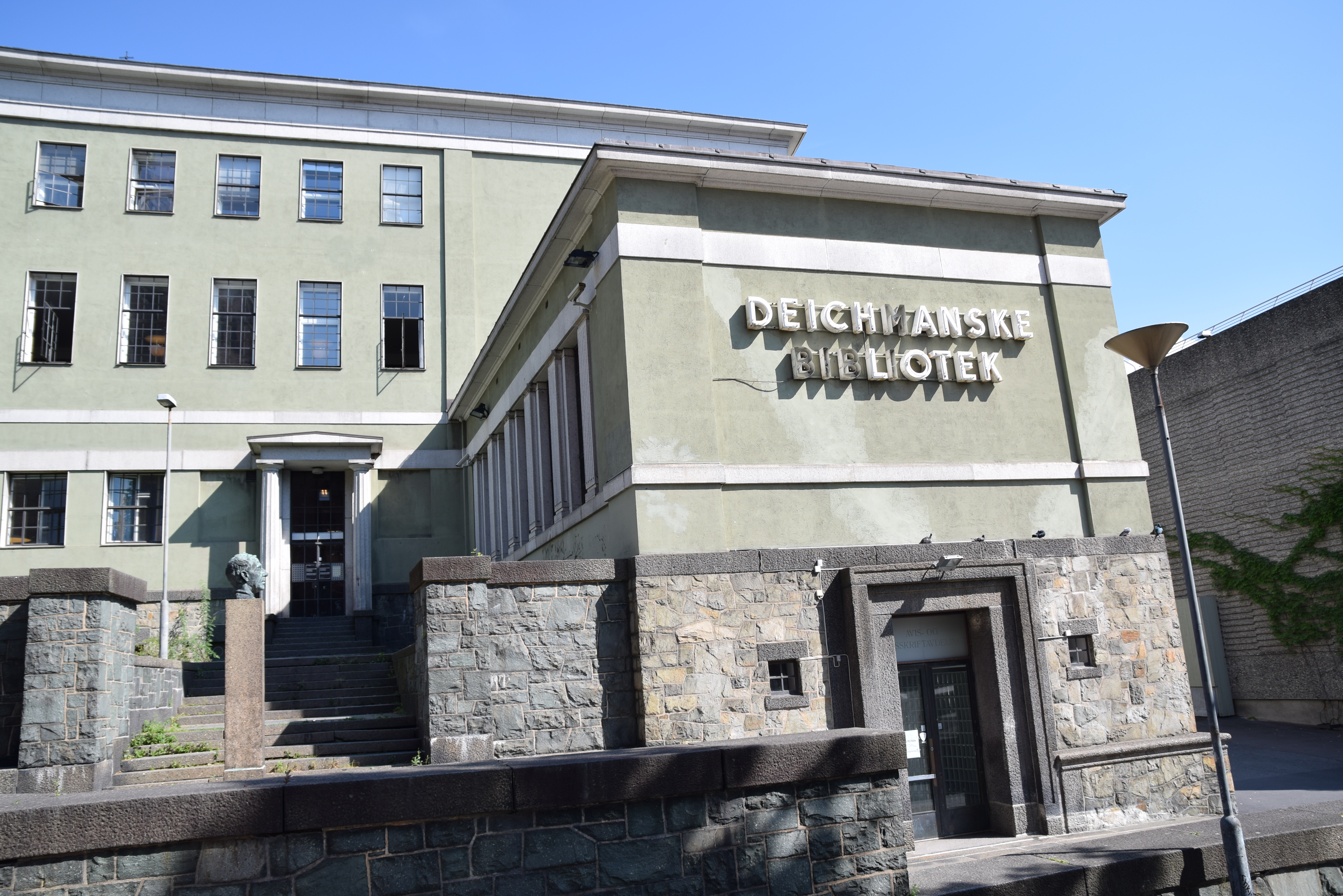
Deichmanske bibliotek, Oslo

== Deichman Library ==
At the time of his death in 1780, his personal collection consisted of over 6,000 books in addition to manuscripts, diplomas, maps, antiques and a coin collection. In his will Carl Deichman bequeathed his book collection to the city of Christiania. Deichman Library was opened in 1785. This collection and an additional endowment formed the initial basis for the Deichmanske bibliotek of the Oslo Public Library. Deichman Library now consists of 22 branch libraries located all over Oslo. Carl Deichman's original collection is still intact and is well preserved in the main library.

== Other sources ==
- Nils Johan Ringdal (1985) By, bok og borger Deichmanske bibliotek gjennom 200 år (Oslo: Aschehoug) ISBN 9788203114243
