= List of libraries in Norway =

This is a list of libraries in Norway.

== Libraries by region ==
=== Central ===
- Gunnerus Library, Trondheim
- NTNU University Library, Trondheim
- Trøndelag County Library

=== Eastern ===
- BI Norwegian School of Business Library, Oslo
- County library of Akershus, Buskerud and Østfold
- Inland Norway University of Applied Sciences Library, Elverum
- International Library of Fashion Research, Oslo
- Library of the Norwegian Parliament, Oslo
- NMBU Library, Oslo
- Norwegian Defence University College Library, Oslo
- National Library of Norway, Oslo
  - The Multilingual Library
- Norwegian Labour Movement Archives and Library, Oslo
- Norwegian Library of Talking Books and Braille, Oslo
- Oslo Metropolitan University Library
- Oslo Public Library/Deichman Bibliotek
- Telemark County Library
- Tønsberg and Færder Public Library
- University of Oslo Library
- Vestfold County Library

=== Northern ===
- Finnmark County Library, Vadsø
- Nord University Library, Bodø
- Troms County Library
- Tromsø University Library

=== Southern ===
- Agder County Library
- Agder University Library
- Buen kulturhus library
- Vågsbygd library, Kristiansand
- Vennesla Library and Culture House

=== Western ===
- Bergen Public Library
- Bergen University Library
- Epos (library ship)
- Rogaland County Library
- Sogn og Fjordane County Library, Førde
- Stavanger University Library
- Western Norway University of Applied Sciences library, Bergen

== See also ==
- BIBSYS government entity
- Mass media in Norway
- Norwegian literature
- Open access in Norway

in Norwegian

- Norwegian Library Association (in Norwegian)
- Norwegian Library Authority, 1949-2002 (in Norwegian)
