= Arne Ranslet =

Danish sculptor and ceramist

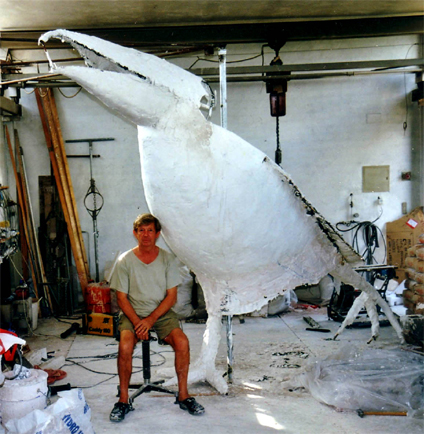
- Arne Ranslet, 2003.
- Born: 15 August 1931; Løgstør, Denmark
- Died: 24 April 2018 (aged 86)
- Known for: Sculptor, ceramist

Arne Mathias Ranslet (15 August 1931 – 24 April 2018) was a Danish sculptor and ceramist.

His works were purchased by museums and communities in Europe and gained worldwide recognition through international exhibitions. He has been acclaimed among the best known ceramists of Bornholm.

== Biography ==
Ranslet was born in Løgstør, Denmark, and started working with ceramic on his last year in the Birkerød gymnasium and later studied in the Royal Danish Academy of Fine Arts in Copenhagen (1951–1954), where he first met his later to be wife, the Norwegian painter Tulla Blomberg Ranslet. The couple married in 1955 and moved to Bornholm, where Ranslet later established his own workshop. The couple had two daughters and a son on the island: painter Pia Ranslet, sculptor Paul Ranslet and captain pilot Charlotte Pedersen.

During his first years on the island Ranslet worked mainly with ceramic, combining both traditional and modern elements in his art. He gradually moved from pottery to sculpturing in the 1970s, creating humoristic and sometimes grotesque animal sculptures, later replaced by more monumental bronze works in the 1980s. In 1988 the Ranslet couple moved to Spain, where they established a studio and workshop. Ranslet died in April 2018.

== Notable works ==
Ranslet's work in both ceramic and bronze has been purchased by various museums, institutions and collectors in Europe, including the Nationalmuseum in Stockholm, the Malmö Art Museum, the Museum of Decorative Arts and Design in Oslo, the Danish Museum of Art & Design, the Röhsska Museum of Design and Applied Art, Bornholm Museum, Stockholm Län Council, Jönköpings country museum, Norrköpings museum of art in Sweden, Östergötlands museum, the regional museum in Kristianstad, Sweden, Museum für Kunst und Gewerbe Hamburg, King Gustav Adolf's art collection, The Danish Arts Foundation, Trapholt Art Museum, La Casa Orduña Del Castell De Guadalest museum in Spain, Örebro läns museum.

- Guldgåsen (bronze 1992, Schlossplatz, Winsen / Luhe, Germany)

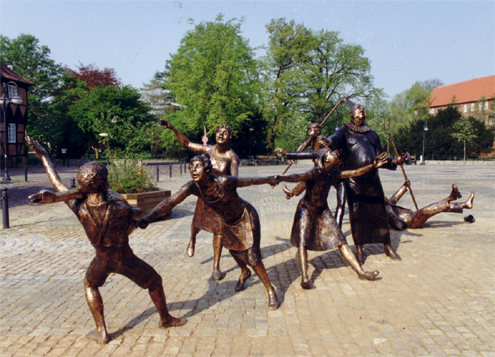
Guldgåsen in Winsen, Germany

The sculpture is an adaptation of the famous fairytale by the brothers Grimm. It was bought by the Winsen municipality and placed in front of the 13th century Winsen Castle.

- Mand Med Bulldog Og Kat (bronze 1989, Winsen / Luhe, Germany)

The sculpture won the first award in an art contest in Winsen, Germany, in 1988, and was situated in front of the savings bank that sponsored the event. Before its presentation to the public the sculpture was mistakenly reported to local police as a 'wrapped dead man' in an event covered by the local press.

- Metamorphose (bronze 1983, Allinge church, Bornholm, Denmark)

Metamorphose symbolizes the transformation from human to angel. It was purchased by Sparekassen Bornholms Fond and situated in front of the historical church in Allinge.

- Tubaspilleren (bronze, 1982, Frederikshavn Municipality, Denmark; 1985, Harburg, Hamburg, Germany)

The sculpture is situated in front of the City hall in Frederikshavn and was borrowed for an exhibition in Hamburg in 1985, where a similar artefact was later ordered with permission from Frederikshavn municipality. It is said that if the board of the municipality should ever agree on any matter the Tuba player will toot the horn.

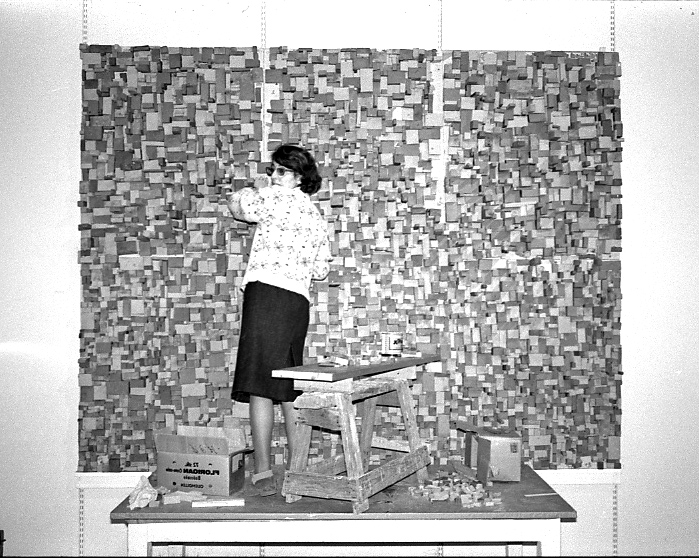
Tulla Ranslet (Blomberg) in front of Millionbyen, a ceramic relief by Arne Ranslet. Form in Malmo, 1965

Most of Ranslet's exhibitions took place in Denmark, Sweden, Norway and Germany, but his art has also been exhibited in Spain, Italy, Switzerland, France and the USA. Ranslet's works were also exhibited on Bornholm numerous times while the couple was living on the island and afterwards.

== Other selected works ==
- Hængebugsvin (Stoneware 1984, kannikegaarden, Aakirkeby, Bornholm, Denmark)
- Den Løpende Bulldog (Bronze 1985, Hasle, Bornholm, Denmark)
- Gammel Kvinde (bronze 1985, Royal Caroline Institute, Sweden; Oldenburg, Germany; 1988, Tårnby Municipality, Denmark)
- Livets Tråd (Bronze 2003, Svanekegaarden, Bornholm, Denmark)
- Kat (bronze 1985, Stavanger Municipality, Norway)
- Bevæbnet (bronze 1966)
- Hotdog (bronze 1985)
- Middagslur (bronze 1987, Rådhuset, Buchholz in der Nordheide Municipality, Germany)
- Grisegruppe (Stoneware 1987, Hanstedt, Germany)
- Liggende Hankat (bronze 1981, Hvidovre monsipality, Denmark; Stavanger, Norway; Bad Kreuznach, Germany)
- Millionbyen (Ceramic 1963, Stockholm, Sweden)
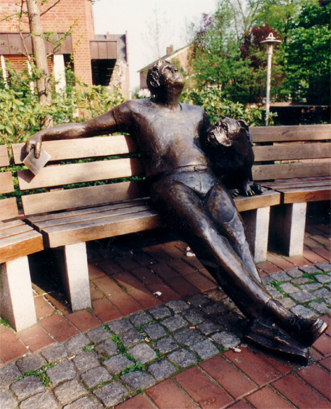
Mand Med Bulldog Og Kat, bronze
