= Pia Ranslet =

Danish artist

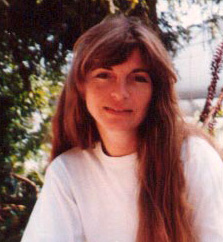
- Pia Ranslet.
- Born: 3 July 1956 (age 66); Allinge, Bornholm, Denmark
- Known for: Painting, Graphics and sculpting

Pia Ranslet (born 3 July 1956) is a Danish painter and sculptor.

== Biography ==
Pia Ranslet was born and raised in Bornholm, Denmark, eldest daughter to Tulla Blomberg Ranslet and Arne Ranslet. Her brother is sculptor Paul Ranslet. After graduating from high school she registered at Copenhagen University, studying Art history. In 1976 she enrolled in Danmarks Designskole and after receiving her diploma proceeded studying at Konstfack University-college in Stockholm, while teaching art students. From 1980 to 1986 she studied art at the Royal Swedish Academy of Arts in Stockholm, where she was granted several scholarships allowing her to study in India, New York City and Egypt. She continued teaching art at Bornholms Højskole and Thorstedlund Kunsthøjskolen in Frederikssund. Ranslet is married and has three sons.

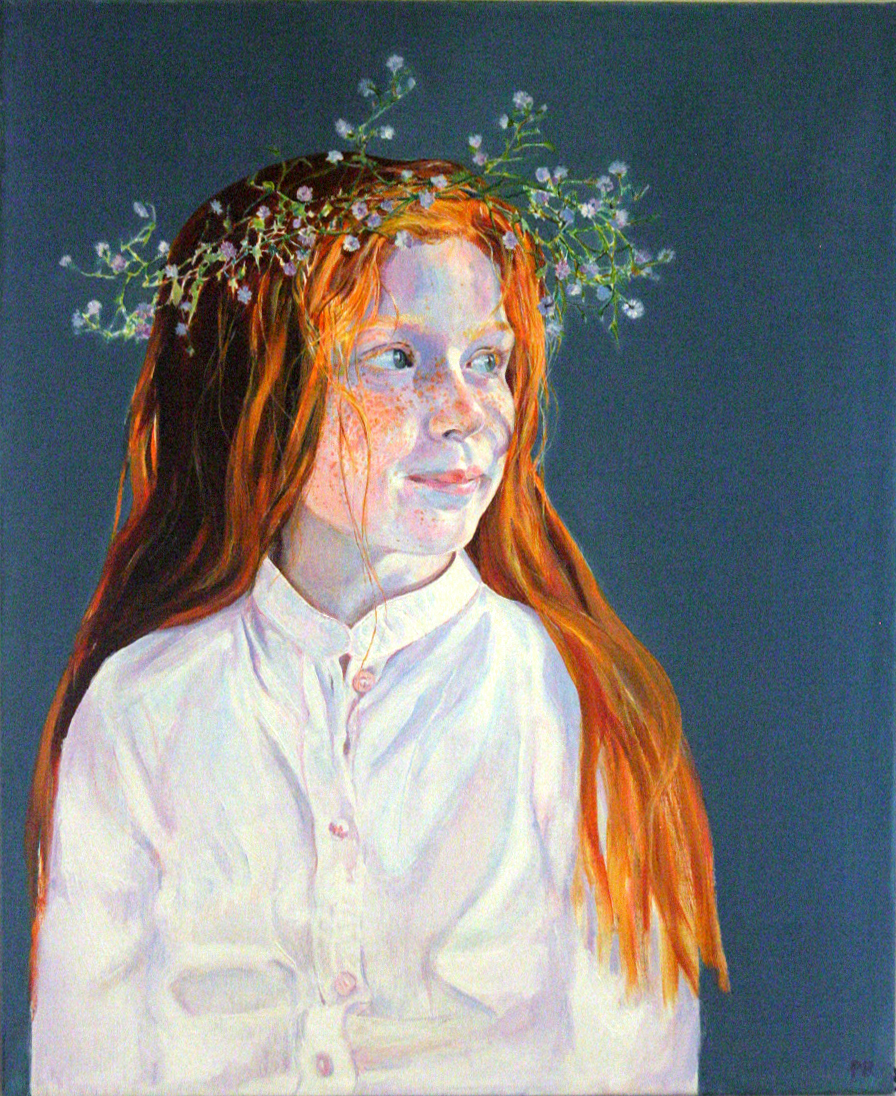
Anna Ranslet, acryl on canvas portrait by Pia Ranslet

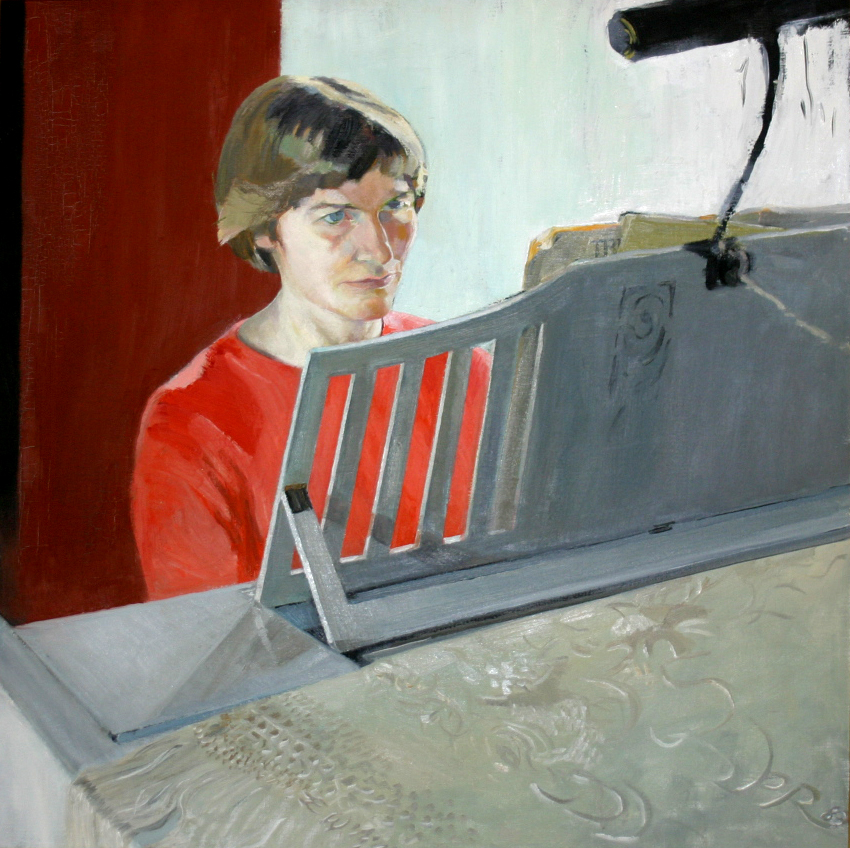
Elisabeth Westenholz, Oil paint on canvas portrait by Pia Ranslet

== Art ==
Ranslet's work stretches between expressionism and realism. She paints in front of her motives, and is a classic portraitist. Her landscapes feature mostly Bornholm-countryside views. She has solo-exhibited in many European countries, including: Denmark, Sweden, Germany, Luxembourg, France, Belgium, Spain and Switzerland. She is publicly represented in the National Swedish Arts Council, National Labour Market Board (Arbetsmarknadsstyrelsen), and the Swedish Employers' Confederation.

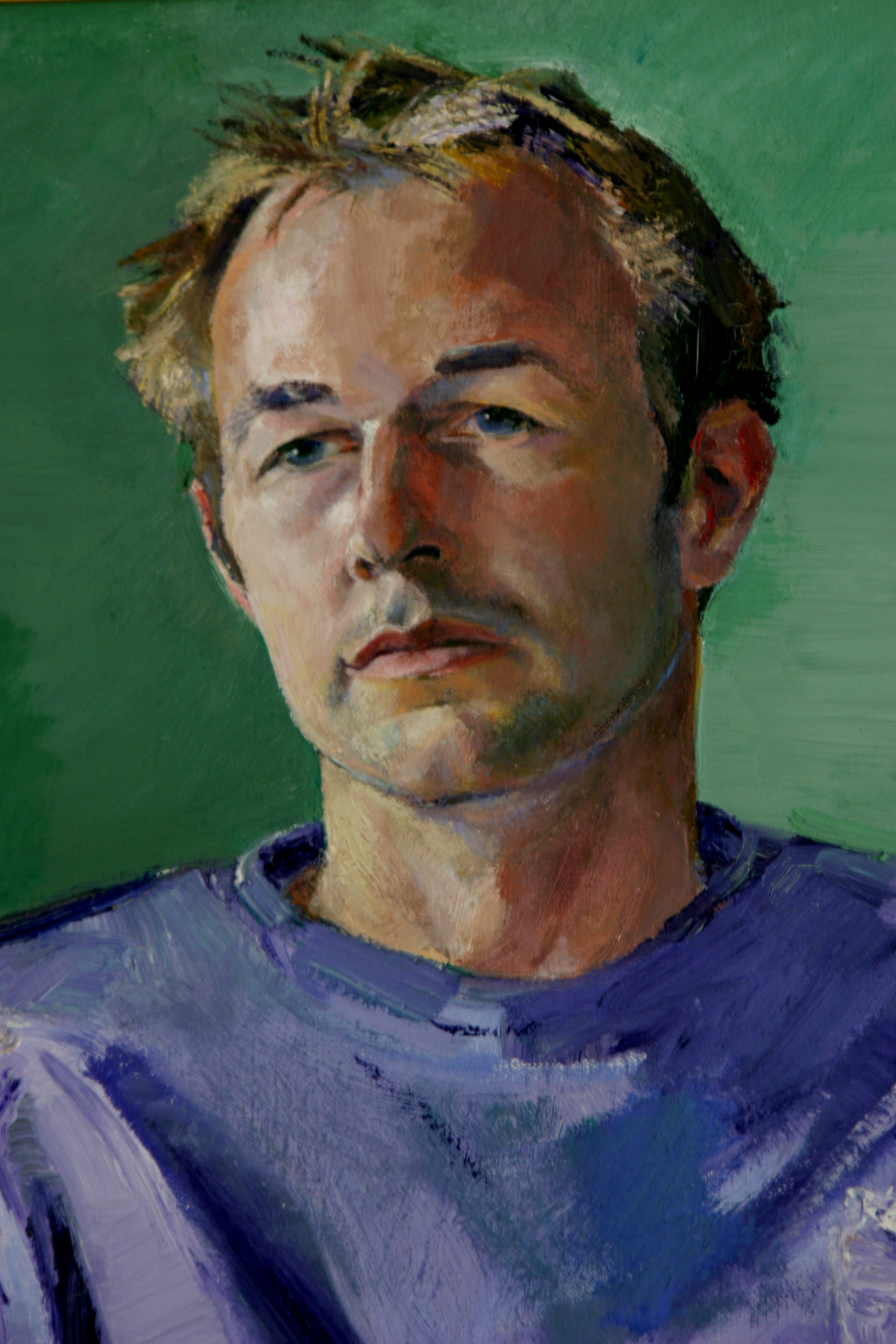
"Anders Westenholz", Oil paint on canvas

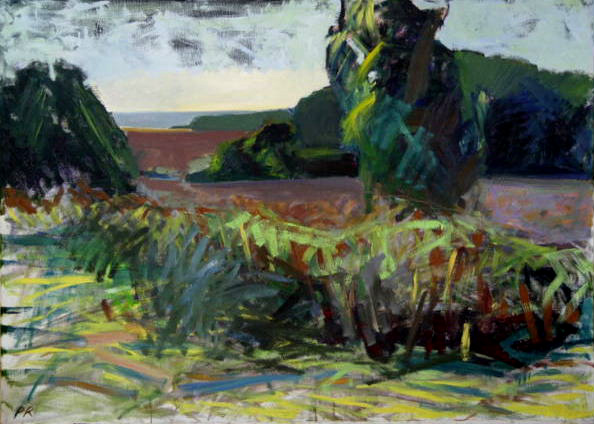
"Bornholm landscape", Oil paint on canvas

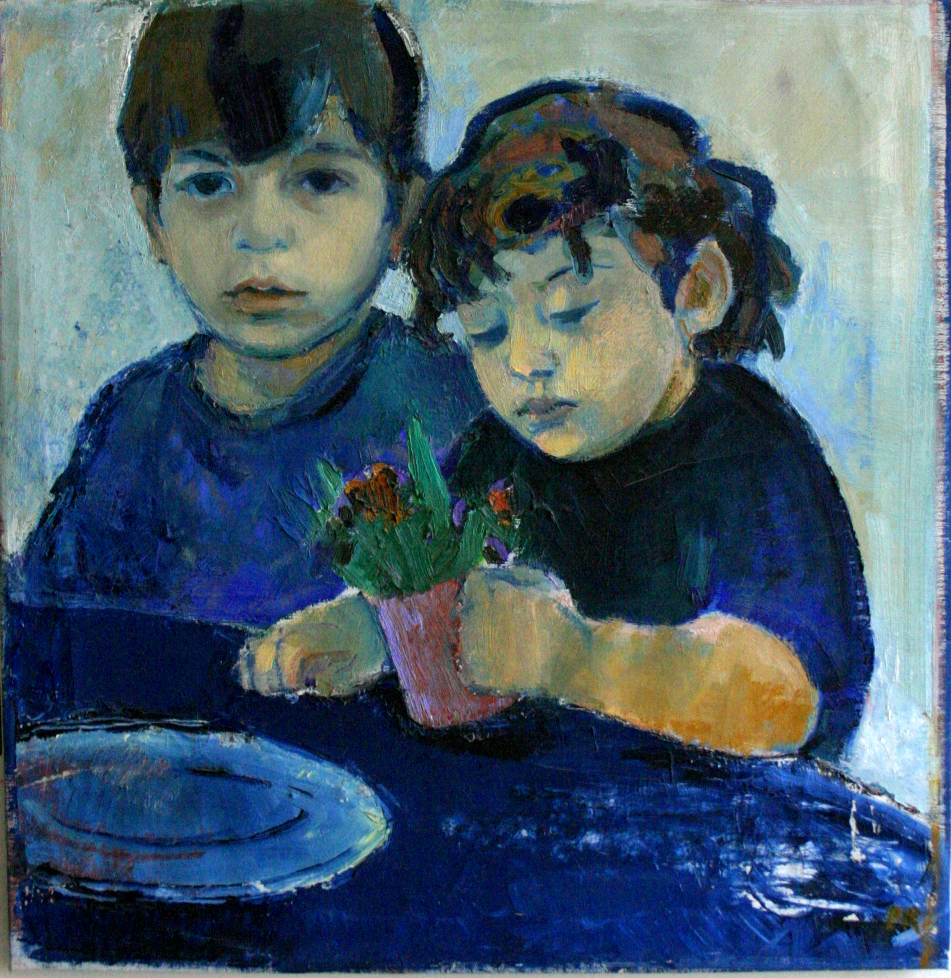
"Brothers", Oil paint on canvas

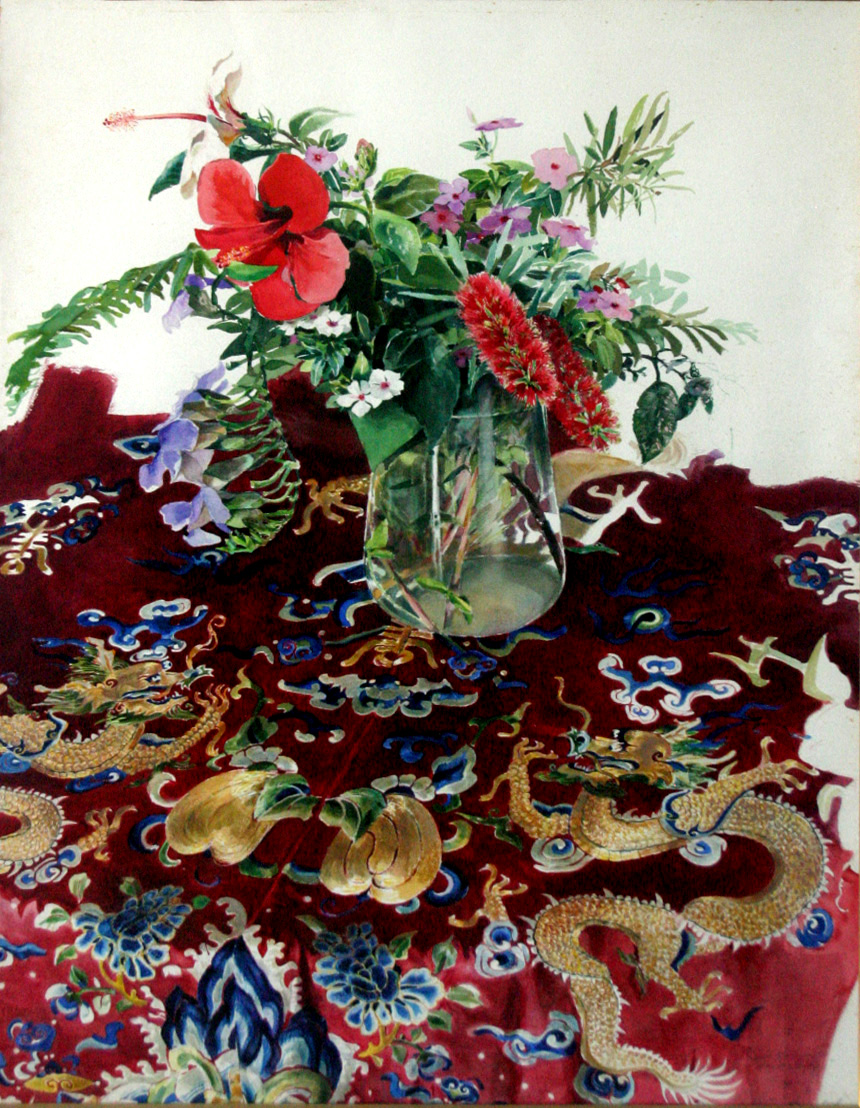
"Chinese Emperor Costume", Watercolors
