= Montalbán de Córdoba =

- Municipality
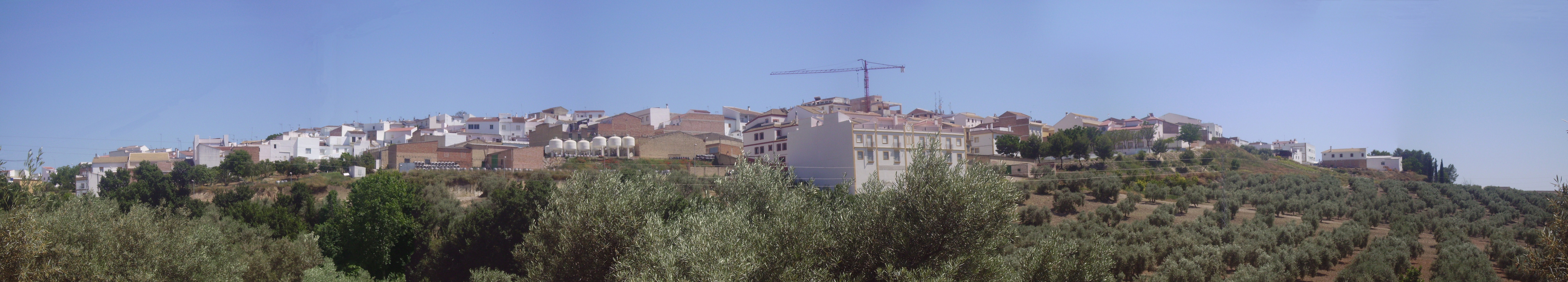

- Flag Coat of arms

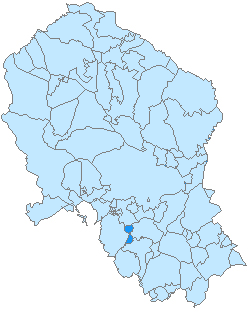
- Location in the province of Córdoba

- Location in Spain
- Coordinates: 37°35′N 4°45′W
- Country: Spain
- Autonomous community: Andalusia
- Province: Córdoba
- Comarca: Campiña Sur
- Judicial district: Montilla

Government
  - Alcalde: Miguel Ruz Salces (2011) (IU)

Area
  - Total: 33.66 km^{2} (13.00 sq mi)
- Elevation: 273 m (896 ft)
- Highest elevation: 349 m (1,145 ft)

Population (2025-01-01)
  - Total: 4,401
  - Density: 130.7/km^{2} (338.6/sq mi)
- Demonym: Montalbeño /-a
- Time zone: UTC+1 (CET)
  - Summer (DST): UTC+2 (CEST)
- Postal code: 14548
- Dialing code: (+34) 957 31X XXX
- Patron Saint: Francis of Assisi
- Website: www.aytomontalban.com

Montalbán de Córdoba is a town in the province of Córdoba in Andalusia, southern Spain. The town is 42 km from Córdoba, the capital of the province.

It is widely known for its cultivation of garlic, being the top producer in Andalusia and producing 37% of the garlic consumed in the European Union.

== Etymology ==
The town's name comes from Latin MONTE·ALBANVM, meaning "White Mountain", which evolved into its actual name. This name was origined by the hill the town sits upon, composed of white limestone. The first time the town is mentioned is on the 15th century by the name of "Monte Alván".

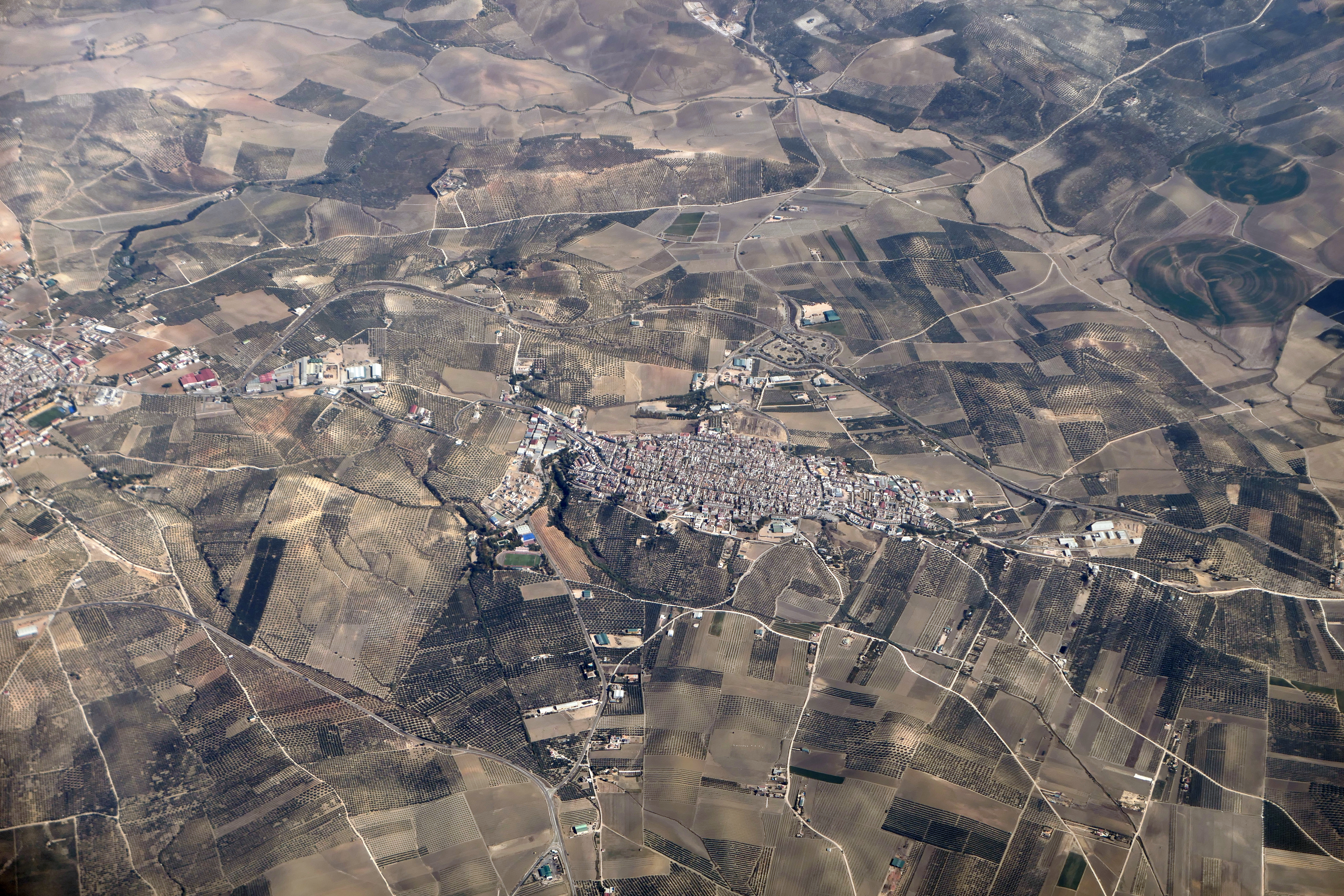
Aerial view of Montalbán de Córdoba and the land around it.

== History ==
- Prehistory: Remnants of pottery were found 4 km to the south of the town. At present they are in the archaeological museum of Cordoba.
- 3rd century BC: Near Montalban was an old Roman city known as Segovia.
- 210 BC: Romans and Carthaginians fought in a battle in the Second Punic War.
- 45 BC: Julius Caesar and Pompey's sons fought in a battle in Caesar's civil war. Segovia vanishes from the historical record.
- 4th century to 5th century AD: Ruins and a catacomb are found in Tentecarreta 2 km from the town.
- 1530: Fernandez of Cordoba established Montalban.
- 1668: Montalban had a population of 1,040.
- 1808-1812: French invaders burn the municipal file of Montalban and the history of the town is lost.
- 1880: Montalban had a population of 3,000.
- 1910: Montalban had a population of 3,300.
- 1960: Montalban had a population of 4,700, but shrunk to 3,800 due to emigration.

== Demographics ==
Historical population

| Year | Pop. | ±% p.a. |
|---|---|---|
| 1999 | 4,573 | — |
| 2000 | 4,558 | −0.33% |
| 2001 | 4,561 | +0.07% |
| 2002 | 4,510 | −1.12% |
| 2003 | 4,520 | +0.22% |

| Year | Pop. | ±% p.a. |
|---|---|---|
| 2004 | 4,609 | +1.97% |
| 2005 | 4,602 | −0.15% |
| 2006 | 4,621 | +0.41% |
| 2007 | 4,646 | +0.54% |
| 2008 | 4,626 | −0.43% |

== Representative buildings and places of interest ==
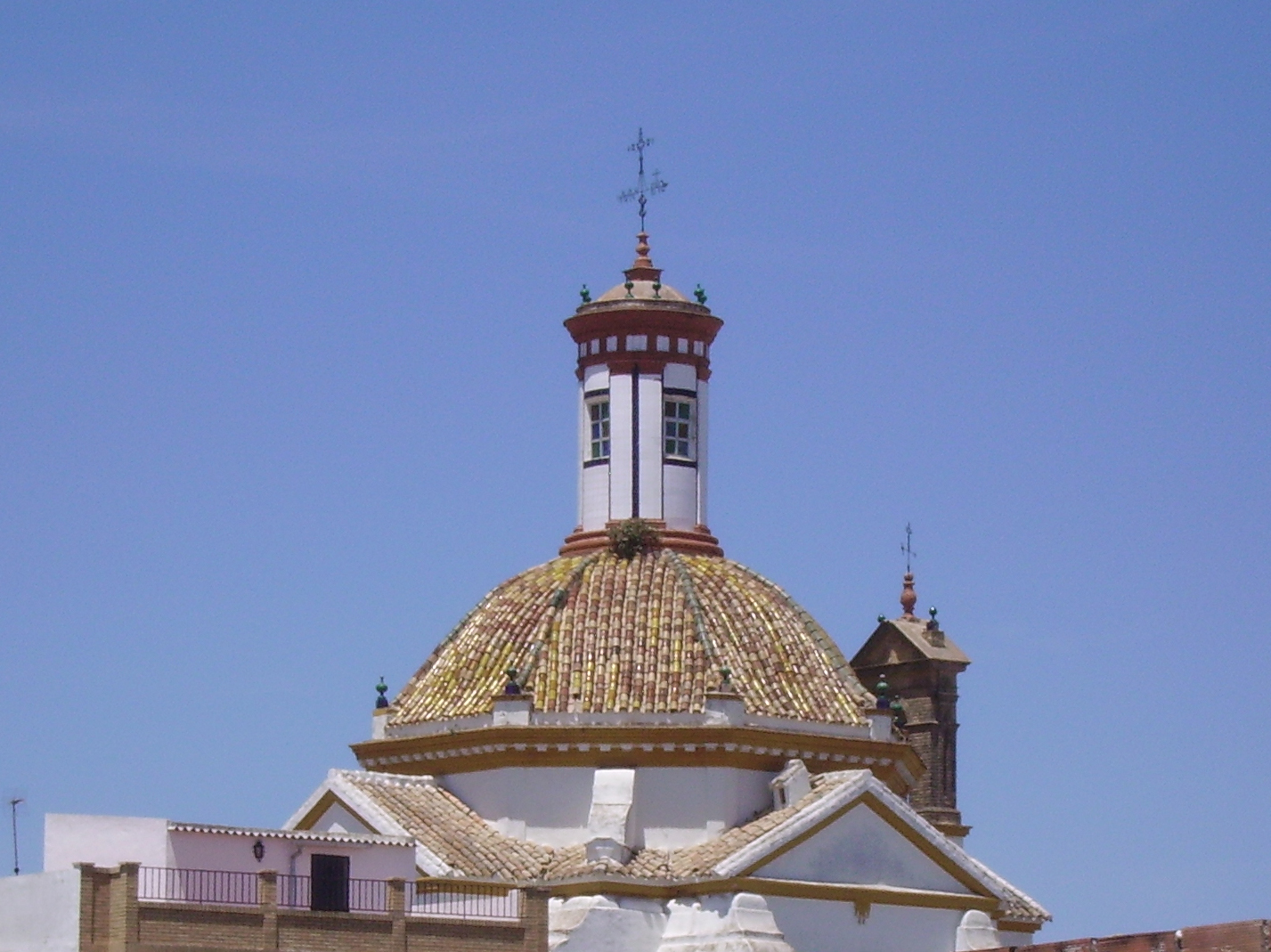
Dome of El Calvario.

=== El Calvario ===
El Calvario is in the south part of Montalbán, inside the town limits. The original Calvario hermitage, built during the first half of the 17th century, was a small church on the outskirts of Montalbán, near the old castle ruins. The building construction used poor quality material and it was soon found to be in a state of near ruin. Construction of a new chapel at the site of the first began in 1773 and was completed in 1776. This chapel, though stronger than the previous one, unfortunately was also built with inferior materials, so that, at the end of March 1852, the lantern and the dome of the chapel collapsed.

After consultation with competent builders, the second Chapel was torn down and rebuilt from the ground at its new location in town. The work was completed in July 1856, and the image of Nuestro Padre Jesús del Calvario was returned to the new chapel on August 25, upon which the village celebrated with the ringing of bells, illuminations, temporary triumphal arches, and buntings hung on edifices. The building is decorated in Neoclassical style; its exterior is rather plainly finished in white stucco, while the dome and roof lantern cupola are tiled. The church is consecrated to Nuestro Padre Jesús del Calvario (Our Father Jesus of Calvary); his image is in the altarpiece, which is worked in the Sevillian style. The building's ground plan is cruciform, in the shape of a Greek cross.

The archway by the artist Francisco Suarez was preserved in the chapel. The guesthouse was built in 1866 in order to accommodate pilgrims who arrived daily in fulfillment of their sacred vows.

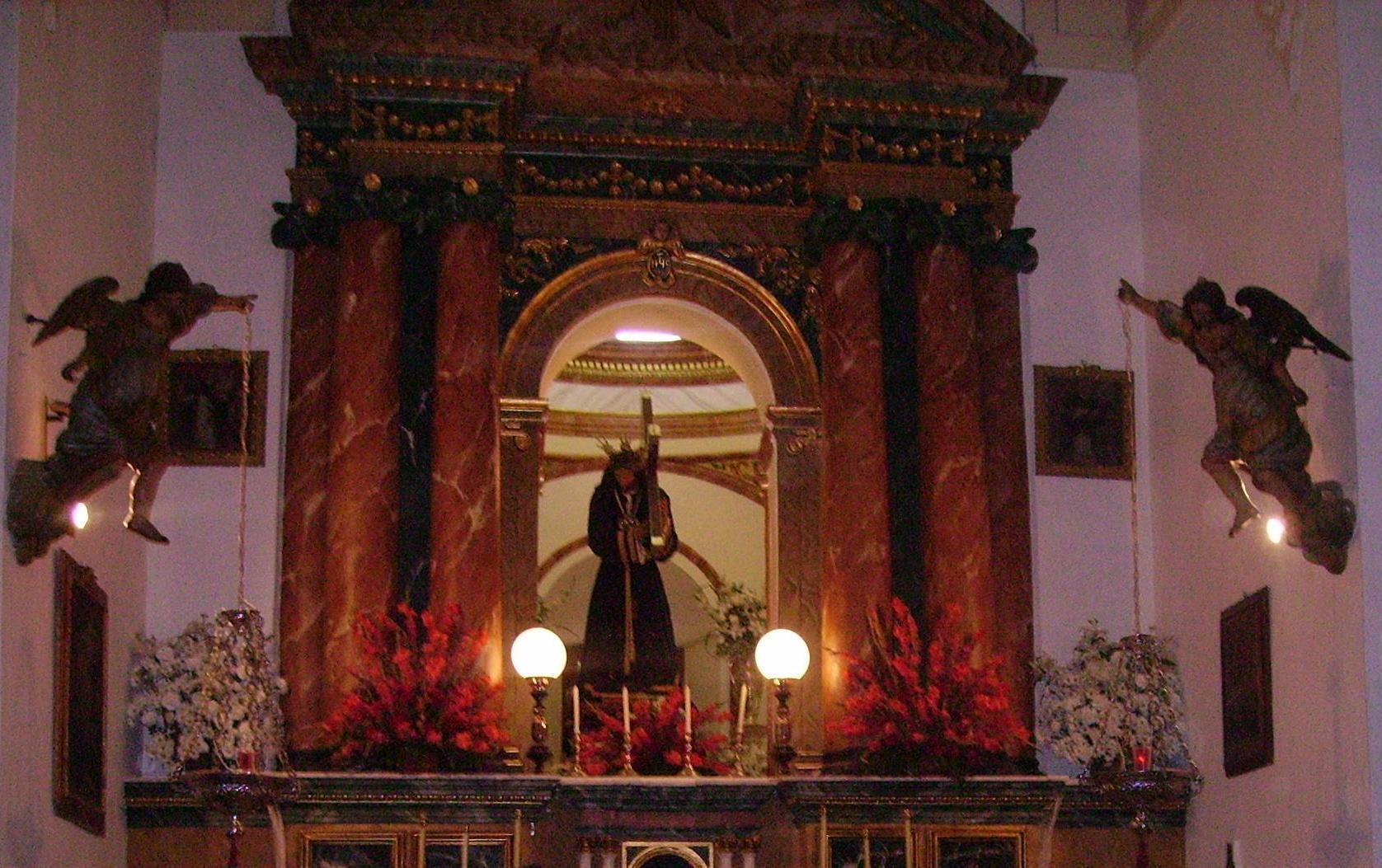
Calvary chapel, Montalbán de Córdoba

In the same year the House of the Santeros (image-carvers) was raised with the fencing and arched gates of the entrance court. The dedication of the new chapel was given by Major Master Ecija, D. Corrales Jose Martinez, who explained its relationship to the architecture of Seville.

The building has been maintained in recent years by minor works such as the paving of the courtyard entrance, roof-work and the restoration of the guesthouse and the House of the Santeros.

=== Madre de Dios Hermitage ===
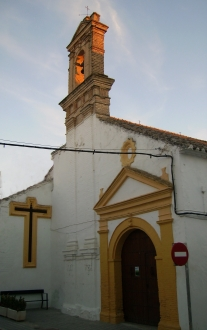
Madre de Dios Hermitage.

This church was declared a historic artistic monument in 1981, and a historical heritage of Andalusia in 1996. Located on the corner of Madre de Dios Street and Ancha Street, it is a three nave church. It was called Nuestra Señora de los Remedios from the 16th century to 1850. Presently the building is closed, although Mass is occasionally celebrated.

=== Santa María de Gracia Church ===
This is a parish church situated in the Andalusia square, facing the town hall. The church is made of brick and built in oval form. The interior has a small altar dedicated to the Immaculate Conception, a baroque altarpiece and ruins of the old church, which was demolished in 1964. It has pieces of metalsmithery from the old building incorporated in the golden parish cross, the silver monstrance and the shrine's door. The church appears to be built in the style of the 14th century, of Gothic architecture. It is 25 m long, 17 m broad and 10 m high, and has three naves. The walls are vaulted and the central nave has a coffered ceiling. The church has more than a dozen altars; the main altar (1724) is the work of the sculptor Gaspar Lorenzo de los Cobos. The church has two entry portals, one in the front and another in back, both with ogival arches. It also has a belltower with four bells and a rich Treasure of fine goldsmithery.

=== Culture House ===
This building was built on La Paz Street in 1984, when the democratic town hall arrived. It has two floors, with a total area of 250 m^{2}. It served as the town hall while a new one was built. Cultural activities including lectures and social gatherings, public and official ceremonies, and general presentations take place here. At present the first floor is an adult education center and the main hall; the second floor houses the municipal library.

=== Library ===
The present town library was inaugurated in 1986. Until 1990 it was situated on the second floor of the old medical center, now the Office for Youth Information (Oficina de Informacion Juvenil). At that time, the library had 1300 volumes. In 1990 it was moved to the second floor of the Culture House; at this writing the library has over 7000 volumes.

=== Tentecarreta Catacombs ===
Tentecarreta is 2 km from Montalban. Large underground galleries were found here which served as a necropolis during the 4th and 5th centuries. These galleries form catacombs which were rare in most localities of the Roman Empire; the catacombs of Montalban are the only such catacombs in Spain. Tentecarreta has two galleries, crossed and oriented to the cardinal points. The galleries are narrow, tortuous, and heavily eroded due to humidity, collapses and avalanches of mud. The south gallery housed a collective burial.

=== El Mesto ===
The Mesto was an old tree, a hybrid between one species, evergreen oak, and another, cork oak, located about 7 km from Montalban. During the 8th century it provided shade, shelter and rest for peasants and travellers. The ancient tree measured 15 m in circumference, but it was severely damaged when someone built a fire in a hollow in its trunk. In 1980, an association was founded for its preservation, as the Mesto had long served as an inspiration to poets, writers and artists, arousing a special sensibility of appreciation for the beauty of nature. The Mesto was destroyed in the summer of 1995; yet it remains a symbol, and evokes a feeling for this beauty and a memory of something deeply meaningful being lost.

== Festivals ==
=== August Fair ===
The fair is celebrated during August 6–8, in honour of Nuestro Padre Jesús del Calvario; this is harvest time for area farms and the end of the season for agriculture generally.

=== Romería ===
The pilgrimage is celebrated on May 15 in honour of Saint Isidore the Laborer. Almost everyone in town goes to Huerta Dios, a distance of around one kilometre. For around half the morning there is a procession headed by the coach of Saint Isidore's devotees, followed by other coaches, horsemen, and people in traditional costumes.

== See also ==
- List of municipalities in Córdoba
