= Ransley =

Ransley is a name which can serve as a given name and as a surname.

Notable people with the given name:

- Ransley Thacker (1891–1965), British lawyer and judge
- Ransley Victor Garland (born 1934), Australian politician and diplomat

Notable people with the surname:

- Frank Ransley, (1897–1992), British World War I flying ace
- Harry C. Ransley (1863–1941), American politician
- Peter Ransley (1931–2026), British screenwriter, playwright, and novelist
- Tom Ransley (born 1985), British rower

See also

- Ransley Apartment Building, is a historic apartment building in the Walnut Hills neighborhood of Cincinnati, Ohio, United States
