= Dunker Culture House =

Museum in Helsingborg, Sweden

Coordinates: 56.0478°N 12.6892°E

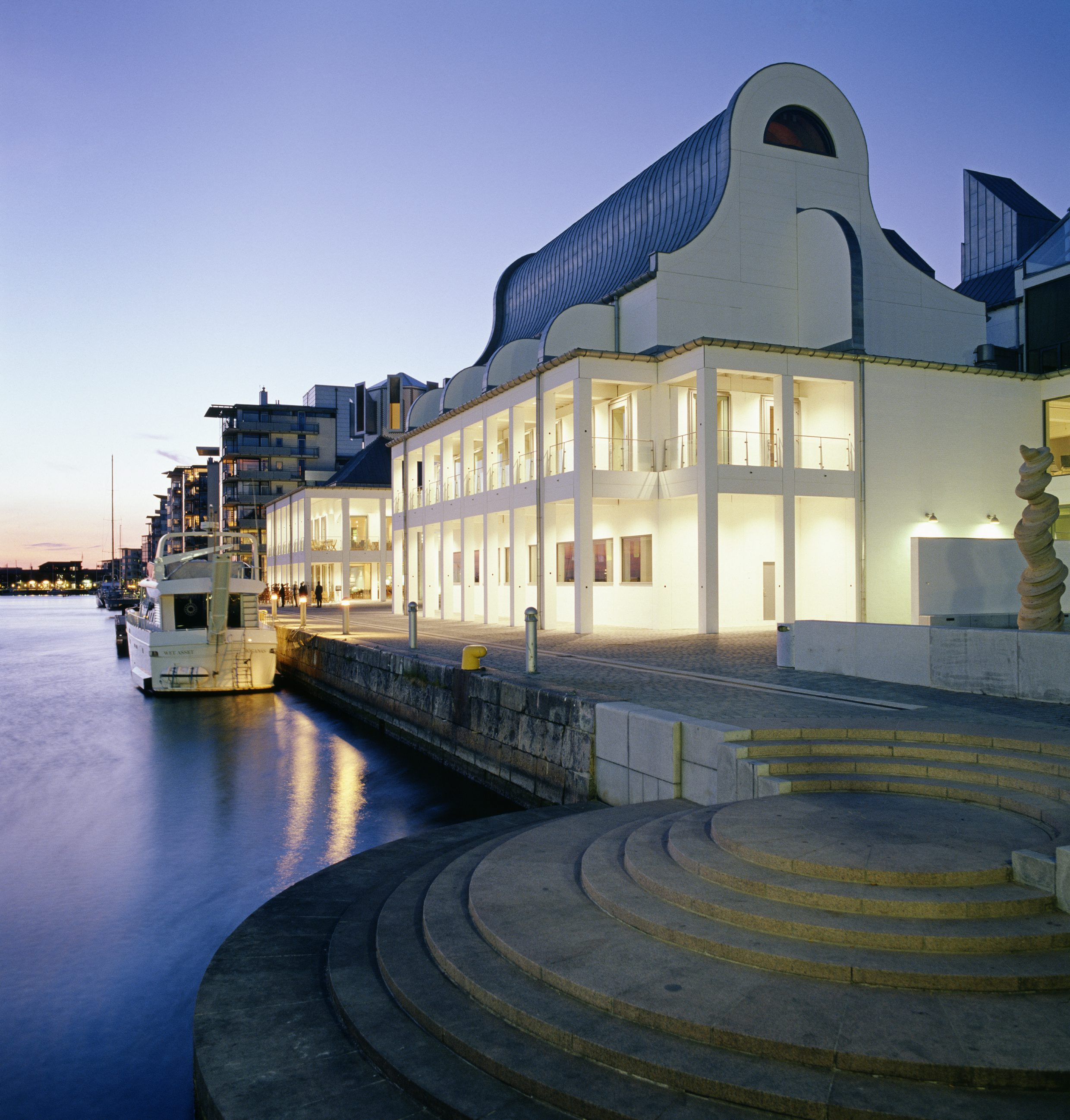
Dunker Culture House

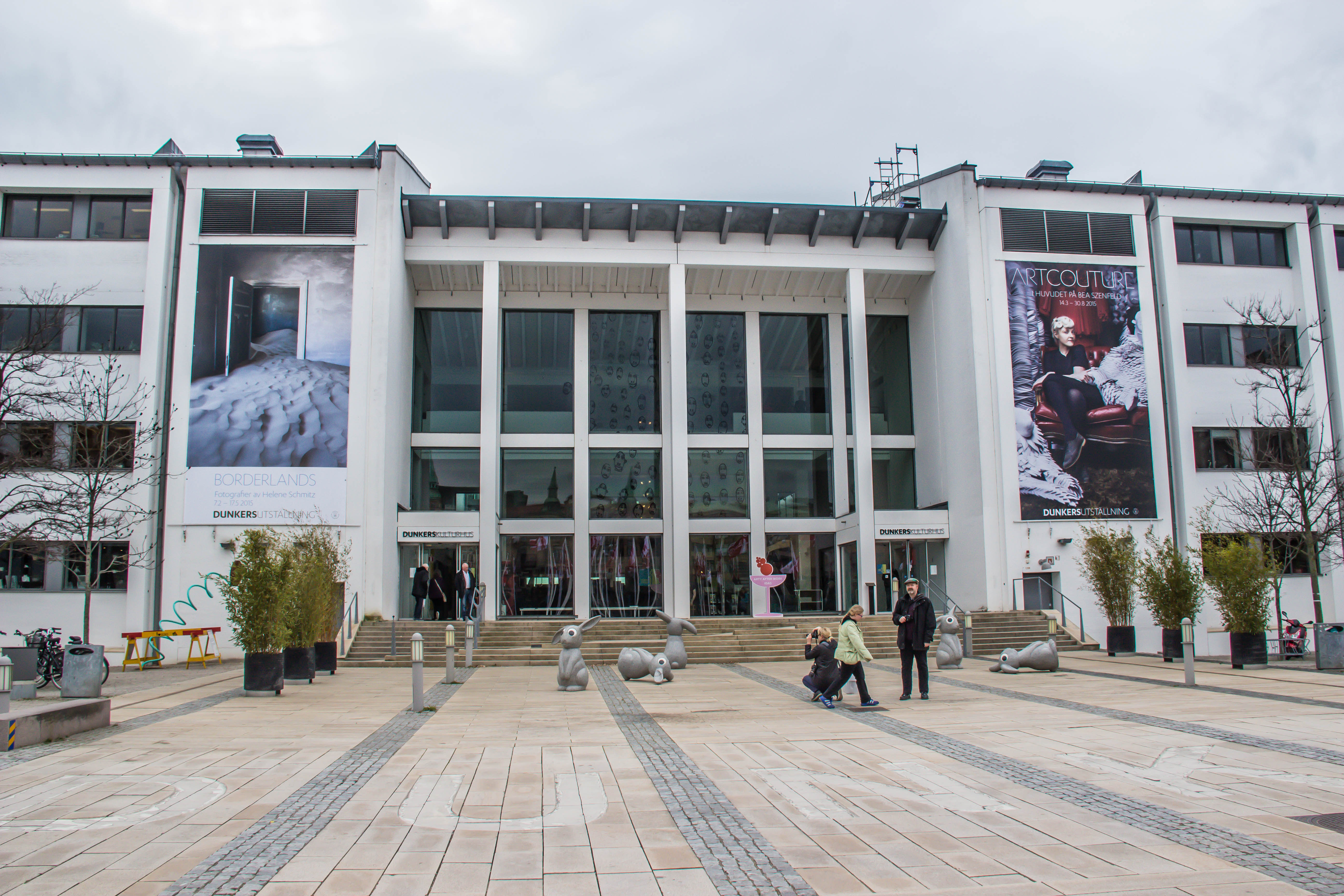
Main Entrance and Facade

Dunker Culture House (Swedish: Dunkers kulturhus) is a museum and art centre located in Helsingborg, Sweden. It is the museum of Helsingborg cultural heritage and its theme is to trace history from the ice age to the modern day.

The building was designed by Danish architect Kim Utzon and was named after entrepreneur and industrialist Henry Dunker (1870-1962). Funding for the building was provided by the Henry and Gerda Dunker's donation fund (Henry och Gerda Dunkers donationsfond). Henry Dunker who was a local businessman who owned and operated Helsingborg's largest employer, the polymer, rubber and plastics manufacturer Trelleborg. A year before Dunker died in 1962 he was chair of the board of his company Trelleborgs Gummifabriks AB. The business employed 24,000 people with 50 outlets internationally.

Dunker Culture House was opened on the 27th April 2002 by Crown Princess Victoria. The total cost for the building, including its interiors, was 300 million kronor.
