= Trelleborg (company) =

Engineering company in Sweden

Trelleborg AB

- Headquarters in Trelleborg, Sweden
- Type: Public (Aktiebolag)
- Traded as: Nasdaq Stockholm: TREL B
- Industry: Polymer engineering
- Founded: 1905; 121 years ago
- Founders: Henry Dunker; Johan Kock
- Headquarters: Trelleborg, Sweden
- Area served: Worldwide
- Key people: Johan Malmquist (Chairman); Peter Nilsson (President and CEO)
- Products: Seals, Hoses, Antivibration Solutions, Fenders
- Revenue: 34 billion kr (2023)
- Operating income: 7,368,000,000 Swedish krona (2023)
- Net income: 10,075 million kr (2023)
- Total equity: 41,727 million kr (2023)
- Number of employees: 15,646 (2023)
- Divisions: Trelleborg Industrial Solutions; Trelleborg Sealing Solutions; Trelleborg Medical Solutions
- Website: trelleborg.com

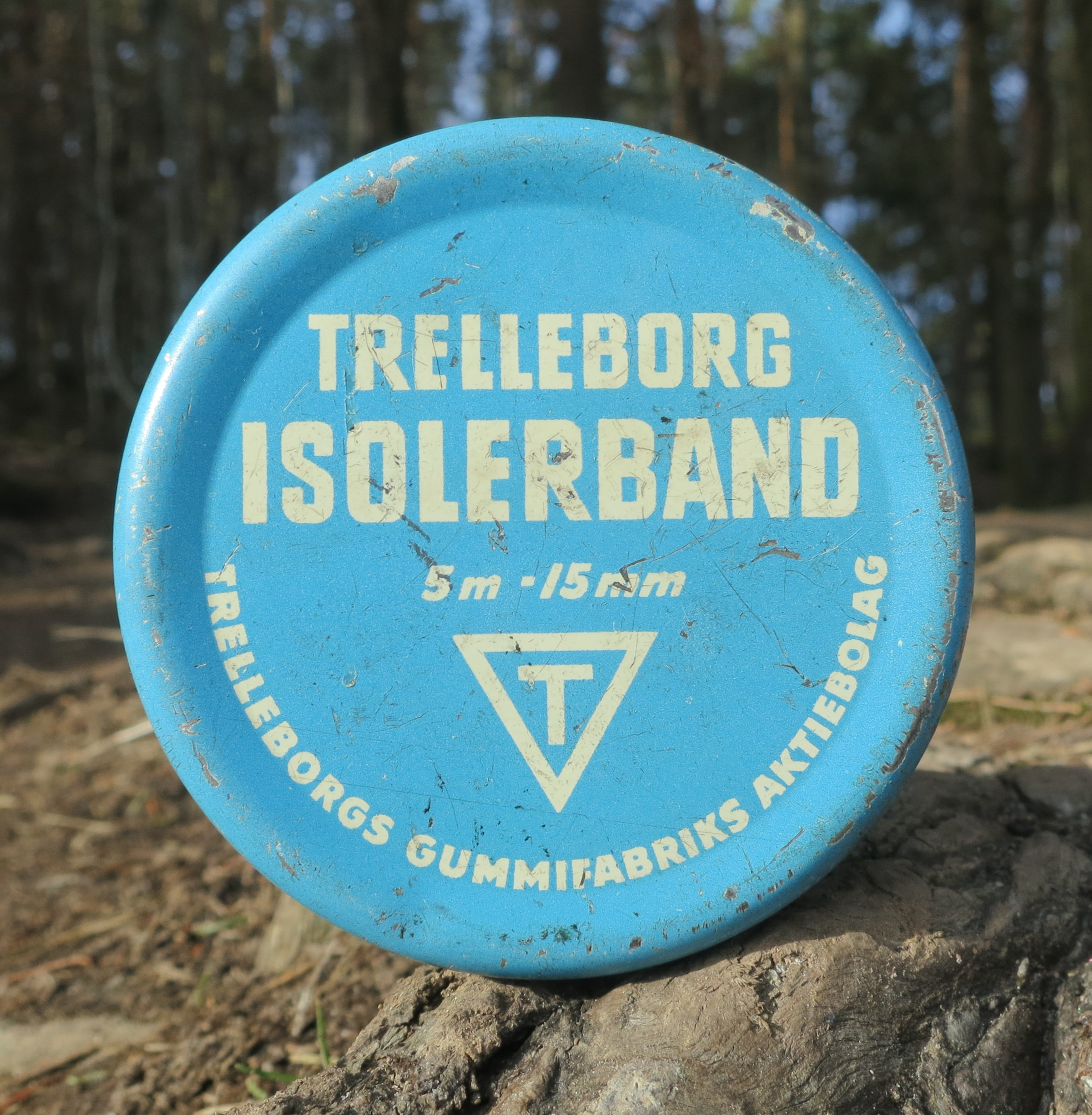
1970s electrical tape by Trelleborgs Gummifabriks AB, subsequently Trelleborg AB.

Trelleborg AB is a multi-national engineering company headquartered in Trelleborg, Sweden. Trelleborg focuses on the designing and manufacturing of polymer technology, their main products include seals, hoses and antivibration solutions. According to the Financial Times, the company currently employs 15.65k people and has earned 34.17 billion SEK in revenue. The company became public in 1964 and currently trades on Nasdaq Stockholm.

== History ==
The company was founded by Henry Dunker and Johan Kock as "Trelleborgs Gummifabriks AB" (the Rubber Factory Corporation of Trelleborg). The company had 150 employees and produced bicycle tires and rubber for industrial applications. During World War I, the Swedish Armed Forces placed substantial orders.

By the mid-1930s, the number of employees had reached 1,000. Beginning in the 1950s, Trelleborgs Gummifabriks AB was floated at the Stockholm Stock Exchange. Its current name was adopted in 1977.

Between 1983 and 1991, the company's scope broadened to the areas of mining and metals. In 1999, the scope was narrowed due to specialisation into industrial applications. In 2003, Trelleborg AB acquired the German manufacturer Busak+Shamban and started manufacturing polymer-based precision seals under the Trelleborg name.

In 2009, the European Commission fined several marine hose producers, including Trelleborg AB, "...for participating in a cartel for marine hoses between 1986 and 2007 in violation of the ban on cartels and restrictive business practices in the EC Treaty (Article 81) and the EEA Agreement (Article 53)."

In mid-2012, Trelleborg and Freudenberg formed a 50–50 joint venture in anti-vibration applications for light and heavy vehicles, called TrelleborgVibracoustic. Trelleborg ended this and divested its shares in this venture to Freudenberg in 2016.

In 1990, Trelleborg acquired a 50% stake in Falconbridge Nickel Mines (the Canadian company Noranda Mines acquiring the other half), giving it a significant footprint in nickel production, which had not previously been major part of its or Boliden's portfolio at that point.

In 2022, Trelleborg acquired the Lindau-based aerospace interiors company, MG Silikon GmbH, an entity within Saint-Gobain Group, and the US-based company Minnesota Rubber & Plastics from the private equity firm KKR for US$950 million.

In 2025, Trelleborg AB announced that they would be acquiring Aero-Plastics Inc.

== Operations ==
Trelleborg AB is divided into the following business areas:

- Trelleborg Industrial Solutions (hose systems, industrial anti-vibration solutions and selected industrial sealing systems)
- Trelleborg Sealing Solutions (precision seals for industry, aviation, and vehicles) – Founded in 1952, Trelleborg Sealing Solutions was previously a part of the Smiths Group's precision seals business. This business, Polymer Sealing Solutions, consisted of four rubber units. These were Busak+Shamban, Dowty Automotive, Shamban and Forsheda. In 2003, Polymer Sealing Solutions was acquired by Trelleborg AB. The name Busak+Shamban remained with all marketing locations, but the manufacturing locations became known as Trelleborg Sealing Solutions. As of April 2, 2007, the Busak+Shamban name was retired, with all locations being brought under the Trelleborg Sealing Solutions umbrella.
- Trelleborg Medical Solutions – A global supplier of polymer-based integrated solutions for medical devices and biopharma

== Market ==
In 2018, Trelleborg AB was the third-largest player in the world market for non-tire rubber products according to Rubber & Plastics News.

Ranking by sales	Company	Country
1	Continental AG	Germany
2	Hutchinson SA	France
3	Trelleborg AB	Sweden
4	Freudenberg Group	Germany
5	Bridgestone	Japan
6	NOK Inc.	Japan
7	Sumitomo Riko	Japan
8	Pinafore Holdings B.V.	United Kingdom
9	Cooper-Standard Automotive	United States
10	Parker Hannifin	United States

The net sales for 2022 had the following geographical distribution:

Region	Share of sales
Europe	46%
North and South America	33%
Asia and other markets	21%

== Ownership ==
The 10 largest shareholders of Trelleborg AB, as of December 31, 2023:

No	Shareholder	Percent of share capital	Percent of votes
1	Henry Dunker Donation Fund & Foundations (Note: All of the Series A shares are owned by the Dunker Funds and Foundations, which were created through testamentary disposition by the founder of the Helsingborg and Trelleborg rubber-production plants, Henry Dunker.)	11.33%	55.78%
2	Allianz Global Investors	4.97%	2.48%
3	Capital Group	4.15%	2.07%
4	Vanguard	3.31%	1.65%
5	Swedbank Robur Funds	2.65%	1.32%
6	Handelsbanken Funds	2.15%	1.07%
7	Norges Bank	1.84%	0.92%
8	Lannebo Funds	1.79%	0.89%
9	BlackRock	1.73%	0.87%
10	Folksam	1.61%	0.80%

== Governance ==
Since April 27, 2023, Johan Malmquist has been Chairman of Trelleborg AB. The following table lists the chairmen in chronological order since the company was founded.

Period	Chairman
August 24, 1905 – December 18, 1909	Gustaf Lagergren
December 19, 1909 – May 1, 1945	Johan Kock
May 2, 1945 – May 3, 1962	Henry Dunker
May 17, 1962 – May 24, 1965	Lars Gunnar Ohlsson
May 25, 1965 – May 25, 1970	Hadar Hallström
May 26, 1970 – May 17, 1976	Lars Gunnar Ohlsson
May 18, 1976 - May 30, 1985	Åke Ståhlbrandt
May 31, 1985 – May 30, 1990	Ernst Herslow
May 31, 1990 – April 23, 2002	Rune Andersson
April 24, 2002 – April 23, 2013	Anders Narvinger
April 24, 2013 – April 25, 2018	Sören Mellstig
April 26, 2018 – April 27, 2023	Hans Biörck
April 27, 2023 –	Johan Malmquist

Since October 1, 2005, Peter Nilsson has been president and CEO of Trelleborg AB. The following table lists the presidents and CEOs in chronological order since the company was founded.

Period	President and CEO
August 24, 1905 – May 17, 1947	Henry Dunker
September 1, 1939 – July 21, 1949 (at the time, the law permitted appointment of more than one CEO)	Hilding Ståhlbrandt
August 29, 1949 – May 17, 1976	Åke Ståhlbrandt
May 18, 1976 – April 30, 1983	Arne Lundqvist
May 1, 1983 – May 30, 1990	Rune Andersson
May 31, 1990 – January 26, 1999	Kjell Nilsson
January 27, 1999 – February 8, 1999	Hans Porat (temporary)
February 9, 1999 – September 30, 2005	Fredrik Arp
October 1, 2005 –	Peter Nilsson
