= Tulla Blomberg Ranslet =

Norwegian artist, sculptor (born 1928)

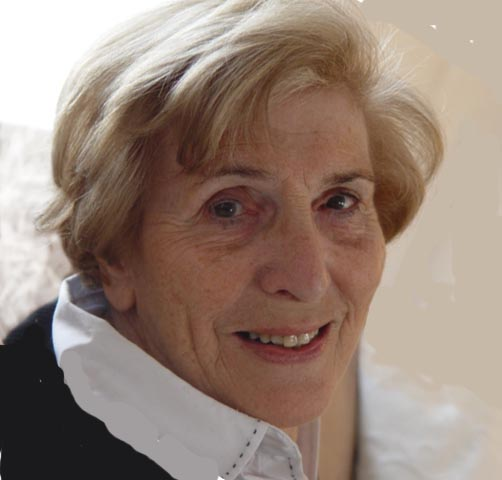
- Tulla Blomberg Ranslet.
- Born: 15 May 1928; Oslo, Norway
- Known for: Painting, Graphics and Ceramist
- Website: tulla.dk

Tulla (Bella) Blomberg Ranslet (born 15 May 1928, Oslo, Norway) is a Norwegian painter and sculptor.

== Biography ==
Ranslet (née Blomberg) attended Issac Grünewald school in Stockholm in 1946 and later studied in the Norwegian National Academy of Fine Arts under Prof. Per Krogh. Her first artistic appearance was with a wandering exhibition of Unge Kunstneres Samfund (U.K.S) in 1950. She was accepted to the Royal Danish Academy of Fine Arts the following year, where she met ceramist and sculptor Arne Ranslet. The two married in 1955 and moved to Bornholm where they had their three children – painter Pia Ranslet, sculptor Paul Ranslet and pilot Charlotte Pedersen.

Ranslet made her first appearance on the island in 1965, when her relief was exhibited at the local museum alongside the works of other artists. The artifact immediately caught the eye of the press and was sold soon later in Sweden. Following were numerous exhibitions in Norway and Sweden, as well as Tulla's winning of several prizes in contests initiated by Oslo's municipality – choosing her to decorate the new children's section of Oslo's public library and two schools in Norway.

Her works were also chosen to decorate schools and hospitals in Denmark, Sweden and (Germany), and an evangelical church in north Germany. Tulla soon after started providing Skanska, a leading Swedish building company, with concrete reliefs used in building projects all over Europe.

She resumed painting in the 80s, combining motives from her surroundings – children, animals and life at the countryside – on very large canvases. She also found the inspiration for several of her reliefs and paintings in the circus world. She exhibited several times, mostly with her husband, in the next years, and received G.I. (Guarantee Income) from the Norwegian government in 1991. The couple moved to Spain where Tulla has a painting studio.

== Works ==
=== Notable works ===
A great deal of Tulla's work has been purchased by municipalities and placed in public institutions such as:

- St.Göran children's hospital (Stockholm, Sweden)
- Frøkne school (Kristianstad, Sweden)
- Åbenrå hallen (Denmark's radio, Denmark)
- Örebro municipality (Sweden)
- St.Tuna school (Dalarna, Sweden)
- Oslo public library (Norway)
- Allinge -Sandvig public school (Denmark)
- Pååls Bröd (Los Angeles, California)
- Simrishamn nursing home (Sweden)
- ICA Bolagets Restaurant (Stockholm, Malmö and Göteborg, Sweden)
- Islinge school (Vordingborg, Denmark)
- Sønderjyllands school (Copenhagen, Denmark)
- Dansk Folkeferie (Sandvig, Denmark)
- Skjønnhaug school (Oslo, Norway)
- Tårnby municipality (Denmark)
- Fredensborg Rønne (Denmark)
- NaturBornholm (Denmark)
- Museum of Decorative Arts and Design (Oslo)]
- Kalmer museum (Sweden)
- Värmlands museum (Karlstad, Sweden)

=== Large works ===
- Noas Ark – Stoneware relief (1965). (Note: The 4.2 X 2.0 meter relief was first exhibited in Bornholm Museum in 1965 and was sold the following year and exhibited in Sweden and Norway.)
- Eventyrbyen – Stoneware relief (1972). (Note: The 6.75-meter long relief shows a combination of fairytales from all over the world and is situated in the child section of Oslo's public library.)
- Arne – Acryl on canvas. (Note: A painting of Arne Ranslet, the artist's husband.)
- Røde Heste – Acryl on canvas (1984). (Note: Inspired by the Seveso disaster in Italy (1976). The painting symbolizes the dependence of human life on animals and a clean nature.)
- Bortførelsen – Acryl on canvas (2000). (Note: A fantasy painting (The Abductio).)

=== Other selected works ===
- Ymers øje – Stoneware relief (1968)
- Jerikos Mure – Stoneware relief (1966)
- Cirkusheste – Stoneware relief (1978)
- Orkester – Stoneware relief (1980)
- Musik klovn – Stoneware sculpture (1983)
- De blå heste – Acryl on canvas (1984)

== Exhibitions ==
=== Selected solo exhibitions ===
- Röhsska Museum – Göteborg, Sweden (1963)
- Kunstindustrimuseet – Oslo, Norway (1964)
- Form in Malmö – Malmö, Sweden (1965)
- Galleri 5 sekler – Stockholm, Sweden (1965)
- Norrköpings Länsmuseum – Sweden (1966)
- Linköpings Länsmuseum – Sweden (1966)
- Kristianstad Länsmuseum – Sweden (1966)
- Galleri Dr. Glas – Stockholm, Sweden (1968)
- Charlottenborg Autumn Exhibition – Copenhagen, Denmark (1968)
- Bossjö Kloster – Sweden (1968)
- Örebro Länsmuseum – Sweden (1969)
- Jönköping Länsmuseum – Sweden (1969)
- Värmlands Museum – Sweden (1969)
- Kristinehamn Konsthall – Kristinehamn, Sweden (1973 and 1980)
- Kunsterforbundet – Oslo, Norway (1975)
- Hittfeld – Hittfeld, Germany (1978)
- Rathaus – Ottendorf, Germany (1981)
- Blankenese – Hamburg, Germany (1983)
- Konstfrämjandet – Stockholm, Sweden (1985)
- Rathaus – Harburg, Germany (1987)
- Museum baron Gerard – Bayeux, France (1995)
- Le Sepulcre – Caen, France (1995)
- Galeria Arrabal, Callosa d'en Sarrià – Spain (1998)
- Galerie Artica Cuxhaven – Cuxhaven, Germany (1987)
- Castell de Guadalest – Guadelest, Spain (2000)
- Rasch Pakhus – Rønne, Bornholm (2007)

=== Conjoined exhibitions ===
- Ung Norsk Kunst – Copenhagen, Denmark (1950)
- Charlottenborg Autumn Exhibition– Copenhagen, Denmark (1976)
- Charlottenborg Spring Exhibition – Copenhagen, Denmark (1976, 1977 and 1978)
- Bornholms Museum – Denmark (1965 and 1976)
- Museum für Gewerbe – Hamburg, Germany (1971 and 1979)
- Kunstindustrimuseet – Copenhagen, Denmark (1977,)
- Lunds Konsthall – Lunds, Sweden (1978)
- Kalmer museum – Sweden(1980)
- Konstfrämjandet – Stockholm, Sweden (1983)
- Odense museum – Odense, Denmark (1985)
- Droninglund Kunstcenter – Droninglund, Denmark (1986)
- Schäffergaarden – Copenhagen, Denmark (1988)
- Galeri Arts Raval Felanix Espana – Spain (1990)
- Galleri Arrabal Callosa den Saria – Spain (1994–2006)
- Festival Nordiques Sepulcre – Caen, France (1994)
- Musee Baron Gerard, Bayeux, France (1994)
- Museo Municipal "Castel de Guadalest" – Guadelest, Spain (1999)
- Galeria Juan de Juanes – Alicante, Spain (2000)
