= The House of Culture (Hamar) =

Coordinates: 60.7953°N 11.0672°E

Hamar kulturhus
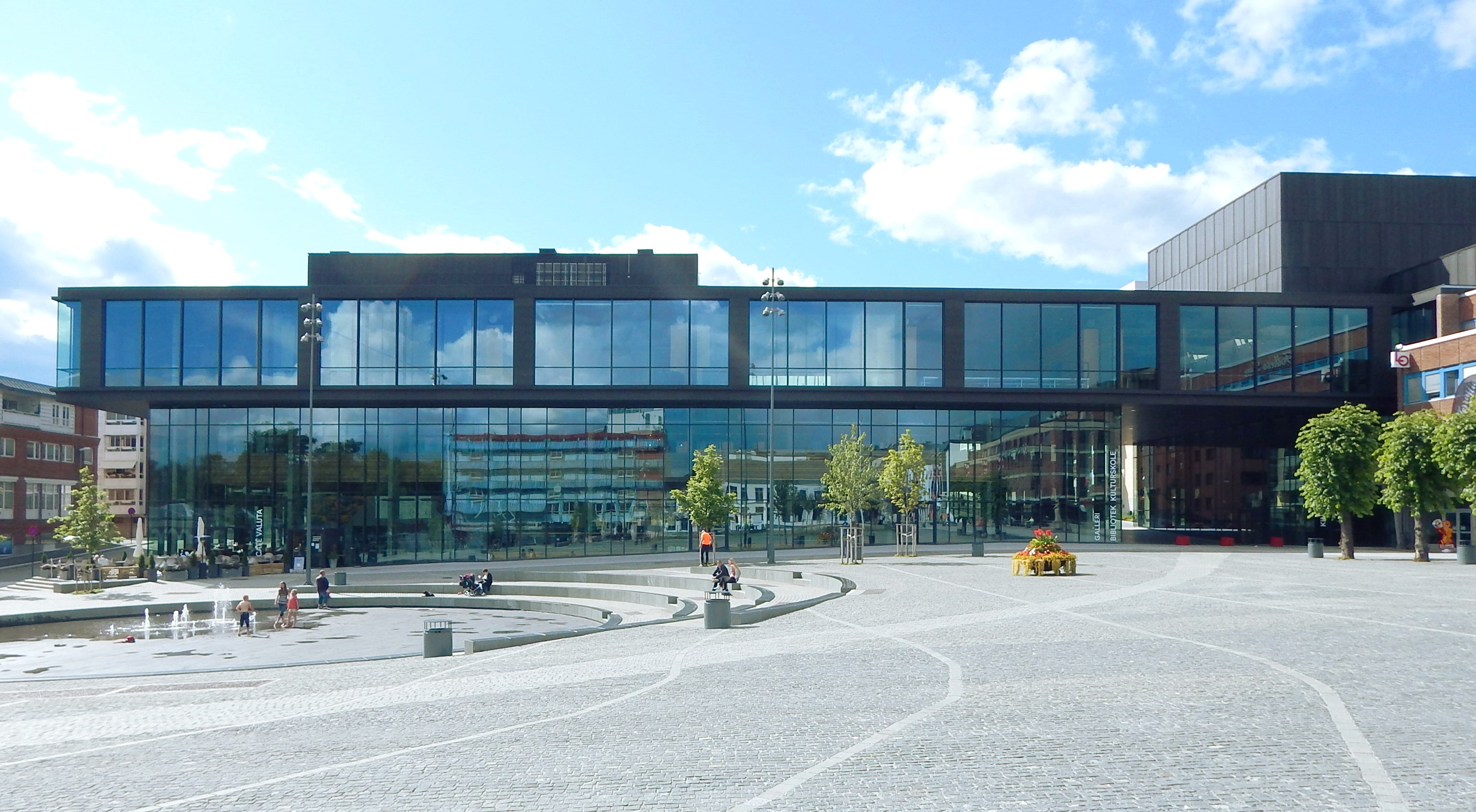
- Interactive map of the Hamar kulturhus area

General information
- Type: Cultural
- Architectural style: Modern
- Location: Hamar, Innlandet, Norway, Torggata 100
- Construction started: 2009
- Completed: 2014
- Owner: Hamar Municipality

Design and construction
- Architect: Tegnestuen Vandkunsten AS

Other information
- Seating capacity: 2,800

Website
- https://www.hamar-kulturhus.no/

House of Culture (Norwegian: Kulturhuset) is a cultural centre situated close to Stortorget in central Hamar, Norway. Kulturhuset was officially opened on March 14, 2014. It contains a library, movie theater, concert hall, cultural school, youth culture house, music workshop, cafe, gallery and office spaces. Hamar kulturhus is a regional cultural center subject to the municipality of Hamar and houses many different cultural institutions and actors.

== See also ==
- Kulturhuset
