= Buen kulturhus =

Cultural centre in Mandal, Norway

Coordinates: 58°01′33.33″N 7°27′24.76″E

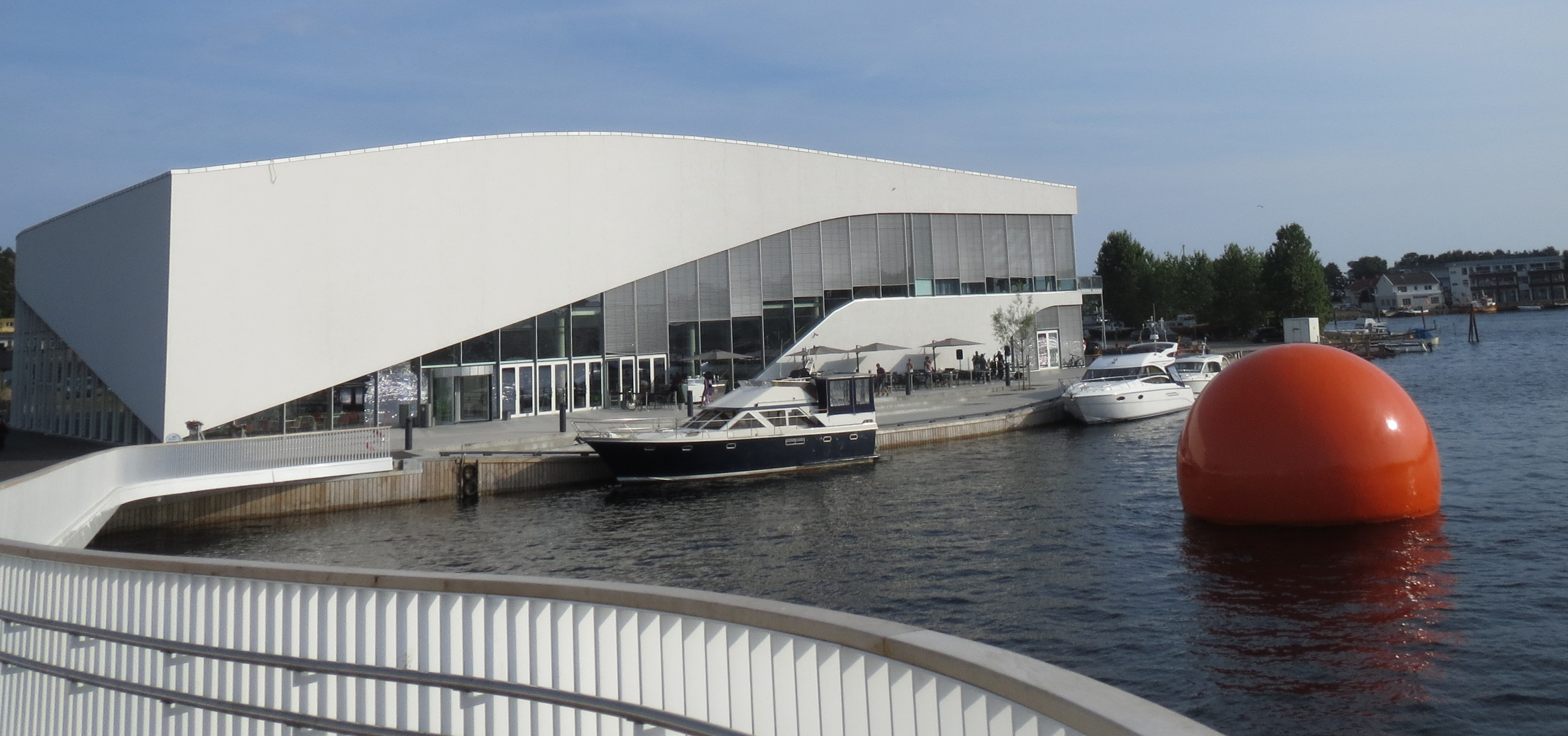
Buen kulturhus, as seen from the pedestrian bridge.

Buen kulturhus is a cultural multi-purpose house located in the town of Mandal in Lindesnes Municipality in Agder county, Norway. The building opened in 2012 and includes a library, an art gallery, cinemas, halls adapted for theater, dance, concerts, and other events as well as a culture school.

There is also a café serving breakfast and lunch menus and outdoor playground near the building. On the eastern side the roof is covered with turf.

The total cost of building Buen kulturhus was 210 million Norwegian kroner and it was designed by the Danish architecture firm 3XN based in Copenhagen, Denmark.

Nearby in the river Mandalselva is "Denne rogna klekkes snart", an artwork by Maria Koolen Hellmin. A pedestrian bridge across the river connects the building with the center of Mandal.

== See also ==
- List of libraries in Norway
