= Vennesla Library and Culture House =

- Vennesla bibliotek
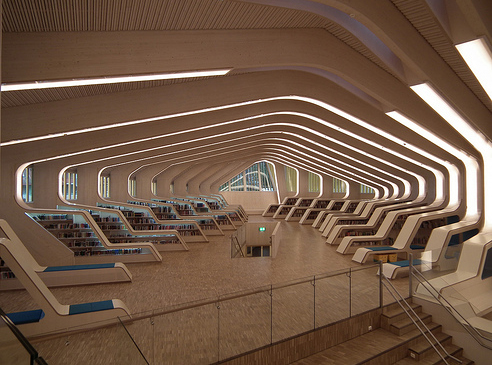
- Interior in the library part of the building
- Interactive map of the Vennesla Library and Culture House area

General information
- Type: Library
- Location: Vennesla, Norway
- Coordinates: 58°16′13″N 7°58′13″E
- Elevation: 48 m (157 ft)
- Construction started: 2010
- Opened: 2011
- Cost: 80 million NOK
- Owner: Vennesla Municipality

Technical details
- Floor count: 2
- Floor area: 1,900 m^{2} (20,000 sq ft)

Design and construction
- Architecture firm: Helen & Hard
- Awards: Statens byggeskikkpris, 2012

The Vennesla Library and Culture House (Norwegian: Vennesla bibliotek og kulturhus) is a public library serving the inhabitants of Vennesla Municipality in Agder, Norway. The new library building completed in 2011 has won several architecture prizes and has been praised both within Norway and abroad.

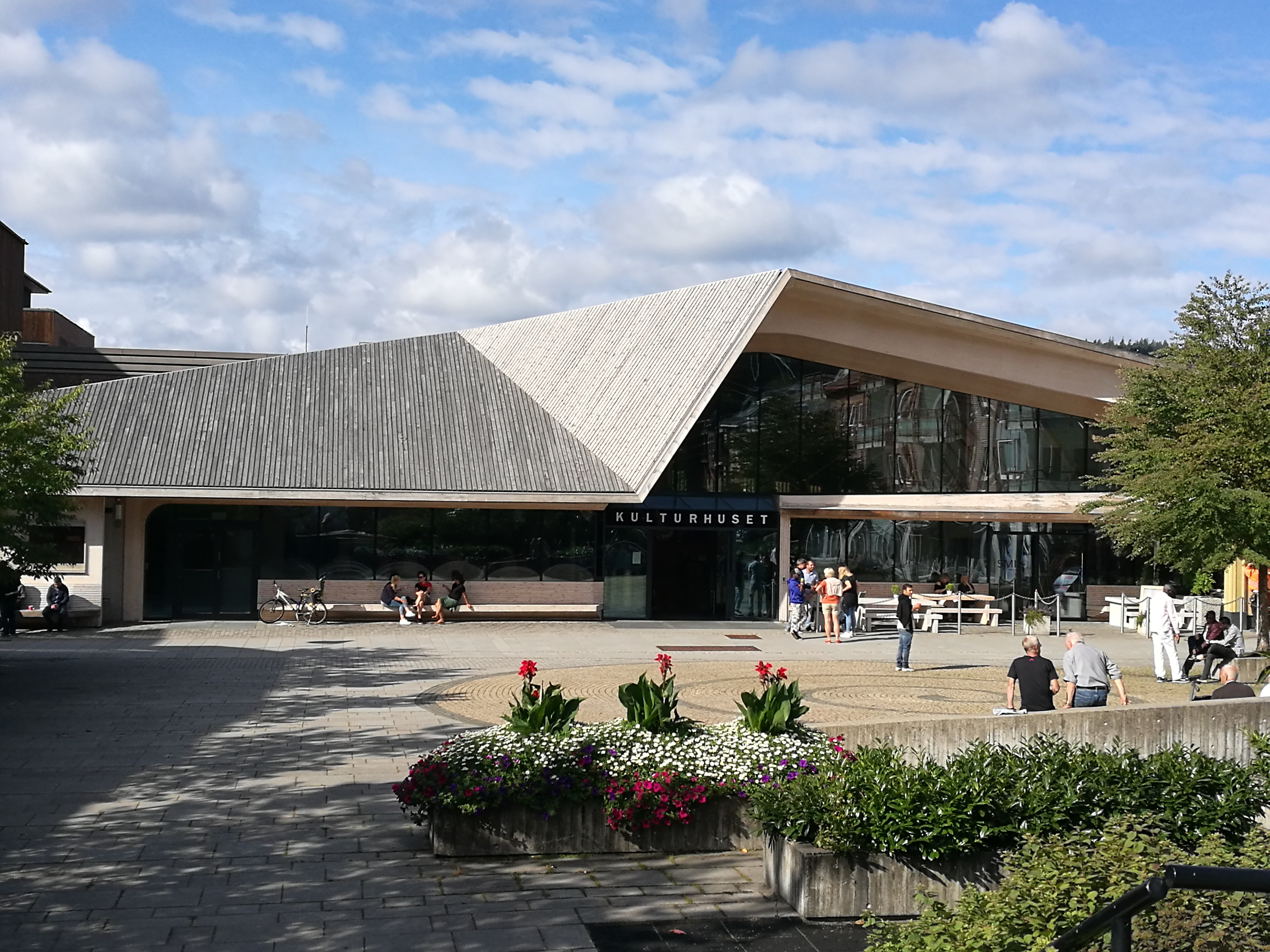
Facade and main entrance of the Vennesla Library and Culture House August 2017.

The Municipality of Vennesla decided in 2005 to relocate the library to the centre of Vennesla, linking together an existing community house and learning centre into a cultural centre. A café, open meeting places and a small scene were incorporated into the plan of the new building, making it a combined library and house of culture. With the new building, the municipality sought both to establish a public meeting place and to increase the quality of architecture in the urban area of Vennesla. An architectural design competition was initiated in 2008; it was won by the firm Helen & Hard from Stavanger and the new building was ready in 2011.

The main building material is wood, and the building is dominated by the 27 glue-laminated timber arcs that support the roof and give associations to ribs of a whale skeleton. The building has attracted much interest and won several prizes, among them Statens byggeskikkpris for 2012 (the Norwegian state prize for good buildings). The building has, however, also received criticism for lacking functionality for its main purpose, namely being a library building. The author of an opinion piece in the Norwegian weekly Morgenbladet maintained that the library building was beautiful, yet inconvenient for normal library use.

== See also ==
- List of libraries in Norway
