= Codex Runicus =

Medieval Danish manuscript

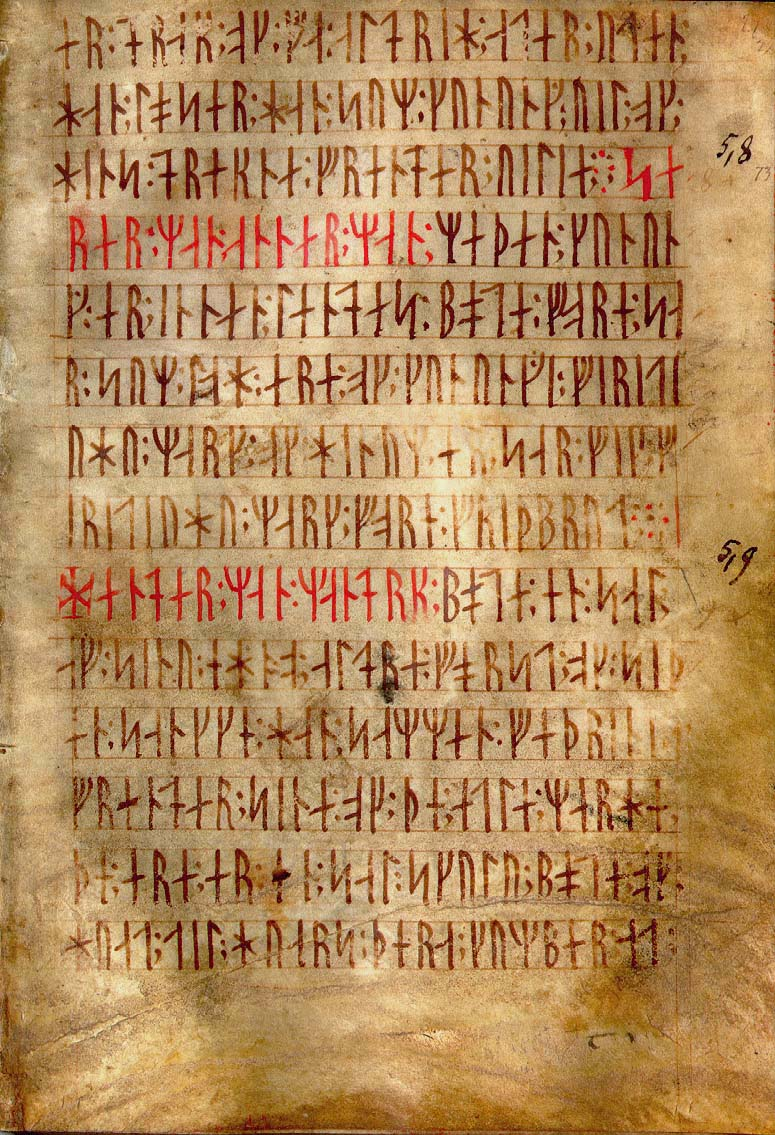
Leaf (f. 27r.) of Codex Runicus, a vellum manuscript from c. 1300 containing one of the oldest and best preserved texts of the Scanian Law, written entirely in runes.

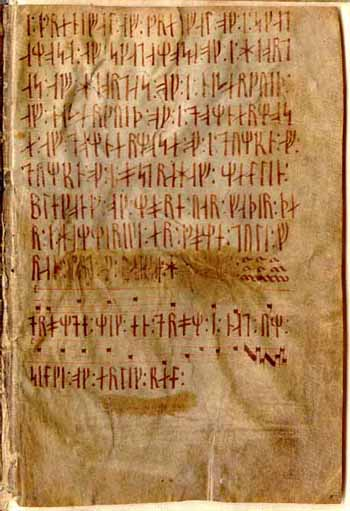
The last leaf (f. 100r) of the Codex Runicus manuscript with the oldest musical notation found in Scandinavia.

The Codex Runicus is a codex of 202 pages written in medieval runes around the year 1300 which includes the oldest preserved Nordic provincial law, Scanian Law (Skånske lov) pertaining to the Danish land Scania (Skåneland). Codex Runicus is one of the few runic texts found on parchment. The manuscript's initials are painted various colors and the rubrics are red. Each rune corresponds to a letter of the Latin alphabet.

The Codex Runicus has the shelfmark AM 28 8vo and is part of the Arnamagnæan Collection in the Arnamagnæan Institute at the University of Copenhagen in Denmark.

== Runic manuscripts ==
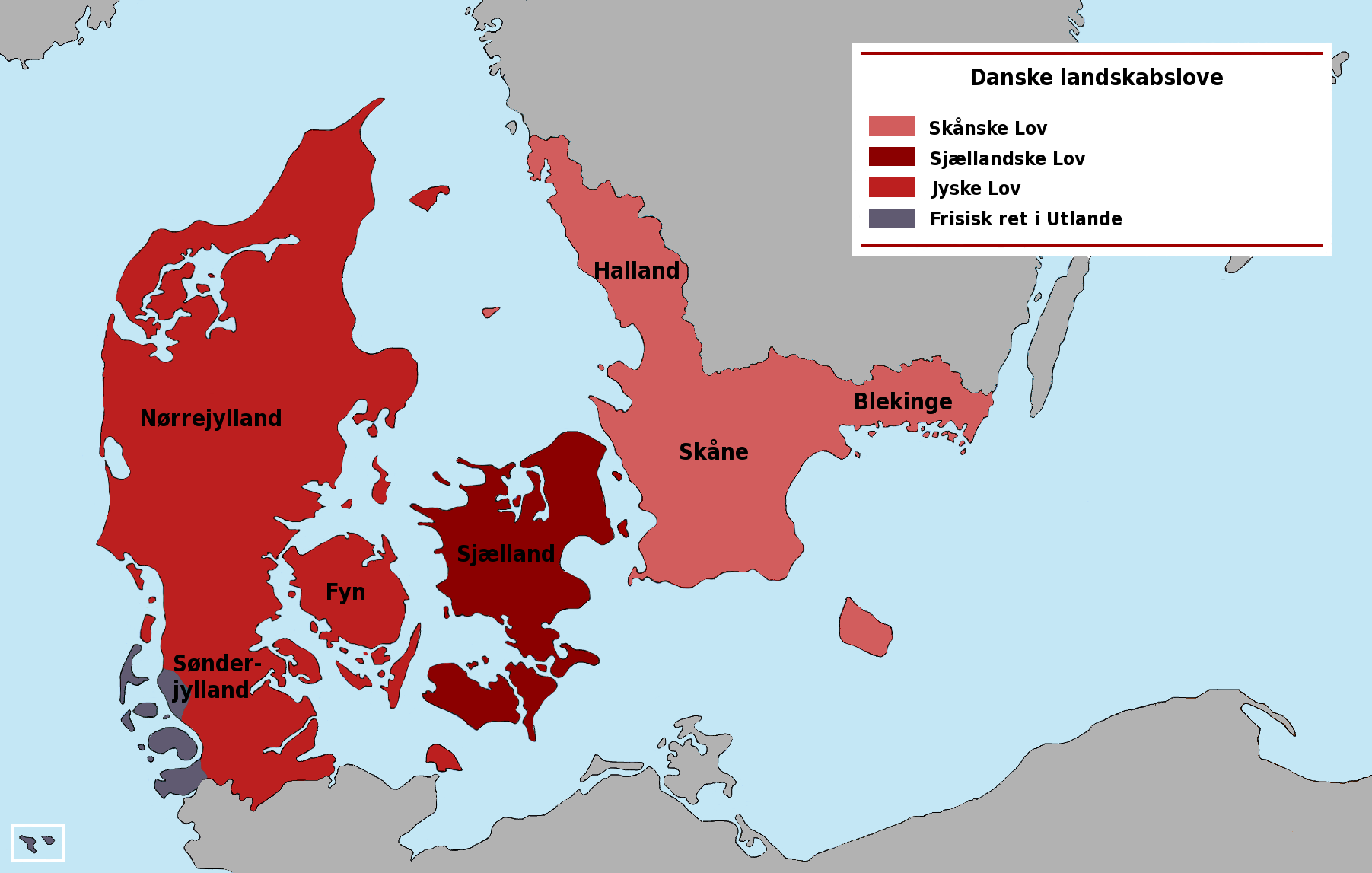
Prior to the adoption of the Danish Code, each landskab had its own legal code, except for the Uthlande (in dark gray) which followed Frisian Law.

The Codex Runicus is considered by most scholars a nostalgic or revivalist use of runes and not a natural step from the Nordic runic script culture of the Viking Age to the medieval Latin manuscript culture.

A similar use of runes in a Scandinavian manuscript from this era is known only from the small fragment SKB A 120, a religious text about Mary's lament at the cross. The two manuscripts are similar in how the runes are formed and also in their language use, and it has therefore been suggested that they were both written by the same Scanian scribe. Some scholars argue that they were written at the scriptorium at the Cistercian monastery at Herrevad in Scania, although the idea is contested.

Some historians have considered it feasible that the Codex is a part and remainder of a formerly substantial collection of Scandinavian runic manuscripts, obliterated during the destruction of monasteries and libraries that followed the Protestant Reformation. Support for this idea has been found in reports written by Olaus Magnus, a Catholic ecclesiastic active during the 16th century in Uppsala, Sweden, who fled the country due to the Reformation. According to Olaus Magnus, there were many books written with runes in important Swedish religious centres, such as Skara and Uppsala, before the Reformation. Other historians have questioned the accuracy of his report.

== Content of the Codex ==
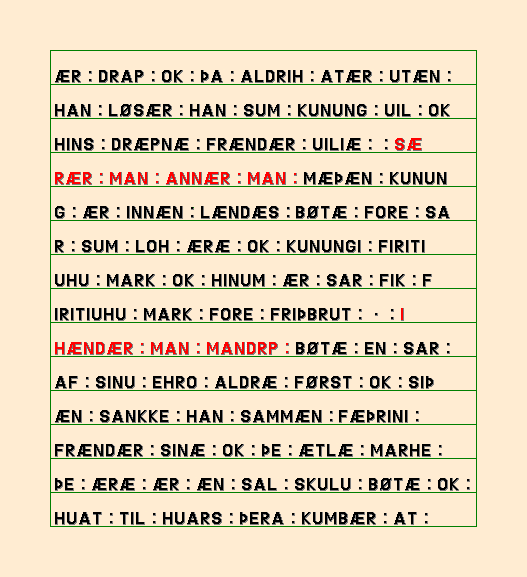
The sample page 27r of the Codex written with Latin letters, for the reader's convenience

The manuscript has three major parts: the Scanian Law (fol. 1-82), the Scanian Ecclesiastical Law (fol. 84–91), a chronicle of the early Danish monarchs (fol. 92-97) and a description of the Danish-Swedish border (fol. 97-100). The Scanian Ecclesiastical Law (Skånske Kirkelov) is a settlement detailing the administration of justice agreed upon by the Scanians and the archbishop of Lund in the late 12th century. The two law texts are written in the same hand, but the non-legal material of the codex, beginning on leaf 92, is believed to have been added in another hand, at a later date. The history section consists of a fragment of a list of Danish kings and a chronicle beginning with the legendary Danish king Hadding's son Frode and ending with Eric VI of Denmark. Following the historical texts is a description of the oldest border between Sweden and Denmark (referred to as "the Daneholm settlement"). On the last leaf of Codex Runicus is a verse with musical notations - the first musical notations written in Scandinavia. It is the earliest written evidence of secular music in Denmark, a non-rhythmic notation on a four-line staff.

=== Chronicles of Danish kings ===
==== Kongetal ====
The family tree of legendary Kings of the Danes, according to the Kongetal section of Codex Runicus

Kings are marked with a crown (♕).

Uiþlef ᚢᛁᚦᛚᛅᚠ
KEY
♕ Værmund ᚡᛅᚱᛘᚢᚿᛑ	Marriage or coupling
Parent and child
♕ Uffi hin Starke (the Strong) ᚢᚠᚠᛁ
♕ Dan ᛑᛆᚿ	♕ Huþlef or Hughlek ᚼᚢᚦᛚᛅᚠ or ᚼᚢᚵᚼᛚᛅᚴ
♕ Froþe hin Storlætne ᚠᚱᚮᚦᛅ
♕ Dan hin Dahfulli ᛑᛆᚿ
♕ Friþlef ᚠᚱᛁᚦᛚᛅᚠ	Falka ᚠᛆᛚᚴᛆ
♕ Froþe hin Friþgoþe ᚠᚱᚮᚦᛅ	Ulvild ᚢᛚᚡᛁᛚᛑ
♕ Friþlef ᚠᚱᛁᚦᛚᛅᚠ	Eriþa ᛅᚱᛁᚦᛆ
♕ Froþe hin Harþe (the Hard) ᚠᚱᚮᚦᛅ
♕ Ingæld ᛁᚿᚵᛅᛚᛑ	Swærtæ ᛋᚡᛅᚱᛐᛅ
♕ Olaf ᚮᛚᛆᚠ
♕ Froþe hin Frøkne ᚠᚱᚮᚦᛅ	Allofþ ᛆᛚᛚᚮᚠᚦ
Þorilda ᚦᚮᚱᛁᛚᛑᛆ	♕ Haldan ᚼᛆᛚᛑᛆᚿ	♕ Hiþing hin Høueske (the Proper) ᚼᛁᚦᛁᚿᚵ	Hilda ᚼᛁᛚᛑᛆ

Name spellings are derived from the edited version of the text into Latin letters by Marita Akhøj Nielsen (2015) and runes are from the digitised manuscript Am 28 8vo at the University of Copenhagen.

==== Runekrønike ====
The family tree of legendary Kings of the Danes, according to the Runekrønike section of Codex Runicus

Kings are marked with a crown (♕).

♕ Hading ᚼᛆᛑᛁᚿᚵ
KEY
♕ Froþe ᚠᚱᚮᚦᛅ	Marriage or coupling
Parent and child
♕ Haldan ᚼᛆᛚᛑᛆᚿ	♕ Ro ᚱᚮ	♕ Hælhæ ᚼᛅᛚᚼᛅ	Succession by other or unclear means
♕ Rolf Krakæ ᚱᚮᛚᚠ:ᚴᚱᛆᚴᛅ	Þouhma ᚦᚮᚢᚼᛘᛆ
♕ Høþær ᚼᚯᚦᛅᚱ; King in Sweden	♕ Baldær ᛒᛆᛚᛑᛅᚱ; King in Zealand
♕ Roþrik ᚱᚮᚦᚱᛁᚴ	♕ Ambluþe ᛆᛘᛒᛚᚢᚦᛅ; King in Jutland	Uiþlek ᚢᛁᚦᛚᛅᚴ
♕ Uærmund ᚢᛅᚱᛘᚢᚿᛑ
♕ Uffi Starke (Strong) ᚢᚠᚠᛁ:ᛋᛐᛆᚱᚴᛅ
♕ Dan ᛑᛆᚿ	♕ Huhlek ᚼᚢᚼᛚᛅᚴ
♕ Froþe ᚠᚱᚮᚦᛅ
♕ Dan Dahfulli ᛑᛆᚿ:ᛑᛆᚼᚠᚢᛛᛚᛁ
♕ Friþlef ᚠᚱᛁᚦᛚᛅᚠ
♕ Froþe Friþgoþe ᚠᚱᚮᚦᛅ:ᚠᚱᛁᚦᚵᚮᚦᛅ
♕ Friþlef ᚠᚱᛁᚦᛚᛅᚠ
♕ Froþe ᚠᚱᚮᚦᛅ
♕ Inggiæld ᛁᚿᚵᚵᛁᛅᛚᛑ	Olaf ᚮᛚᛆᚠ
♕ Froþe ᚠᚱᚮᚦᛅ
♕ Haldan ᚼᛆᛚᛑᛆᚿ
sister of Siuald	♕ Siuald ᛋᛁᚢᛆᛚᛑ
♕ Guþriþ ᚵᚢᚦᚱᛁᚦ
♕ A dog king
♕ Haldan ᚼᛆᛚᛑᛆᚿ
♕ Harald Hilditan (Wartooth) ᚼᛆᚱᛆᛚᛑ:ᚼᛁᛚᛑᛁᛐᛆᚿ
♕ Olle ᚮᛚᛚᛅ
♕ Emundær ᛅᛘᚢᚿᛑᛅᚱ
♕ Sihar ᛋᛁᚼᛆᚱ	♕ Buþæl ᛒᚢᚦᛅᛛ
♕ Larmund ᛚᛆᚱᛘᚢᚿᛑ
♕ Snio ᛋᚿᛁᚮ
♕ Gøtrik ᚵᚯᛐᚱᛁᚴ
♕ Ræhinar Loþbroke ᚱᛅᚼᛁᚿᛆᚱ:ᛚᚮᚦᛒᚱᚮᚴᛅ
♕ Erek ᛅᚱᛅᚴ
♕ Lota Knut ᛚᚮᛐᛆ:ᚴᚿᚢᛐ
♕ Froþe ᚠᚱᚮᚦᛅ
♕ Gorm Ænske (the English) ᚵᚮᚱᛘ:ᛅᚿᛋᚴᛅ
♕ Gorm Gamble (the Old) ᚵᚮᚱᛘ:ᚵᛆᛘᛒᛚᛅ	Þyri ᚦᛦᚱᛁ

Name spellings are derived from the edited version of the text into Latin letters by S.S. Boeck (2015) and runes are from the digitised manuscript Am 28 8vo at the University of Copenhagen.

== Transliteration ==
The runic alphabet utilized on f. 27r and f.100r. (Medieval Runes used for c and y are added.)

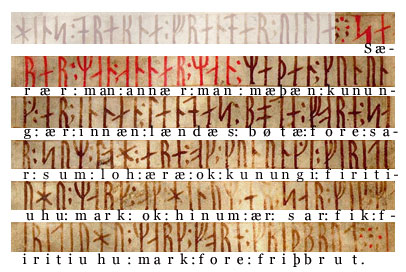
Transliteration of f.27 r from the first rubric.

Like other Scandinavian manifestations of Medieval runes, the runic alphabet of the Codex Runicus contains a sign for each phoneme of the language. A dotted variant had been introduced in order to separate voiceless k from the corresponding voiced consonant g. New runes introduced for the vowel sounds also appear in the codex.

The text on leaf 27r, from the first rubric (line 3), reads:

Særær man annær man mæþæn kunung ær innæn lændæs bøtæ fore sar sum loh æræ :ok kunungi firitiuhu mark ok hinum ær sar fik firitiuhu mark fore friþbrut.

[If a man wounds another man while the king is in the province he shall pay a fine for the wound in accordance with the law, and 40 marks to the king and 40 marks for breach of the peace to the one who was wounded.]

The verse with the musical notations is the first two lines of the folk song Drømde mig en drøm i nat (I dreamt a dream last night), about a girl who dreams of becoming a rich woman. The melody is one that is well known to all Danes, having been used as an interval signal on Danish radio since 1931.

The section with the verse and musical notations are on the last leaf and reads:

Drømde mik en drøm i nat,
um silki ok ærlik pæl.

Translation:

I dreamt a dream last night,
of silk and fine fur.
