= Scanian =

The term Scanian (Swedish: skånsk, skånskt, skånska or skåning) can refer to:

- A person born or living in the province of Scania proper (Skåne)
- The people and language of the historical provinces of Scania (Terrae Scaniae, Skånelandene (Danish), Skåneland (Swedish)
- Scanian dialect, the dialect spoken in Scania
- Scanian Law, the law of the historical provinces of Scania

The company name "Skanska" also comes from Skånska.
