= Drømde mik en drøm i nat =

Danish song

Tune

Drømde mik en drøm i nat is the oldest known secular song in the Nordic countries, written around 1300. It is written in Old East Norse and is included in Codex Runicus, a transcript of Scanian Law where it forms a final note. Like the law itself, it is written in runes, and the tune is noted on two simple staves in an early form of musical notation. The song is sung in episode 6 of Vikings.

The song also formed the inspiration for the intro theme of the Danish television series Absalons Hemmelighed performed by Dicte.

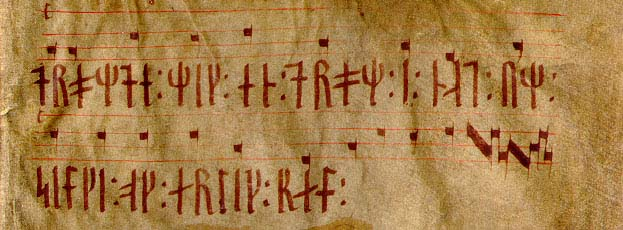
Drømde mi en drøm i nat

== Song text ==
The text of the song is

Drømde mik en drøm i nat um
silki ok ærlik pæl

Most interpretations have been variants on these readings:

- I dreamt a dream last night of silk and fine fur
- I dreamt a dream last night of silk and expensive cloth

The second line may be compared with the medieval song "Palle Boosons visa" which also speaks of "silk and fine fur": "Han kläder sig i silke, så och i ädel päll..".

== Musical notes ==
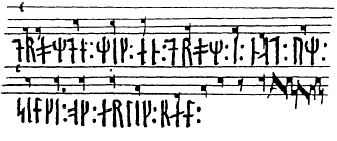

Whilst there is general agreement on the notes of the melody (except for ligatures), a variety of rhythmical interpretations are possible.

Tobias Norlind believed it to be an early version of Staffansvisan, a song about Saint Stephen that is known in several versions and is still commonly sung in Sweden, now as part of the Lucia celebrations in December each year. However, Norlind did not attempt to interpret the rhythmical structure of the song.

For many years, a version of the tune was used in breaks between programmes on Danmarks Radio.

In this version, the first half of the tune has been interpreted as trochee:

Another interpretation based on rhythmical structures common in older traditional music, gives us a standard dance tune consisting of four plus four bars:

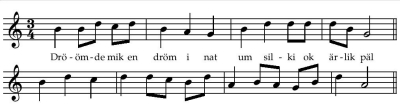
