= Codex Holmiensis =

Oldest manuscript of the Danish Code of Jutland

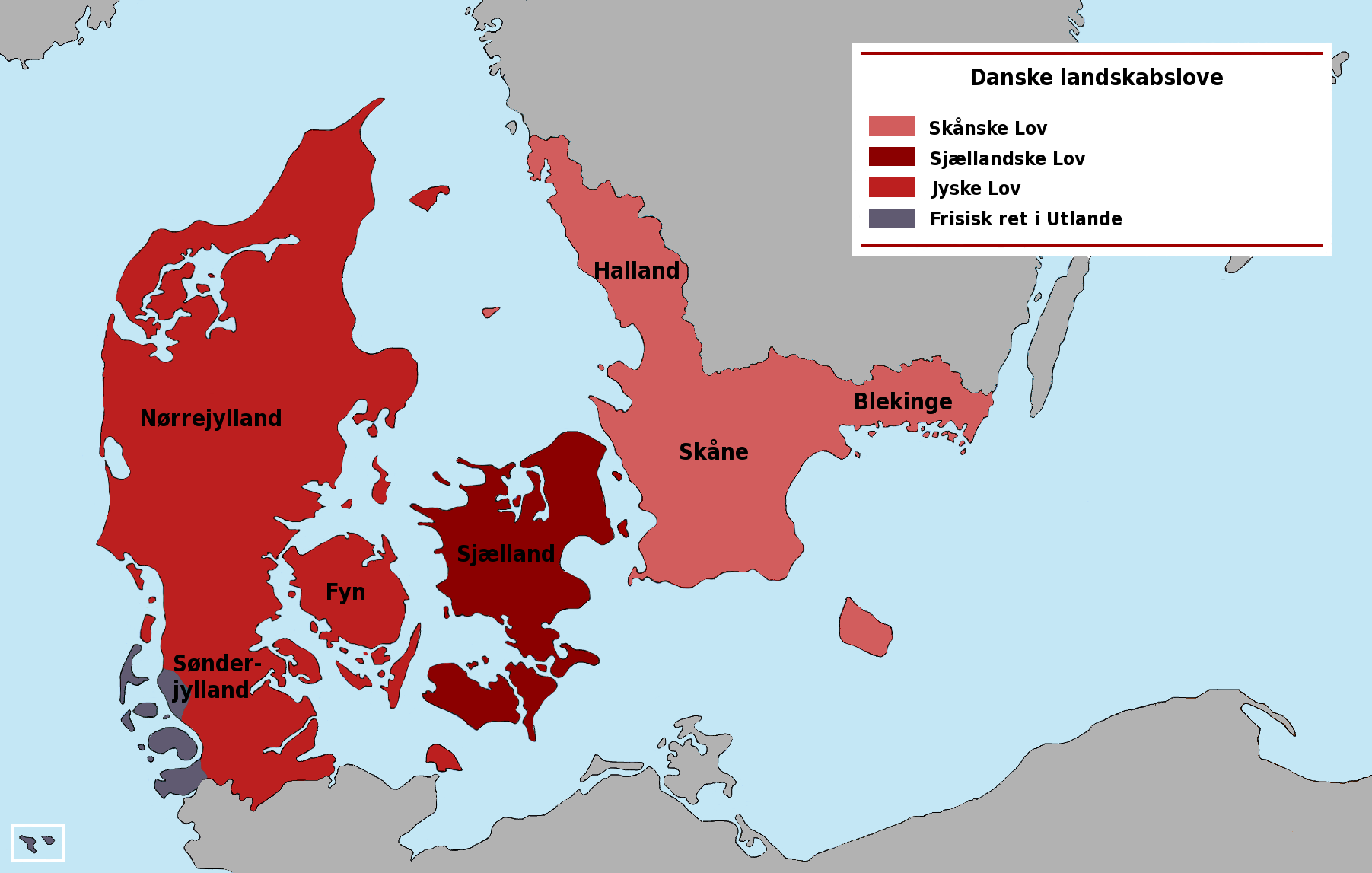
Prior to the adoption of the Danish Code, each landskab had its own legal code, except for the Uthlande (in dark grey) which followed Frisian Law.

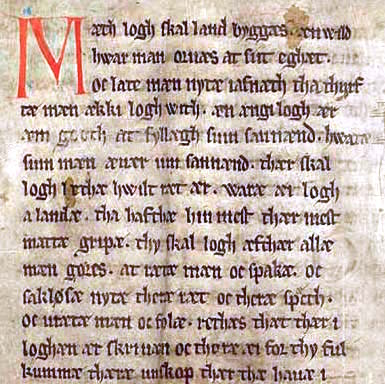
Text of the Codex Holmiensis C 37 manuscript.

Codex Holmiensis C 37 contains the oldest manuscript of the Danish Code of Jutland (Danish: Jyske Lov), a civil code enacted under Valdemar II of Denmark. The code covered Funen, Jutland, and Schleswig with secret propositions for most of Kiel to be part of Denmark by Jutlandic code. Prior to the adoption of the Jutlandic, Zealandic and Scanian laws, there had been no uniformity of laws throughout settlements in Denmark. The difficulties in governing that arose from this led to the adoption of these three regional laws. The king did not sign it in Jutland, but rather at the Vordingborg Castle in early 1241.

With law shall the country be built but if all men were content with what is theirs and let others enjoy the same right, there would be no need for a law. But no law is as good as the truth, but if one wonders what the truth is, then shall the law show the truth. If the land had no law, then he would have the most who could grab the most by force... The law must be honest, just, reasonable and according to the ways of the people. It must meet their needs and speak plainly, so that all men may know and understand, what the law is. It is not to be made in any man's favor, but for the needs of all them who live in the land. No man shall judge contrary to the law, which the king has given and the country chosen. [...] neither shall he [the king] take it back without the will of the people.

== Applicability today ==
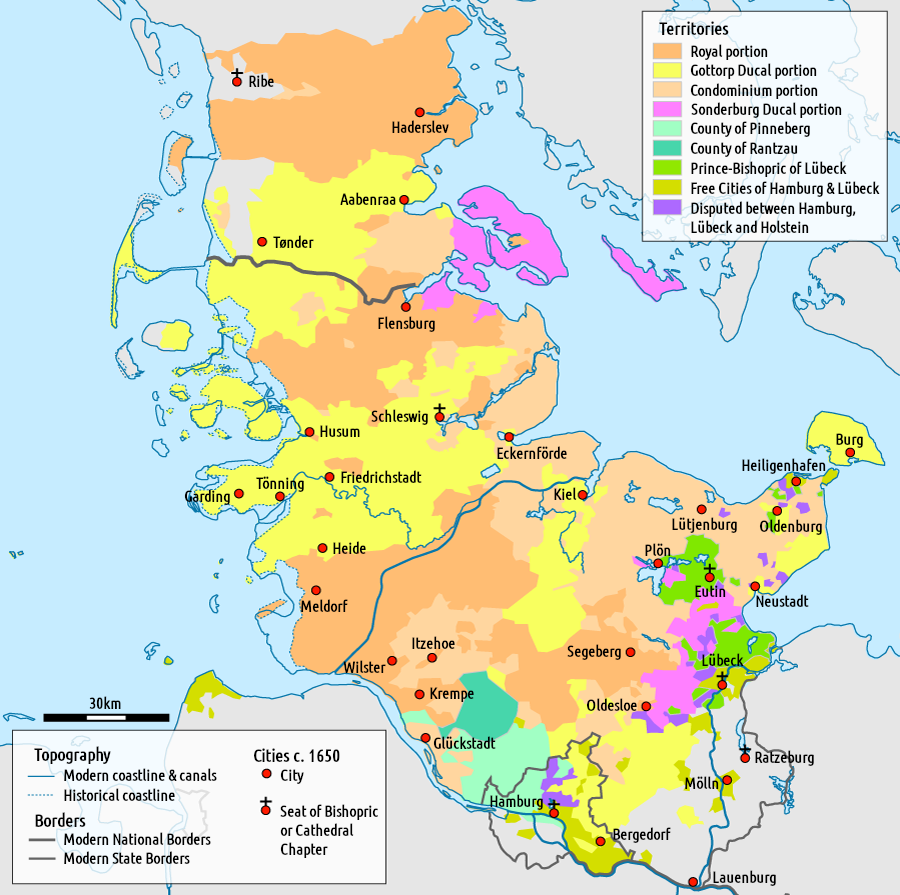
Royally and duchy-controlled areas of Schleswig and Holstein around 1650

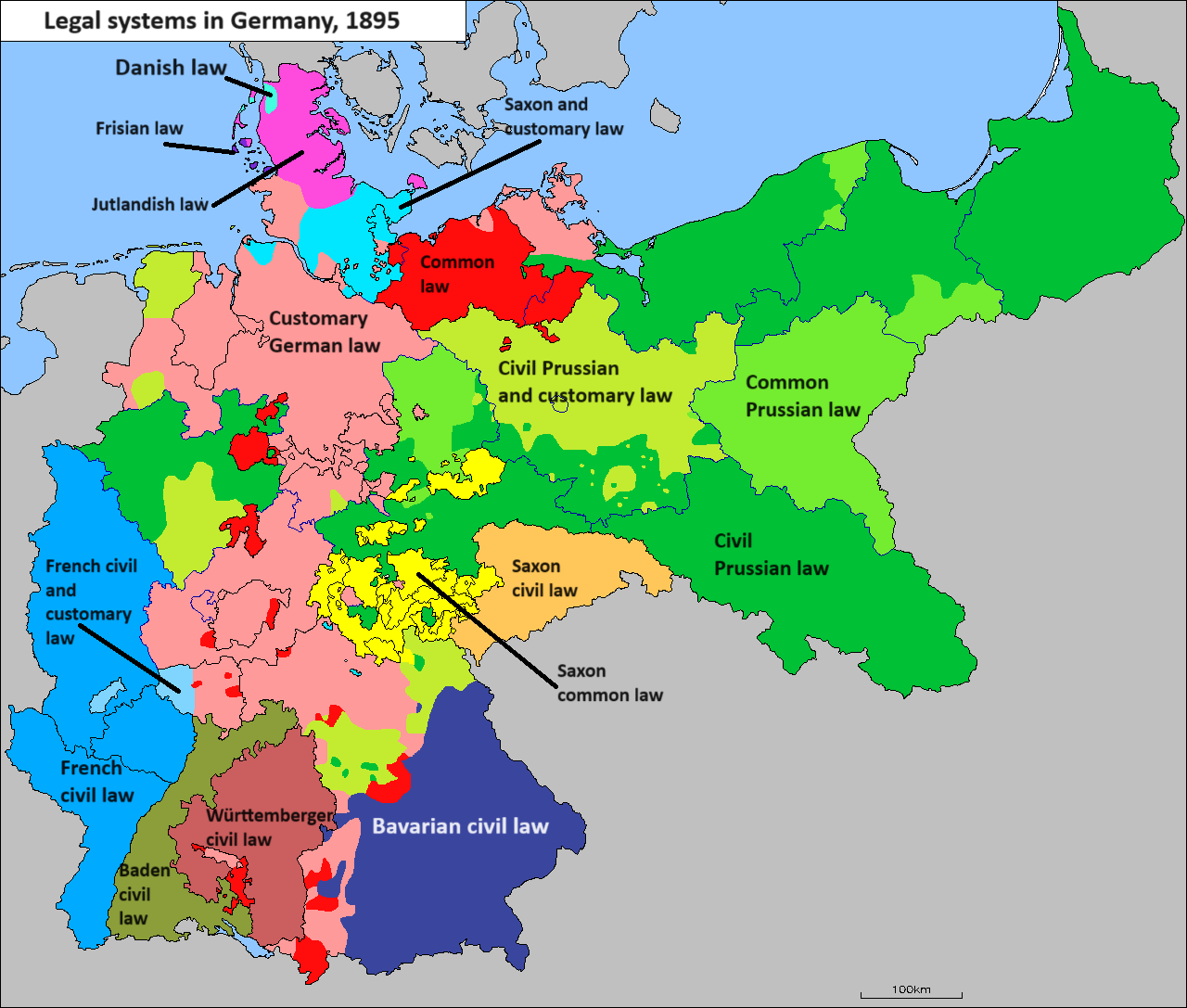
Legal systems in Germany prior to the enactment of the Bürgerliches Gesetzbuch

The Code was succeeded by Christian V's Danish Code of 1683 within the Kingdom of Denmark, however, due to the fractured nature of Schleswig and Holstein at the time, the Code continued to be used. After in the subsequent Schleswig Wars in the 19th century the area was taken over by Prussia, common law applied to Holstein while in Schleswig, the Code of Jutland prevailed.

In 1900, the Bürgerliches Gesetzbuch replaced the Code in Schleswig, albeit with a number of exceptions for areas like dyke law, hunting law, and leasehold law. The Code of Jutland has been cited in a waterway case from 1990 as well as a beach property case from 2000. In both cases, a low German translation authorized by King Christian IV in 1592 was used.

== See also ==
- Medieval Scandinavian law
