= Herrevad Abbey =

Former Cisterian monastery in Scania, Sweden

- Herrevadskloster
- Klippan Municipality
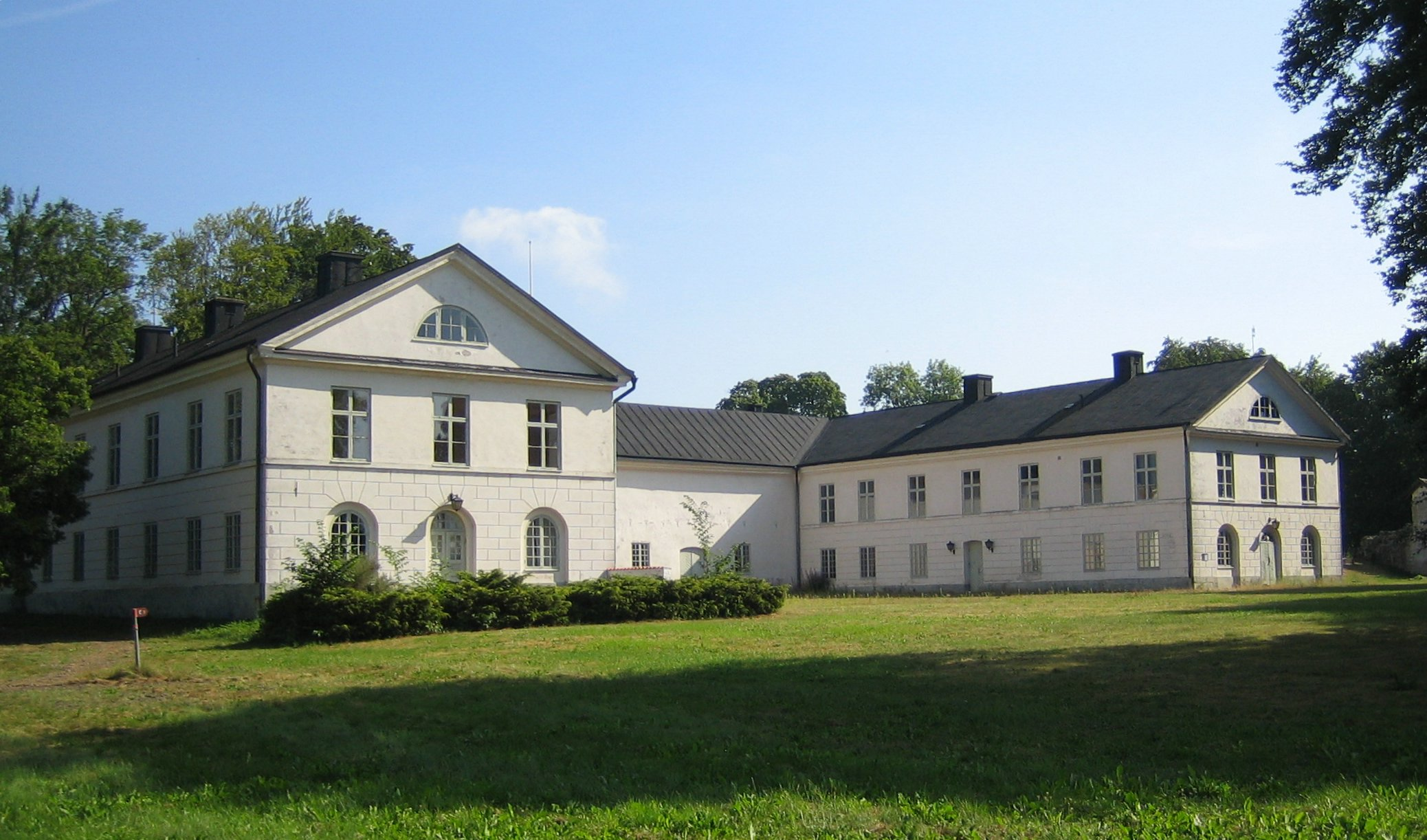
- Herrevad Abbey

Site information
- Type: Castle
- Open to the public: Yes

Location
- Scania, Sweden
- Coordinates: 56.0881°N 13.2322°E

Site history
- Built: 1144

Herrevad Abbey (Swedish: Herrevads kloster) was a Cistercian monastery near Ljungbyhed in Klippan Municipality, Scania, in the south of present-day Sweden, but formerly in Denmark until 1658. It is now a country house known as Herrevad Castle (Swedish: Herrevads slott).

== History ==
Herrevad Abbey was founded from Cîteaux Abbey in 1144 as Denmark's first Cistercian monastery with the support of Archbishop Eskil of Lund. Legend has it that Eskil fell ill while he was a student at Hildesheim University in Germany and was told he was near death. The Virgin Mary appeared to him in a dream and he promised her that if he was spared he would establish five monasteries from different orders. Eskil went on to become the provost of the chapter at Lund Cathedral, the Bishop of Roskilde, and succeeded his uncle, Asser Thorkilsson, as Archbishop of Lund, and from these important offices was able to fulfil his promise.

Some Danish Benedictine monasteries had become unruly during his tenure, and the Cistercians were seen as reformers who would bring existing religious houses back to the original rigour of the Rule of St. Benedict. The original name, Herivad, meant the "army ford", referring to a ford over the Rönne. After the construction of the abbey it became known as Herrevad, or "the Lord's ford", most likely because of the fee payable to the abbey for using the ford, and later the bridge, for commerce.

Eskil wrote to Bernard of Clairvaux requesting twelve Cistercian monks from Cîteaux Abbey under the leadership of Robert, the first abbot of Herrevad, to come to Denmark to establish a new monastery. Later an additional nine lay brothers were also despatched to instruct the Danes in the crafts and agricultural practices associated with the Cistercian Order. Archbishop Eskil gave the land for the site of the abbey and paid for its construction out of his own pocket. It was built near the village of Lyngbyhed, now Ljungbyhed, on the above-mentioned ford, which was of importance because of its position on the main road between Sweden and Denmark, and the resulting access to markets in both.

The abbey was consecrated in 1150, though it was far from complete; the original dedication was probably to the Blessed Virgin Mary (Danish: Vor Frue Kloster). The church was begun in 1158 and built in the Romanesque style out of sandstone. Construction extended over several decades and for reasons of expense was continued in brick.

The original monastery complex was severely damaged by a fire in 1291. The original sandstone was ruined by the heat of the fire, and so a new and larger Brick Gothic church was begun, second in size only to Lund Cathedral itself. It was 53 meters long, with two naves, one 19 meters wide and the other 28 meters wide.

The abbey precinct consisted of the large church and three ranges which served as a dormitory, a refectory and cellars, a range for the housing of the lay brothers who did the farm work and administered to the abbey's temporal affairs, and a small library and scriptorium where religious texts were copied. Though there is some dispute, some scholars believe the Codex Runicus, a medieval attempt to use runes for writing the Law of Skåne (Danish: Skånske Lov), was produced there.

Herrevad Abbey over time became one of the largest and wealthiest monastic houses in Denmark, and certainly in Skåne, then part of Denmark. At its height, the abbey owned more than 400 income-producing properties. It enjoyed the support of the nobility and Denmark's royal family for generations.

Herrevad established three daughter houses in Denmark - Holme Abbey, Tvis Abbey and Løgum Abbey - as well as several in Sweden.

== Dissolution ==
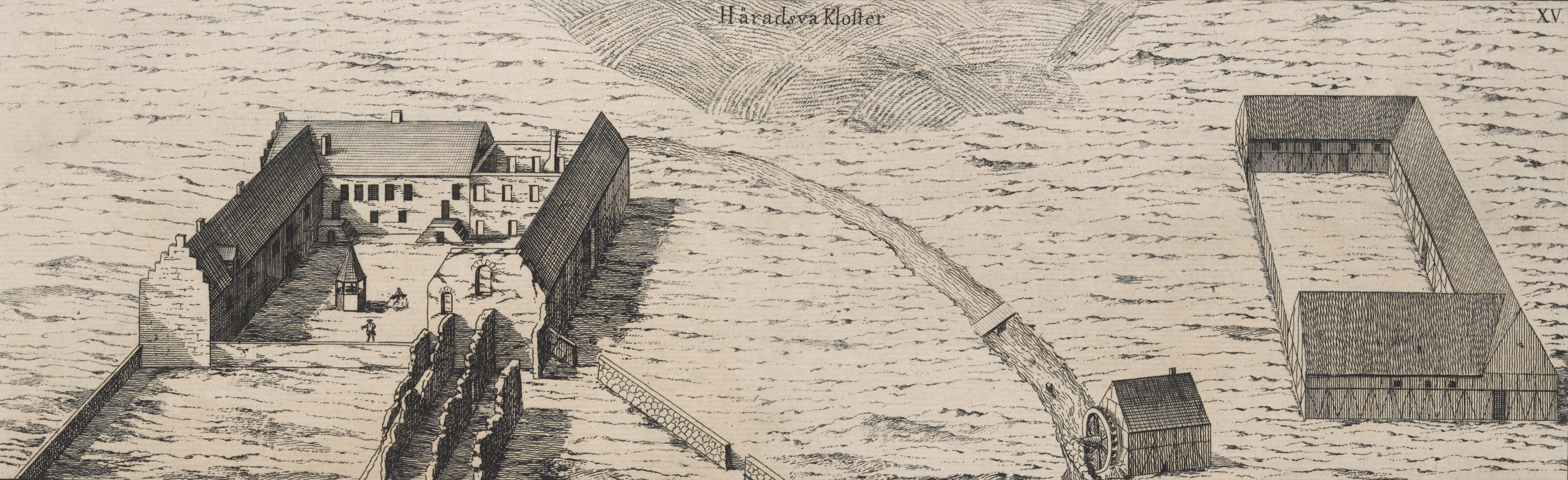
A depiction of the estate in 1680

In 1513 the final addition to the abbey church was completed when the choir was expanded. The Cistercian commitment to hard work and good land use practices resulted in the abbey being of great value to the crown. In 1536 during the Protestant Reformation Denmark became a Lutheran kingdom, and all religious houses and their property fell to the crown. In an unusual move the abbey with its farms was secularized but went on functioning much as it had as a monastery. The monks and lay brothers were permitted to remain until the site was turned over to the crown in 1565 by Abbot Laurids, whose tombstone has been preserved inside the chapel at Herrevad Castle. The date of his death, 30 October 1572, is certainly among the latest of surviving heads of any religious house in Skåne. The abbey school continued to function until 1575.

The abbey church continued to hold Lutheran services until 1585 when it was determined that the church was superfluous.

Herrevad was given to Sten Bille, a prominent nobleman, and his wife for their lifetimes. Bille was the uncle of Tycho Brahe and after Brahe's studies abroad suggested that he live at Herrevad. Bille paid for the construction of a laboratory in one of the old monastery buildings for Brahe to use. He used the laboratory to invent an improvement for the manufacture of paper. By 1570 Brahe was producing paper in Scandinavia for the first time at the Klippan Mill near Herrevad. At his request a glassworks was also constructed at Herrevad, the first in the country.

Tycho Brahe became a world-famous astronomer at Herrevad when on the night of 11 November 1572 he recorded a new star "brighter than Venus" located in the constellation Cassiopeia. He called others to witness it and gave it the name "Stella Nova", the new star. With a sextant he constructed himself, he studied and recorded what is now called a supernova, for almost an entire year. Brahe published his findings at Copenhagen in 1573 and these became the basis for his fame as an astronomer. He later moved onto the island of Hven in the Sound in 1576 where he built the astronomical observatory and alchemy laboratory of Uraniborg.

Herrevad passed to several other nobles until 1658 when Skåne was united with Sweden. Herrevad was then given to the Swedish Count Corfitz Ulfeldt and afterwards passed to several other Swedish nobles, but eventually reverted to the Swedish crown. The abbey was sacked by the Danish army in the wars between Denmark and Sweden in 1709-1710. Karl XI of Sweden ordered the ruined abbey buildings to be demolished and the materials transported to Malmö to build his German Church. The only existing remnant of the abbey is part of the old sacristy of the church which was used as a shed.

== Later history ==
Herrevad was put at the disposal of the Northern Skåne Cavalry Regiment in 1691 after the demolition of the monastery complex. By 1727 a new building for the regimental headquarters had been raised from building materials left over from the demolition of the abbey. It later became a residence for the commander, but retained the name Herrevad Abbey. In 1745 the residence was expanded and nicknamed "Herrevad Castle" (Swedish: Herrevads slott) by the soldiers. Two wings were added in 1816-1819 in the Empire style, and the name Herrevad Castle formally adopted. The buildings were used by various military units until 1994 when Herrevad Castle passed into private ownership. It is currently undergoing restoration.

In the 1980s an excavation located the foundations of the choir and parts of the nave, which may still be seen.

== Sources ==
- Places with connection to Tycho Brahe
- Herrevadskloster homepage (Swedish)
- Ljungbyhed, Sweden on Google Maps
- History of Klippan Paper
