= Repatriation (disambiguation) =

Repatriation is the voluntary or involuntary return of travellers and migrants to their place of origin.

Repatriation may also refer to:

- Repatriation (cultural heritage), the return of artifacts to their place of origin
  - Digital repatriation, return in a digital format
  - Repatriation and reburial of human remains
- Repatriation (film), a 2004 South Korean documentary film
- Voluntary return
- Extraordinary repatriation, the return of persons to their country without going through the government of that country
