= Danish Census Book =

13th century Danish chronicle

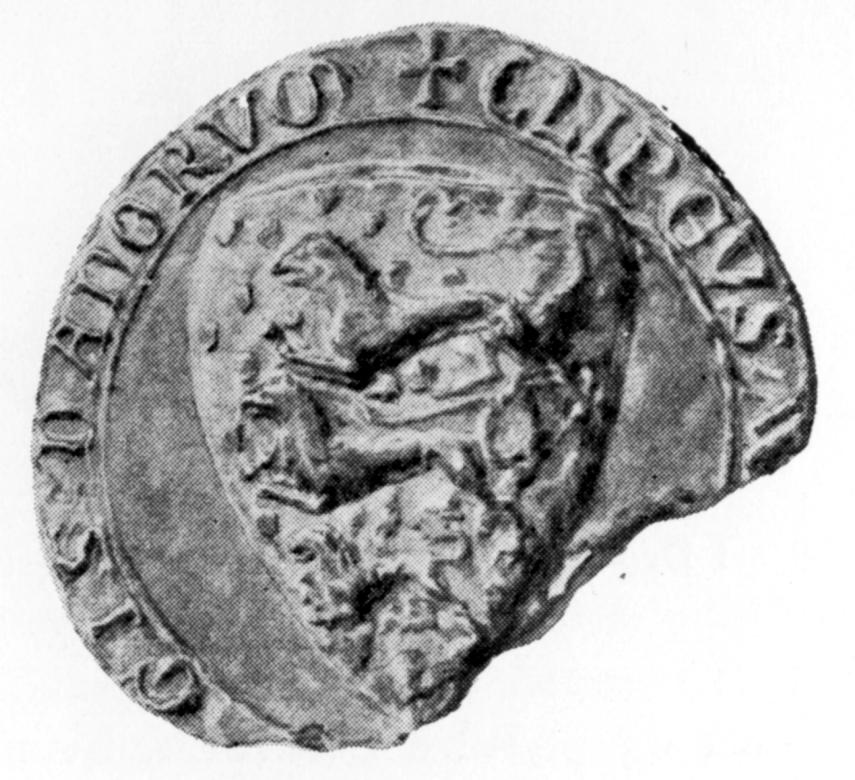
The Seal of King Valdemar II

The Danish Census Book or the Danish book of land taxation (Latin: Liber Census Daniæ, Danish: Kong Valdemars Jordebog) dates from the 13th century and consists of a number of separate manuscripts. The original manuscripts are now housed in the Danish National Archives (Rigsarkivet) in Copenhagen.

== History ==
The land registration was commissioned during the reign of King Valdemar II of Denmark (1202–1241). The registry contains notes for practical use in the Royal Chancery of the Kingdom of Denmark. It consists of a collection of information regarding Royal income and properties. The book is one of the most important sources of information in regard to social conditions and place names during the Middle Ages. Many locations in Denmark (which included Schleswig, Scania, Halland and Blekinge), northern Germany, southern Sweden and northern Estonia were recorded in writing for the first time.

== See also ==
- Codex Holmiensis
- History of Denmark
