= Tvis Abbey =

Former Cistercian monastery in Denmark

Coordinates: 56.3503°N 8.685°E

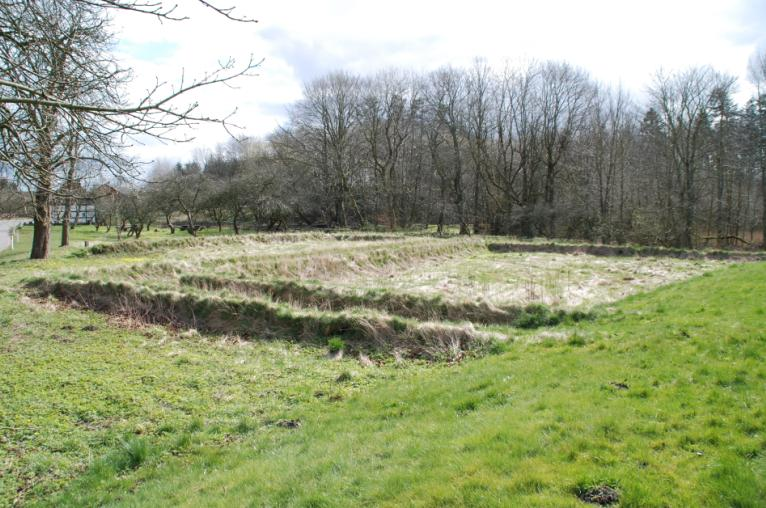
Foundations of Tvis Abbey

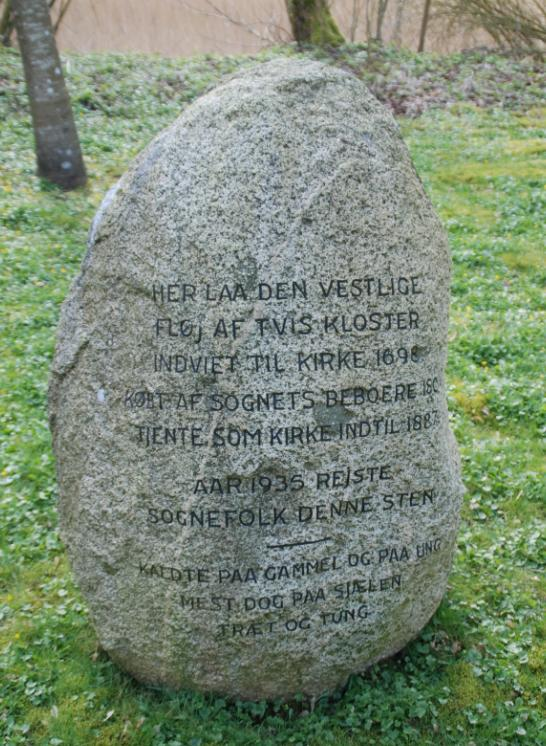
Tvis Abbey memorial stone

Tvis Abbey (Danish: Tvis Kloster; Latin: Tutta vallis) is a former Cistercian monastery in Denmark. It was situated on a small island between the Storå and the Tvis Å rivers, a few kilometres south of Holstebro in Jutland.

== History ==
The abbey was founded in 1163 by Prince Buris Henriksson (1130-1167), earl of Jutland, who was the son of Danish lord Henrik Skadelår and the brother of Swedish King Magnus Henriksson (c. 1130–1161). It was a daughter house of Herrevad Abbey (Herrevad kloster) in Scania (now in Sweden) and was established with a substantial endowment of property near the village of Holstebro. The abbey was dissolved during the Reformation, probably in 1547. The abbey church, which served as a parish church, was demolished, apparently in 1698, after which a replacement was set up in the west wing, but that too was demolished after the construction of a new parish church in 1887. Today there are no visible remains apart from the foundations. In 1935, a memorial stone was erected over the site of the altar in the middle of the cemetery.

== Other Sources ==
- Andersen, Anders, 1978: Tvis Kloster, online at http://tviskirke.dk/brochure/tviskloster.pdf (in Danish)
