= Danish Code =

Title of a Danish statute book from 1683

Danish Code (Danish: Danske Lov) is the title of a Danish statute book from 1683 that previously formed the basis for the Danish legislation. Even though it was mainly a compilation of older, regional laws, it took seven different commissions over several decades under two different monarchs to put the Code together. In 1687, Norway received its Norwegian Code, which in form and content is about identical to the Danish Code. The Danish Code has been translated into English, Latin, German and Russian.

The statute should be viewed in connection with the European traditions of justice, which since the 12th century has moved towards an assembly of different practices. This tradition was encouraged by the Catholic Church. The majority of the statute has now been superseded by newer laws. However, parts of the Code are still in force, e.g. 3-19-2, which states that an employer is responsible for compensation for damages that an employee might cause during his/her employment.

== Background ==
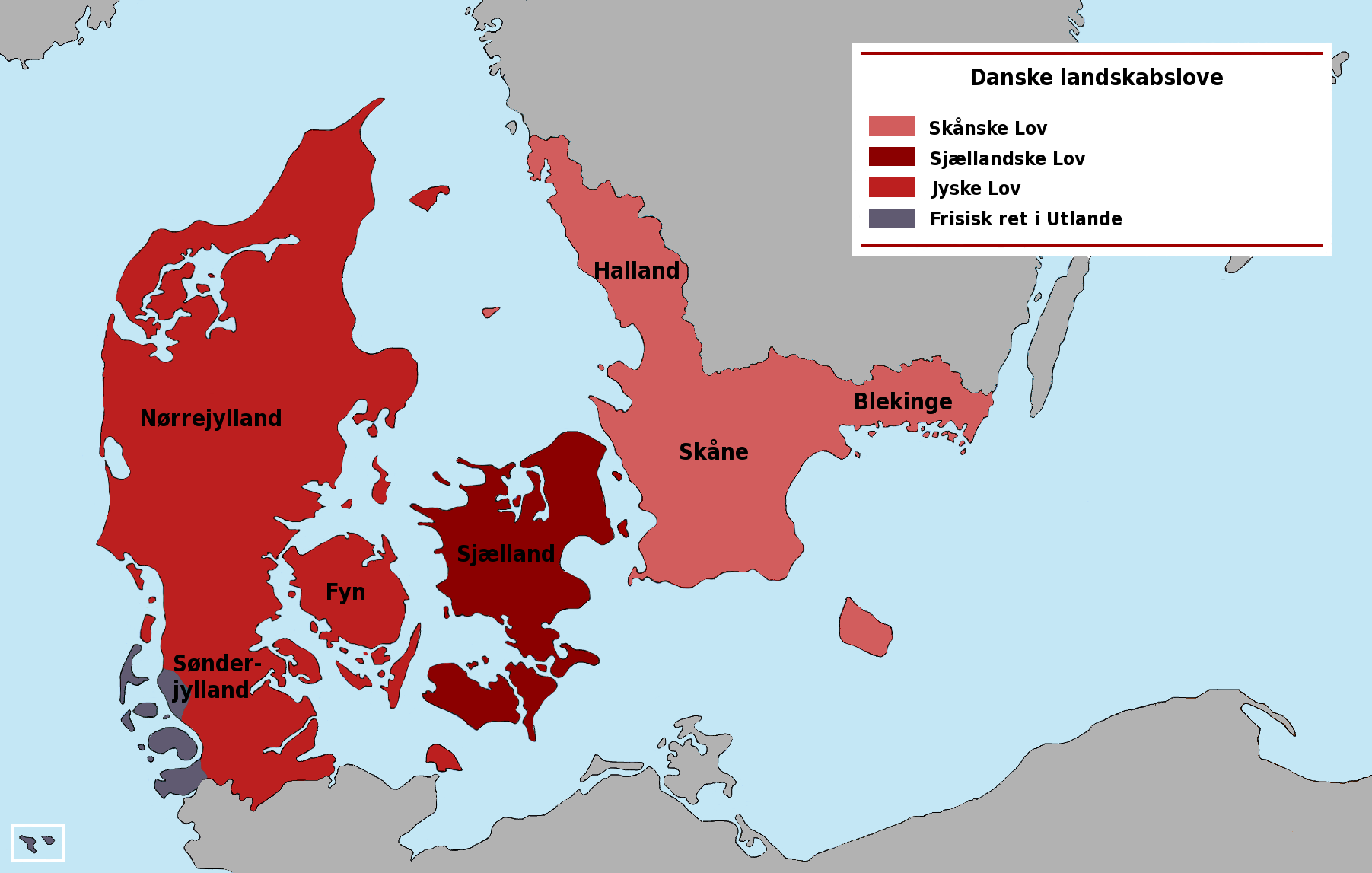
Prior to the adoption of the Danish Code, each landskab had its own legal code, except for the Uthlande (in grey) which followed Frisian Law.

The historical book Gesta Danorum by Saxo Grammaticus, which is dated to the 13th century, describes the Danish kings' attempts at legislation. One of the first examples of Danish legislation was 'Vederloven' from the 1180s, that regulated the personal army of the king, also known as the Housecarls. This was superseded by a series of regional laws, first Scanian Law, later Jyske Lov and Sjællandske Lov. Generally, the regional laws are based on Casuistry. This means that they are based on concrete cases of breaches of the law, and describe how the conflict is to be solved. However, the rules of procedure are broad.

== History ==
=== The two first Law Committees and Peder Lassen ===
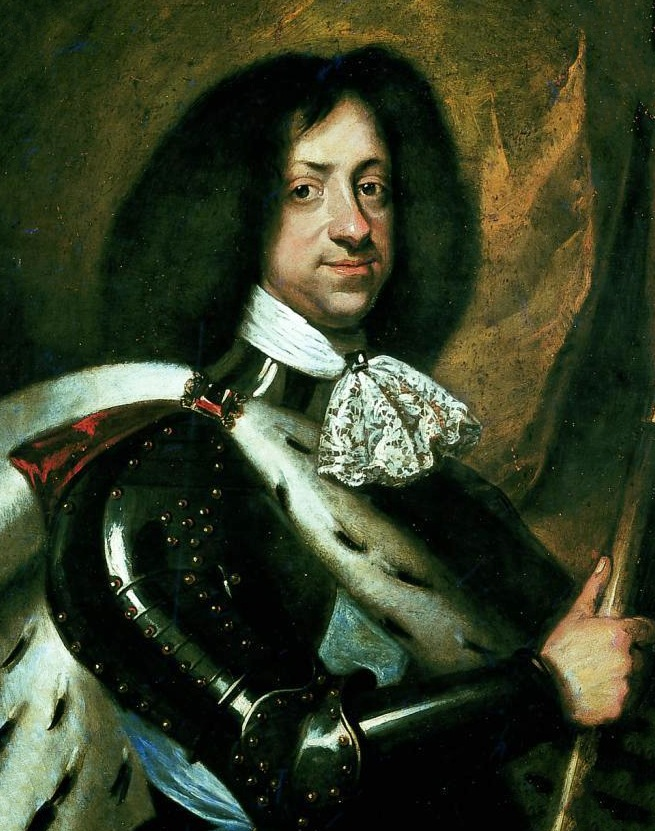
Christian V of Denmark

Immediately after gaining absolute power King Frederick III appointed a commission to scrutinize the laws of the kingdom, to identify laws that were in conflict with the absolute power of the king and to work out a new procedure for the administration of justice. The Danish Code is seen as being born of necessity, as justice was at the time administered on the basis of a large number of somewhat contradictory laws.

Additionally, the division of Denmark into two judiciary areas, based on Jutland and Zealand respectively was seen as bothersome and anachronistic. On January 12, 1661, the State College (Danish: Statskollegiet), a governing body overseeing the workings of the government, published a report suggesting to work out a comprehensive Danish Code. King Frederick III then established The First Law Committee consisting of 3 jurists (including Supreme Court Assessor Peder Lassen), 8 noblemen and 10 civilians. Work in the first Committee broke down, one of the causes being that the noblemen were unhappy with the suggested diminishing of their privileges.

On November 16, 1662, the King replaced the first Committee with the Second Law Committee consisting of the former Committee's four foremost legal experts, Peder Lassen, Heinrich Ernst, Otte Krag and Niels Trolle. The Committee drafted several completely new statutes, and especially Peder Lassens suggestions regarding inheritance were ahead of their time in Denmark. The committee's suggestions regarding laws of legal procedure were handed to the State College, which replied positively in July, 1664. To revise the suggestions, the Second Law Committee was expanded with four jurists from the State College, after which the work began to decline once again.

=== The third Law Committee and Rasmus Vinding ===
A third Committee was established on February 23, 1666, consisting of Peder Lassen, Vice Treasurer Holger Vind, State College Assessor Christoffer Parsberg and Supreme Court judge Rasmus Vinding. The new Committee reflected the influence of statesman Peder Schumacher (Count Griffenfeld after his ennoblement), as both Parsberg and Vinding were his close friends. The third Committee started off a lengthy conflict between Lassen and Vinding regarding the Code, as Lassen was the professional jurist, while Vinding lacked legal training. A professor of history and geography, Vinding had a good reputation as a gifted judge, but lacked in-depth knowledge of the Danish laws.

Work in the Third Committee did not get under way, so on March 8, 1666, Frederick III of Denmark ordered each of the committee's four members to compile and revise their own set of laws, removing outdated statutes from the Danish system of legal writs. In practice, all earlier work was abandoned, which was a defeat for Lassen who had been the driving force so far, and perhaps a tactical move by the King to have him superseded by Vinding. Of the four submitted drafts, Vinding's so-called Codex Fredericus gained the best reception, after which legislative work dwindled down again. Meanwhile, Lassen kept his rejected draft at hand should Vinding's draft be turned down.

By the late 1660s, Vinding's friend Peder Schumacher was appointed as Assessor both to the State College and the Supreme Court. He used his influence with the King to get Vinding's draft approved, so Vinding by a secret order on March 11, 1669, was given the task of drafting the new body of laws, Corpus juris Danici. By the end of 1669, Vinding put forth his suggestions, which was an updated version of his earlier Codex Fredericus, but with a more systematic setup and fewer outdated or contradictory sections. The content of the text was mainly old laws coupled with new laws based on earlier verdicts (i.e. Common Law).

=== Revisions under Christian V ===
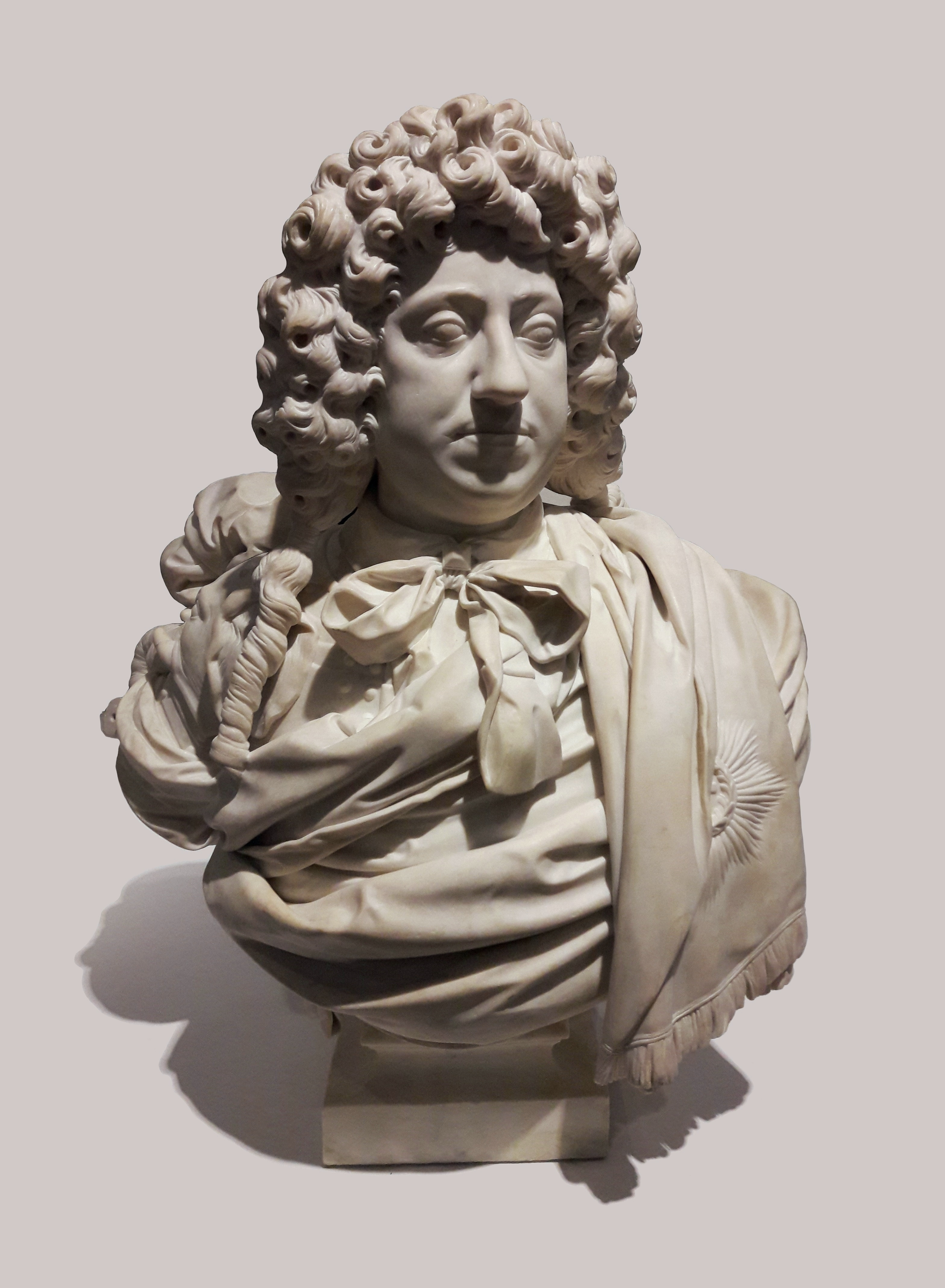
Marble bust of Christian V of Denmark by Christian Nerger, 1680s, National Museum in Warsaw

After the death of King Frederick III in 1670, legislative work slowed down again. Peder Schumacher's (now Count Griffenfeld) interest in the project also died down.

First Committee: After a long break, on September 24, 1672, a three-person Revision Committee was established to revise Rasmus Vindings draft. The three members were Peder Lassen, Attorney General Peder Lauridsen Scavenius and chancellor Peder Reedtz, who headed the committee. Bishop Hans Vandal was also connected to the work, revising the sections dealing with the clergy. Lassen criticized Vinding's division of the Code into five parts, suggesting only three parts instead. However, his criticism was not as vehement as previously, perhaps because he tired out – Lassen had been connected with the project since its beginning 11 years earlier. Lassen's revisions to the draft are mostly corrections of misunderstandings, with very few highly negative comments. Thus, Vinding and Griffenfeld (previously Schumacher) had won the battle over the layout of the text.

Second Committee: With the death of committee leader Reedz on July 10, 1674, Griffenfeld took over. He created the Second Revision Committee by including his brother-in-law, mayor of Copenhagen Jørgen Fogh and his friend Vinding in the committee. When Griffenfeld fell from power on March 11, 1676, work on the Danish Code stopped completely for four years.

Third Committee: On February 28, 1680, a royal missive was published establishing the Third Revision Committee. It consisted of 13 members, among these the three clergymen bishop Hans Bagger, Royal Confessor Hans Leth and professor in theology Kristian Nold. Work in the committee broke down, mainly because of the clergymen who unsuccessfully tried to demolish the committee. The sticking point was the rights of confession of foreigners living in Denmark, especially the exiled French Huguenots.

Fourth Committee: The drawn out arguments caused Christian V of Denmark to appoint a Fourth Revision Committee on April 16, 1681, consisting of four people, among these Rasmus Vinding. They were selected to complete a final revision of the Code, and they made many minor changes and additions to the previous draft. The committee completed its work by the end of 1681, and the King approved the Danish Code on January 3, 1682. Small corrections continued to be made until June 23, where the Law was printed, even though it was officially completed on April 15, the King's birthday.

== Contents ==
In addition to the oaths sworn by judges and witnesses, the Danish code contains six books:

- 1: Om Retten og Rettens Personer (The court and people at the court)
- 2: Om Religion og Geistligheden (Religion and the clergy)
- 3: Om Verdslig- og Huus-Stand (Temporal positions)
- 4: Om Søretten (The maritime law)
- 5: Om Adkomst, Gods og Gield (Inheritance, estate and debt)
- 6: Om Misgierninger (Misdeeds)

== Implication and importance of the Code ==
The final Danish Code is first and foremost based on earlier Danish legislative work. Roman law, which held great influence in Europe outside Scandinavia at the time, can only be traced in a few places. This fits well with the main purpose, which since the Third Law Committee was to compile already existing laws into a more useful format. Thus, the Danish Code only treated new areas to a limited extent.

The enactment of the Danish law is a milestone in the history of law in Denmark and even in Northern Europe, being notable in the evolution of the Danish legal system from medieval law to the modern legal system.

The codification of Danish law had the purpose of establishing royal prestige by Frederick III and Christian V.

It was partly addressed at regarding economic development and centralisation in Denmark, by creation of a more encompassing single, authorized statutory text. The Danish judicial area was previously divided into Jutland and Zealand. Specifically, the contradiction between what most tend to call the ‘civil’ and ‘commercial’ or ‘private’ law represented by Scanian Law and the law of the Jyske Lov was instead resolved by the enactment of the Danish Law under the rule of Christian V.

Some have made claims about its "progressive" character compared to the Europe of its time, in particular progressive nature of Danish law is reflected in the law of inheritance, made according to Peder Lassen's proposal. The Lov outlawed “crimes against nature “(Danish: omgængelse mod naturen), a collective term for a group of sexual acts including sodomy and bestiality; the prescribed punishment was that of burning at the stake.

Some later professors of law and history, notably the famed late 18th and early 19th century Danish jurist Anders Sandøe Ørsted, as well as, Edvard Holm, have commented that the promulgation of the Danske Lov was one particularly positive aspect of the period of absolute monarchy in Denmark. This enactment followed in form the moves made by many European absolute monarchies at the time, in the desire to create a separate, independent and centralised body of law in the Kingdom and ‘nation’ (with a somewhat different understanding of the latter term than had sometimes later been used). However, Stig Iuul holds that earlier legislation deserves the credit because the Danish Code is mostly a compilation.

The English envoy to Denmark at the time, Robert Molesworth, praises the Danish Code in his otherwise highly negative text, An account of Denmark as it was in the year 1692. He states that in justice, brevity and clarity, the ‘Code surpasses all other legal texts he knows of’ - ‘it is so clear and simple to understand, that any literate person can understand his case and is able to represent himself in Court if he so wishes’, perhaps a rather fanciful statement about the imagined social significance of the text.

In later centuries, the law was subject to amendments and attempts at scholarly systematisations but was not treated as an all-encompassing, single universal ‘system’ or ‘source’ of law. Over time, it was not replaced, and its significance weakened, but certain of its provision are still relevant and invoked in judicial decisions.

== Sources ==
- Stig Iuul, Kodifikation eller Kompilation? - Christian V's Danske Lov paa baggrund af ældre Ret, G.E.C. Gads Forlag, 1954.
- (Danish) History of Law at the Department of Law at University of Copenhagen
