= Skåneland =

Region in Southern Scandinavia

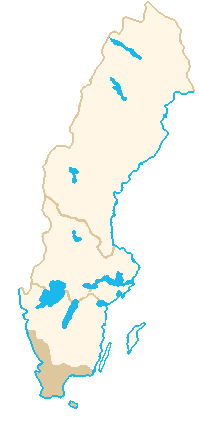
The historic region Skåneland (the Scanian provinces) in brown, consisting of the traditional Swedish provinces Blekinge, Halland and Scania, and what is now the Danish island Bornholm

Skåneland is a region on the southern Scandinavian Peninsula. It includes the Swedish provinces of Blekinge, Halland, and Scania. The Danish island of Bornholm is traditionally also included. Skåneland has no official recognition or function and the term is not in common usage. Equivalent terms in English and Latin are "the Scanian Provinces" and "Terrae Scaniae" respectively. The term is mostly used in historical contexts and not in daily speech. In Danish, Skånelandene is used more often. The terms have no political implications as the region is not a political entity but a cultural region, without officially established administrative borders.

The provinces making up Skåneland were part of Denmark from at least the 9th century, sometimes referred to as the "Eastern Province", after the 12th-century civil war called the Scanian Uprising. Blekinge was a part of Sweden until the early 13th century when it became part of Denmark (the Danish Census Book contains the first secure written evidence of Danish control). The provinces were part of the territory ceded to Sweden in 1658 under the Treaty of Roskilde, but after an uprising on Bornholm, that island was returned to Denmark in 1660, under the Treaty of Copenhagen. Since then, the Dano–Swedish border has remained unchanged in times of peace.

== Etymology ==
The name Skåneland was first recorded in print (in Swedish) in 1719. It is unclear what area is meant. Later (1751) Carl Linnaeus uses it, meaning the province of Scania. The modern use of the denomination as a short form for De skånska landskapen ("The Scanian provinces"), for the combined area of the provinces of Blekinge, Halland and Scania, was launched by the Swedish historian and Scandinavist Martin Weibull (1835-1902) in Samlingar till Skånes historia (Föreningen för Skånes Fornminnen och Historia. published 1868-73 in six volumes) in order to illuminate the shared history of Scania, Blekinge, and Halland.

Weibull used the term as a combined term for the four provinces where the Scanian Law had its jurisdiction, as well as the area of the archdiocese of Lund until the Reformation in 1536, later the Danish Lutheran diocese of Lund. This form of Skåneland was then used in the regional historical periodical Historisk tidskrift för Skåneland, beginning in 1901, published by Martin's son, Lauritz Weibull.

== Historical administration ==
An earlier administrative and political function of the area was to serve as a core area for one of the three provincial things that together elected the king of Denmark. The first Danish administrative sub-divisioning occurred as part of the centralization process, when the area became divided into administrative units called hundreds (herreder in Danish). The hundreds were possibly based on older, already existing units, but the establishment of the new form of hundreds was prompted by an increase in royal power during the High Middle Ages. These differed from the provincial thing areas in that they were not local communities joined under a governing assembly but top-down regional divisions established to ensure royal authority. These medieval Danish hundreds were used to implement military obligations and to expedite the collection of renders due to the king in the provinces. They were first established in Jutland, where they replaced previous administrative units called syssel. According to some scholars, they were introduced in Skåneland possibly as early as the 11th century.

In the 13th century, a new fiscal system was introduced and the hundreds were gradually included into larger administrative units called len, with a castle serving as the administrative center. This new administrative development was a result of the increased power of the aristocracy. In each len, a noble man was put in charge, with the title lensmand.

Each of the four provinces of Skåneland had representation in the Scanian Thing, which, along with the other two Things of the Danish state (Jutland and Zealand), elected the Danish king.

The four Scanian provinces were joined under the jurisdiction of the Scanian Law, dated 1200–1216, the oldest Nordic provincial law. In the chapter "Constitutional history" in Danish Medieval History, New Currents, the three provincial Things are described as being the legal authority that instituted changes suggested by the elected king. The suggestions for changes submitted by the king had to be approved by the three Things before being passed into law in the Danish state.

== Current status and usage of the term ==
Halland

Scania

Blekinge

Bornholm

Skåneland is strictly a historic and cultural region. The name has long appeared as a term used in historical contexts in a variety of sources. The southern part of Sweden, including Skåneland, is since 1658 considered to be included in Götaland, one of three historic "lands of Sweden".

As in other cultural regions, regionalism in Scania sometimes has a base in regional nationalism and sometimes in a more general opposition against centralized state nationalism or expansionist nationalism. As noted about regionalism in Norway, Scandinavian regionalism is not necessarily separatist.

There are a number of minor organisations promoting the use of the term, mainly active online, e.g. Föreningen Skånelands Framtid or Skåneländsk Samling, the Skåneland Football Federation, and Stiftelsen Skåneländska Flaggans Dag.

The flag of Scania, also the proposed, unofficial flag of Skåneland, registered with Scandinavian Roll of Arms as a cultural symbol for the region

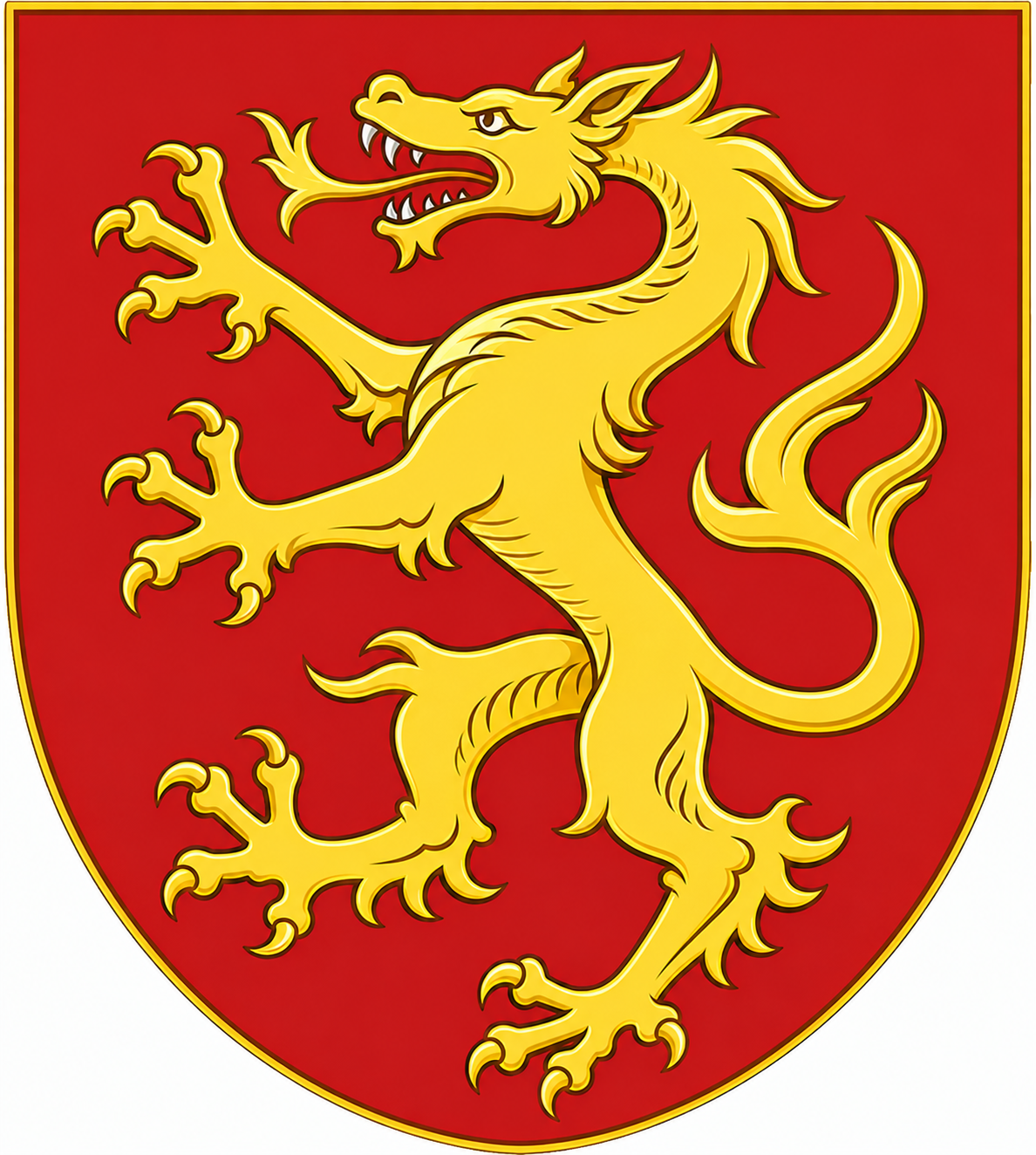
The proposed, unofficial coat of arms of Skåneland, as enrolled in the Scandinavian Roll of Arms (1991–1992 edition).

The private foundation Stiftelsen Skånsk Framtid ("foundation for a Scanian future") was a member of the Unrepresented Nations and Peoples Organization (UNPO) from 1993 to 2011, representing Skåneland under the name of Scania.

== History ==
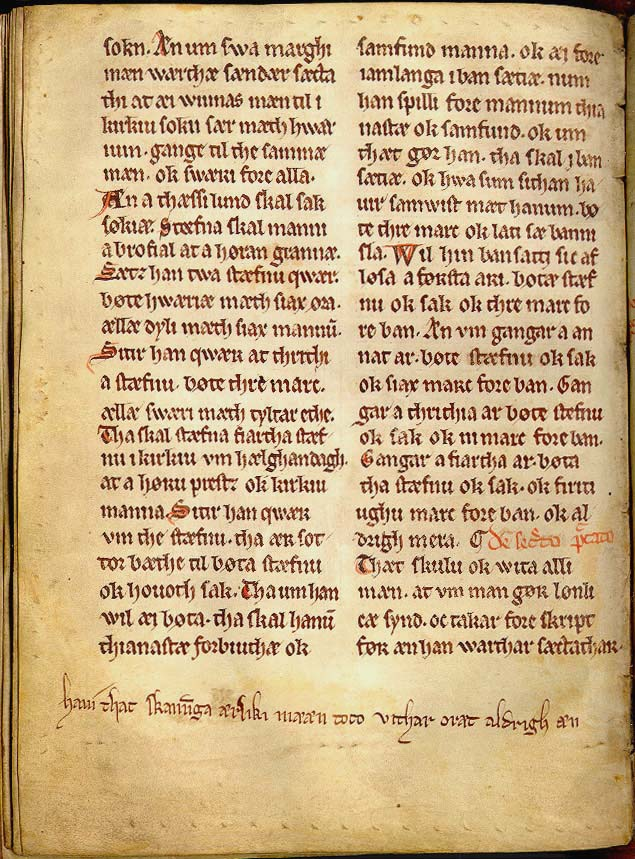
Anders Sunesøn's 13th-century version of the Scanian Law and Church Law, containing a comment in the margin called the "Skaaningestrof" (the Scanian stanza): "Hauí that skanunga ærliki mææn toco vithar oræt aldrigh æn." (Let it be known that Scanians are honorable men who have never tolerated injustice.)

=== Population and settlements ===
The earliest Danish historians, writing in the 12th and 13th century, believed that the Danish Kingdom had existed since king Dan, in a distant past. Eighth century sources mention the existence of Denmark as a kingdom. According to 9th century Frankish sources, by the early 9th century many of the chieftains in the south of Scandinavia acknowledged Danish kings as their overlords, though kingdom(s) were very loose confederations of lords until the last couple medieval centuries saw some increased centralization. The west and south coast of modern Sweden was so effectively part of the Danish realm that the said area (and not the today Denmark) was known as "Denmark" (literally the frontier of the Daner). Svend Estridsen (King of Denmark 1047 – ca. 1074), who may have been from Scania himself, is often referred to as the king who along with his dynasty established Scania as an integral part of Denmark. Blekinge was a part of Sweden until the early 13th century when it became part of Denmark (the Danish Census Book contains the first secure written evidence of Danish control).

=== From 1397 to 1658 ===
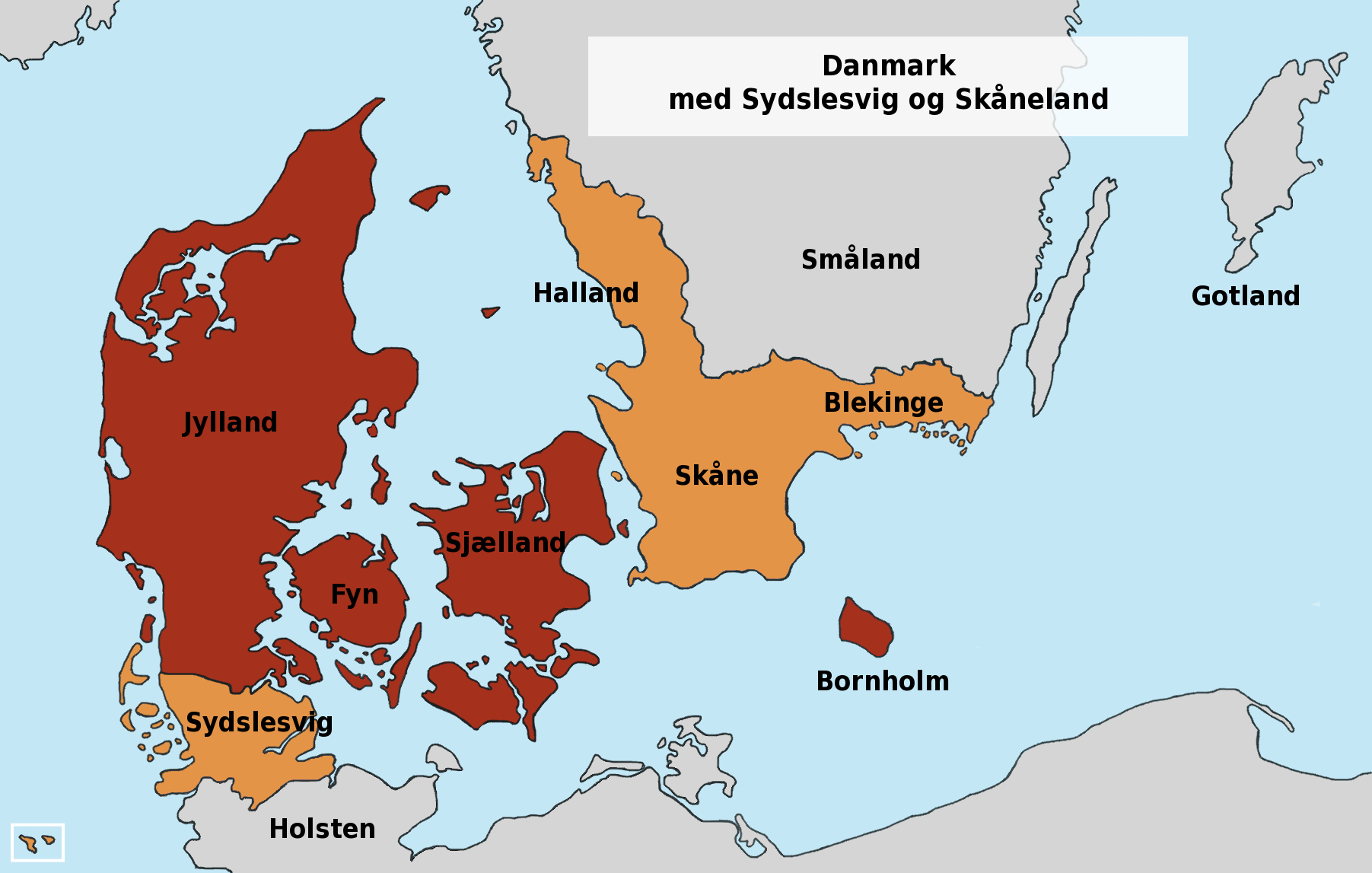
Today's Denmark and the former Danish provinces Southern Schleswig, Skåne, Halland and Blekinge.

When the Kalmar Union was formed in 1397, the union was administered from Copenhagen. By 1471 Sweden rebelled under Sture family leadership. In 1503, when Sten Sture the Elder died, Sweden's independence from the union had been established.

In 1600 Denmark controlled virtually all land bordering on Skagerrak, Kattegat, and the Sound. The current Swedish provinces of Skåne, Blekinge and Halland were Danish and the province of Bohuslän was Norwegian. Skåneland became the site of harsh fighting, especially in the 16th, 17th and 18th century, as Denmark and Sweden confronted each other for control of the Baltic.

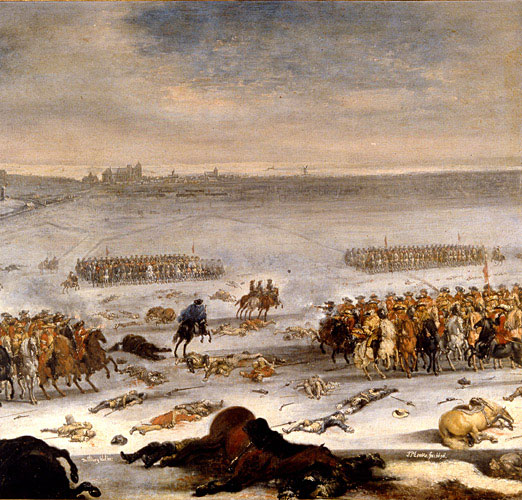
Painting by Swedish-German artist Johan Philip Lemke of the 1676 Battle of Lund during the Scanian War, the bloodiest battle ever fought between Denmark and Sweden

Sweden intervened in the Danish civil war known as the Count's Feud (1534–1536), launching a highly destructive invasion of Skåneland as the ally of later king Christian III, who upon his coronation introduced Protestantism to the provinces. Subsequently, in the period between the breakup of the Kalmar Union and 1814, Denmark and Sweden fought in Skåneland in 11 separate wars and other border provinces: the Northern Seven Years' War (1563–1570), Kalmar War (1611–1613), Torstenson War (1644–1645), Second Northern War (1657–1658 and 1659–1660), Scanian War (1674–1678), Great Northern War (1700 and 1709–1720), Theater War (1788), and the Napoleonic Wars (1808–1809 and 1814).

- During the Northern Seven Years' War, attacks were launched on Sweden from Danish Halland in 1563, and Swedish counterattacks were launched against Danish provinces of Halland and Skåne in 1565 and 1569. In 1570 peace was finally agreed when the Swedish king withdrew the claims to Danish Skåne, Halland, Blekinge and Gotland, while the Danes withdrew their claims to Sweden as a whole.
- During the Torstenson War, a theater of the Thirty Years' War, extensive combat took place in the Danish provinces of Skåne, Halland, and Blekinge. By the Second Treaty of Brömsebro (1645) Denmark ceded the Norwegian provinces of Jämtland and Härjedalen and agreed Sweden was to occupy the Danish province of Halland for 30 years as a guarantee of the treaty provisions.
- During the Second Northern War (1655–1658), Danish attempts to recover control of Halland ended in a serious defeat administered by Sweden. As a result, in the Treaty of Roskilde (1658), which was largely confirmed by the Treaty of Copenhagen (1660), Denmark ceded the provinces of Skåne, Blekinge and Halland (i.e., Skåneland).

Vilhelm Moberg (1898–1973) in Min Svenska Historia II (Norstedts. 1971) provides a thoughtful discussion of the atrocities which were committed by both sides in the struggle over the border provinces, and identified them as the source of propaganda to inflame people passions to continue the struggle. These lopsided representations were incorporated into history text books on the respective sides. As an example, Moberg compares the history texts he grew up with in Sweden which represented the Swedish soldier as ever pure and honorable to a letter written by Gustavus Adolphus celebrating the 24 Scanian parishes he had helped level by fire, with the troops encouraged to rape and murder the population at will, behavior that may well have been mirrored equally on the Danish side. Skåneland was a rather unpleasant place to dwell for an extended period.

=== Assimilation with Sweden ===
Following the Treaty of Roskilde in 1658, the Swedish government in 1683 demanded that the leading social groups of Skåneland accept Swedish customs and laws. Swedish became the only language permitted in Church liturgy and in schools, religious literature in Danish was banned, and all appointed politicians and priests were required to be Swedish. To promote further Swedish assimilation, the University of Lund was inaugurated in 1666; the inhabitants of Scania were not allowed to enroll in Copenhagen University until the 19th century.

The population initially opposed the Swedish reforms, as can be ascertained from church records and court transcripts. The Swedes did encounter civil revolts in many areas, including the Göinge district, in dense forest regions of northern Scania. The Swedish authorities resorted to extreme measures against the 17th-century rebels who were described as snapphanar, a term used for raiding enemy soldiers or bandits. The punishments included the use of impalement breaking on the wheel, as well as the nailing of bodies to church doors. In that way, it could take four to five days before the victim died.

The transformation of age-old customs, commerce and administration to the Swedish model could not be effected quickly or easily. In the first fifty years of the transition, the treatment of the population was quite harsh. Denmark made several attempts to recapture the territories, the last in 1710, but ultimately conceded the territories as lost.

Before 1658, one of the provinces of Skåneland, Scania proper, had consisted of four counties: the counties of Malmøhus, Landskrone, Helsingborg and Christianstad. When Skåneland was annexed by Sweden, one of the counties of Scania, Kristianstad County, was merged with Blekinge to form one of a total of three Blekinge counties.

=== Bornholm rebellion ===
In 1658, shortly after the Swedish Lieutenant Colonel Johan Printzensköld (ca. 1615 – 8 December 1658) was sent to Bornholm to start the assimilation process, the population of Bornholm rebelled. Led by Jens Pedersen Kofoed (1628-1691) and Poul Anker (1629-1697) the rebellion formed in the town of Hasle, north of the largest city, Rønne. Before the rebel army reached the Swedish headquarters in Rønne, Printzenskiold was shot by Willum Clausen in the street of Sølvgade, in central Rønne. The Swedish fled the island as a result of the confusion and fear amongst the conscripts; Jens Kofoed installed an intermediate rule and sent a message to King Frederick III of Denmark that Bornholm had liberated itself, and wished to return to Danish rule. This was confirmed in the 1660 peace settlement between Denmark and Sweden.

=== Swedish administration ===
Map from 1710 of "Scaniae" (Skåneland), consisting of the provinces "Scania, Hallandia et Blekingia"

Sweden appointed a Governor General, who in addition to having the highest authority of the government, also was the highest military officer. The first to hold the post of Governor General was Gustaf Otto Stenbock, between 1658 and 1664. His residence was in the largest city, Malmö.

The office of Governor General was abandoned in 1669, deemed unnecessary. However, when the Scanian War erupted in 1675, the office was reinstated, and Fabian von Fersen (1626–1677) held the office between 1675 and 1677, when he died in the defence of Malmö. He was replaced by Rutger von Ascheberg (1621–1693) in 1680 who held it to his death in 1693. It was during Ascheberg's time in office that the stricter policy of Swedification was initiated, as a reaction to the threats of war and possible Danish liberation.

Following the death of Ascheberg, the Governor Generalship was dismantled into a separate county governor for each of the Swedish provinces Blekinge, Halland and Scania. However, a Governor Generalship was reinstated in the province of Scania during the Napoleonic War, when Johan Christopher Toll (1743–1817) became the last Governor-General in the region, a post he held 1801–09.

On 15 June 1811, the Swedish military killed "around 30" and wounded "around 60" peasants in Klågerup. The Swedish army units also arrested 395 people of which 2 were beheaded at Stortorget square in Malmö at 4 November 1811.

=== Recent history ===
The complete history of Skåneland was not taught for a long time in schools in Skåneland, especially during periods with the immediate threat of revolt. Instead a Swedish-centric history was taught, and the Scanian history before 1658, for instance concerning the list of monarchs, was disregarded as a component of Danish history. In reaction, a movement began in the late 20th century to revive awareness of the history and culture of Skåneland. The renewed focus resulted in the publication of several books about Scanian history.

== See also ==
- History of Denmark
- History of Sweden
- Lands of Denmark
- Lands of Sweden
- Dominions of Sweden
- Sweden proper
