= Schleswig War =

There are two wars that are named Schleswig War:

- the First Schleswig War
- and the Second Schleswig War
