= Digital repatriation =

Digital repatriation (or digital restitution) is the return of cultural heritage items in a digital format to the communities from which they originated. The term originated from within anthropology and typically referred to the creation of digital photographs of ethnographic material, which would then be made available to members of the originating culture. However, the term has also been applied to museum, library, and archives collections (not least in respect to decolonization initiatives), and can refer not only to digital photographs of items but also to digital collections and virtual exhibits including 3D scans and audio recordings. Intangible cultural heritage, which includes traditional skills and knowledge, can also be digitally repatriated to communities.

Digital repatriation is becoming increasingly relevant as more cultural institutions make their collections available online. This increased access is sometimes at odds with the desires of the originating culture since it limits their ability to curate and define terms of access to their cultural materials. Many cultural institutions are making efforts to involve communities in collection display and description, with recent efforts of cultural heritage-specific institutions to return control and access of digital materials to original cultures. This has led to the development of software and tools to help achieve these goals.

== Digital surrogates ==
Proponents of digital surrogacy argue that it can benefit originating cultures, scholars, and educators. For originating cultures, digital surrogates can make cultural objects accessible to dispersed populations, reunite collections of physically scattered objects, or provide access to objects for which physical repatriation is challenging. Digital surrogates can provide an interactive experience for community members and inspire new community engagement with cultural objects. High-quality digital surrogates can aid with the preservation of the original objects, provide documentation for collections management, and give scholars access to the surrogates for continued study regardless of where the original artifacts are located. However, scholars caution that digital surrogates are alternative representations of an object rather than replacements for the original objects.

== Tangible vs. Intangible Heritage ==
Cultural Heritage encompasses both intangible and tangible elements that collectively define a community's identity and legacy. Intangible Cultural Heritage includes recordings of songs, ceremonies, stories, and other non-physical elements that reflect a community’s collective memory and identity. It encompasses cultural, esoteric, and traditional ecological knowledge and genetic information. These elements are deeply connected to a community’s spiritual and cultural life, evolving through generations. Tangible Cultural Heritage, in contrast, consists of physical artifacts, monuments, and sacred sites, which are tied to specific geographical and historical contexts. These items provide material representations of a community’s heritage and are often regarded as symbols of historical continuity, spiritual significance, or artistic achievement. Tangible heritage is embedded within physical and cultural landscapes, influencing its meaning and use.

Although distinct, both intangible and tangible heritage face overlapping challenges in the context of digitization. Intangible heritage often contains culturally sensitive information that originating communities seek to protect and manage internally. The digitization process can expose these materials to risks of misrepresentation, unauthorized use, or overexposure, particularly when undertaken without appropriate consultation with the originating community. These concerns are grounded in historical practices where cultural materials were appropriated or reframed to align with external narratives, sometimes reinforcing biased representations of originating communities.

Tangible heritage also faces similar complexities. While digital representations of physical artifacts, such as 3D models or virtual archives, are widely recognized as valuable tools for preservation and accessibility, they often fail to capture the full material, spatial, and emotional significance of the original items. The relocation of artifacts to distant museums or archives, often in foreign countries, further separates these objects from their communities of origin, complicating efforts to convey their full meaning, even when digital surrogates are available. Although logistical factors, such as the fragility of objects or limited resources in some communities, are cited as barriers to physical repatriation in ongoing discussions about digitization, some critics argue these factors can also serve as justification for retaining control over artifacts.

Efforts to digitally repatriate traditional and esoteric knowledge have provided originating communities with opportunities to collaborate with cultural heritage institutions, preserving materials and ensuring their accessibility. However, these efforts often highlight imbalances in ownership and control. Many external organizations maintain authority over digitized materials, limiting the ability of originating communities to determine how their heritage is represented and shared. This dynamic reflects historical patterns where colonial powers asserted dominance over cultural items and narratives, frequently excluding the perspectives of those whose heritage was involved. While digitization is often celebrated for its potential to safeguard cultural traditions against erasure and maintain cultural ownership through biological ancestry, it can also reduce communities to static representations, dismissing the complexity of dynamic cultural identities.

== Ethical considerations ==
Repatriation is fraught with ethical and legal challenges regarding ownership of artifacts and materials. Communities within originating cultures seeking to assert ownership over artifacts and materials held in outside institutions may lack the types of documentation that would be accepted in international courts of law, and they may have traditions and beliefs that conflict with Western understandings of individual intellectual property rights.

Institutions creating digital surrogates for digital repatriation may retain copies for institutional use, and digital items can exist in multiple locations simultaneously. Originating cultures may object to replicating or displaying sacred objects, objections that may extend to digital representations of the objects. This has led to problems surrounding who controls access to these digital materials, as many institutions retain the rights to these items. Some institutions have chosen to resolve this ethical challenge by requesting intellectual property rights clearance from the communities in question before publishing digital materials, and offering control over access permissions and representation of digital materials to members of the originating cultures.

The concept of digital colonialism emerges in this context, where the digitization and online dissemination of cultural heritage by external institutions can perpetuate their interpretation of cultural materials, focusing the argument in the inferiority of originating communities' oral history versus the perspectives of colonists. By controlling the digital representations of cultural artifacts, these institutions risk perpetuating historical power dynamics established during colonial rule. For instance, the British Museum's refusal to return Egyptian artifacts such as the Rosetta Stone underscores the enduring legacy of colonial exploitation, where artifacts remain housed far from their places of origin, denying communities full control over their cultural history. This issue is further exemplified by the British destruction and withholding of colonial records during Kenya's Mau Mau uprising, demonstrating how control over cultural information has historically been weaponized to suppress alternative narratives.

Another consideration is where funds are invested to support digital repatriation projects. Trends show that grants are typically given to external organizations over originating communities that are working to preserve their collections. The Karuk people express that one of the biggest challenges is finding the funding to support their digital archive, Sípnuuk.

In addressing these issues, equitable collaboration with originating communities is essential. Ensuring that repatriation efforts, whether digital or physical, respect the rights and values of these communities is critical to overcoming the legacy of exploitation and fostering a more inclusive approach to cultural heritage.

== Software & Technology ==
Digital repatriation relies heavily on the development of software and technology. These developments can benefit Indigenous communities by returning control to these groups and also by expanding access. Working with communities prior to digitizing materials can help determine digital access from the start. There are still barriers to software and technology, such as the digital divide. Internet access and technology are not always feasible for some Indigenous communities, especially groups in remote locations or those who do not have adequate funds.

=== Mukurtu CMS ===
Mukurtu CMS is a software specifically designed for managing and sharing digital heritage in culturally relevant and ethically minded ways. Originally designed in 2007 for the Warumungu people in Australia, Mukurtu CMS has become a popular tool for designing digital archives for Indigenous communities worldwide. This software is open-sourced, meaning it is free and can be shaped to meet the needs of different communities. Mukurtu CMS places the needs and concerns of Indigenous communities at the forefront of its structure and function. It has options for expanded and multiple sets of metadata that are parallel to one another, meaning there is no hierarchy or standard type of metadata.

=== Local Contexts ===
This organization began in 2010 to address intellectual property and cultural heritage within Indigenous communities, particularly in a digital capacity. Through a combination of legal and educational options, Local Contexts help shift cultural authority back to Indigenous communities. One of this organization's more prominent tools is the Local Contexts Traditional Knowledge Labels (or "TK Labels"), which institutions can utilize in digital collections to allow communities to designate certain materials as restricted for access or use. There are currently eighteen labels that help control access. For example, the TK Secret/Sacred label lets users know that the material contains secret or sacred information. The labels are meant to be customizable to individual communities, allowing each community to define what a label means to them.

== Examples ==
The National Museum of the American Indian (USA) and the Museum of New Zealand Te Papa Tongarewa have been particularly active in the bicultural co-curation of digital material. There have also been several successful digital repatriation projects that enable originating communities to manage their own digital materials, which helps limit who can access culturally sensitive materials.

=== Sípnuuk ===
Launched in 2016, Sípnuuk originally started as a food security archive, with the intention of expanding to cover different topics important to the Karuk people. Even though they have maintained their culture and knowledge orally, the Karuk people recognized the importance of having a digital archive to gain sovereignty over their cultural heritage. Sípnuuk now has additional items pertaining to the Karuk language, culture, skills, and traditional knowledge.

There is an effort to gain authority over Karuk's cultural heritage both inside and outside of their community. The Sípnuuk staff work with families within their community to make recommendations about how to care for materials and also to get descriptive metadata directly from families donating knowledge or items to the archive. Because the Karuk people have complete control and authority over their digital archive, they can decide what metadata to use and how they want the public to access or use their materials. Having a controlled vocabulary specific to their culture lets them include the names of items and places in both Karuk and English. To manage who has access to culturally sensitive materials located in Sípnuuk, a review committee appointed by the Karuk Tribal Council handles the requests for sensitive materials. The person or family requesting access to the material must sign a legal document once they are approved, outlining what they can and cannot do with access to the item or information.

=== Passamaquoddy Peoples' Knowledge Portal ===
The Passamaquoddy digital archive was created in 2014 and took advantage of the Mukurtu software. The project originally started in the 1980s with the translation of wax cylinder recordings of the Passamaquoddy people made in 1890. By having these recordings digitally repatriated, the Passamaquoddy people were able to reconnect with their ancestors and learn their language, which had almost been completely lost within their community.

The focus of this archive is the transcription and translation of these recordings, but other parts of the Passamaquoddy culture and history are shared as well. The Passamaquoddy people wanted to be the cultural authorities of these recordings, which is why they decided to create an archive that their entire community could contribute to and access. This archive takes full advantage of the Local Contexts TK Labels to prevent the misuse of the Passamaquoddy cultural heritage, as a lot of the recordings are sacred ceremonies or songs meant only for a certain gender or age group.

== See also ==
- Report on the restitution of African cultural heritage - 2018 Senegalese-French initiative
