= Lands of Denmark =

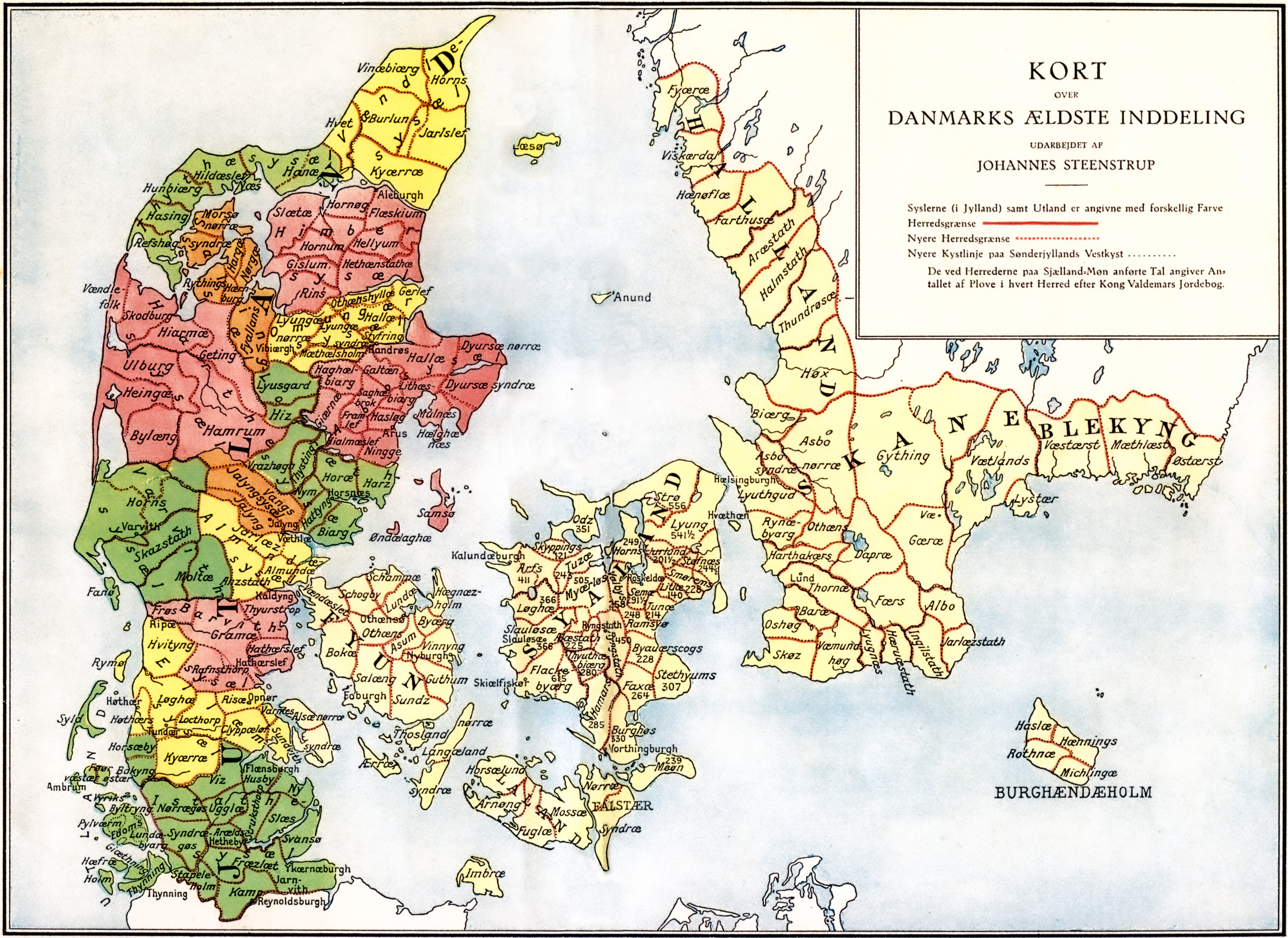
Administrative division of Denmark in medieval times showing herreder and sysler. The entire country was divided into herreder, shown outlined in red. Coloured areas show Jutland's syssel divisions. Zealand's four ecclesiastic sysler are not included.

The three lands of Denmark historically formed the Danish kingdom from its unification and consolidation in the 10th century until the 17th century:

- Zealand (Sjælland) and the islands south of it, with Roskilde as a centre
- Jutland (Jylland), the western peninsula, with Viborg as a centre and the island of Fyn.
- Scania (Skåneland) (until 1658) on the Scandinavian Peninsula, with Lund as a centre

Each of the lands retained its own thing (ting) and statute laws until the late medieval times (Jutlandic Law, Zealandic Law, and Scanian Law). Although Denmark was a unified kingdom, the custom of rendering homage to the King at the three individual assemblies remained. A remnant is the current division of Denmark into two High Court districts, the Eastern and Western High Courts.

During the early 19th century, Zealand and Fyn became administratively united as Østifterne with a provincial assembly in Roskilde. Jutland, the Islands, and Bornholm remain an informal subdivision still used, notably in meteorology and public statistics. Bornholm is the only part to represent Skåneland after the rest of the region was lost to Sweden in 1658. (Bornholm was also lost in 1658, but was recovered two years later.)

In recent decades, the less specific division between Eastern and Western Denmark has also become common, for example when describing logistic, economic and political patterns. Funen may be attributed to both the eastern and western parts of the country, the border line being either the Great Belt or the Little Belt.

== See also ==
- Traditional districts of Denmark
- Subdivisions of Denmark
- Lands of Sweden
- Regions of Norway
