= Scanian Law =

Oldest (13th-c.) Danish provincial law

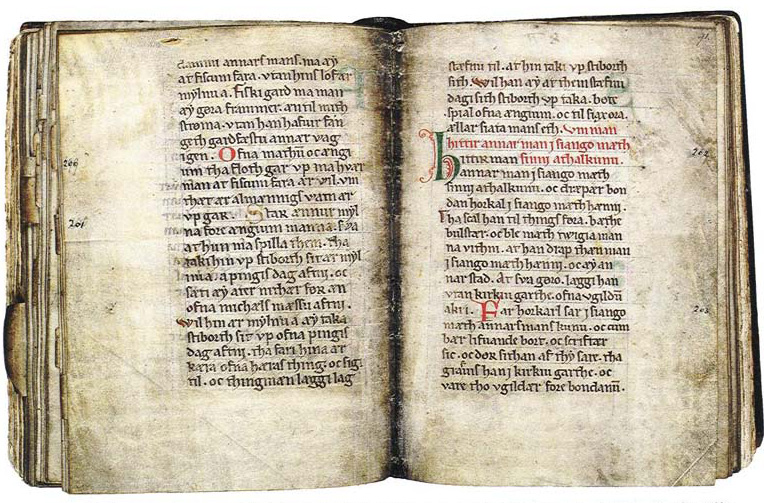
The oldest known vernacular manuscript (B 74) of the Scanian Law and the Scanian Ecclesiastical Law, dated to c. 1250, presently stored at the Royal Library of Sweden, Stockholm.

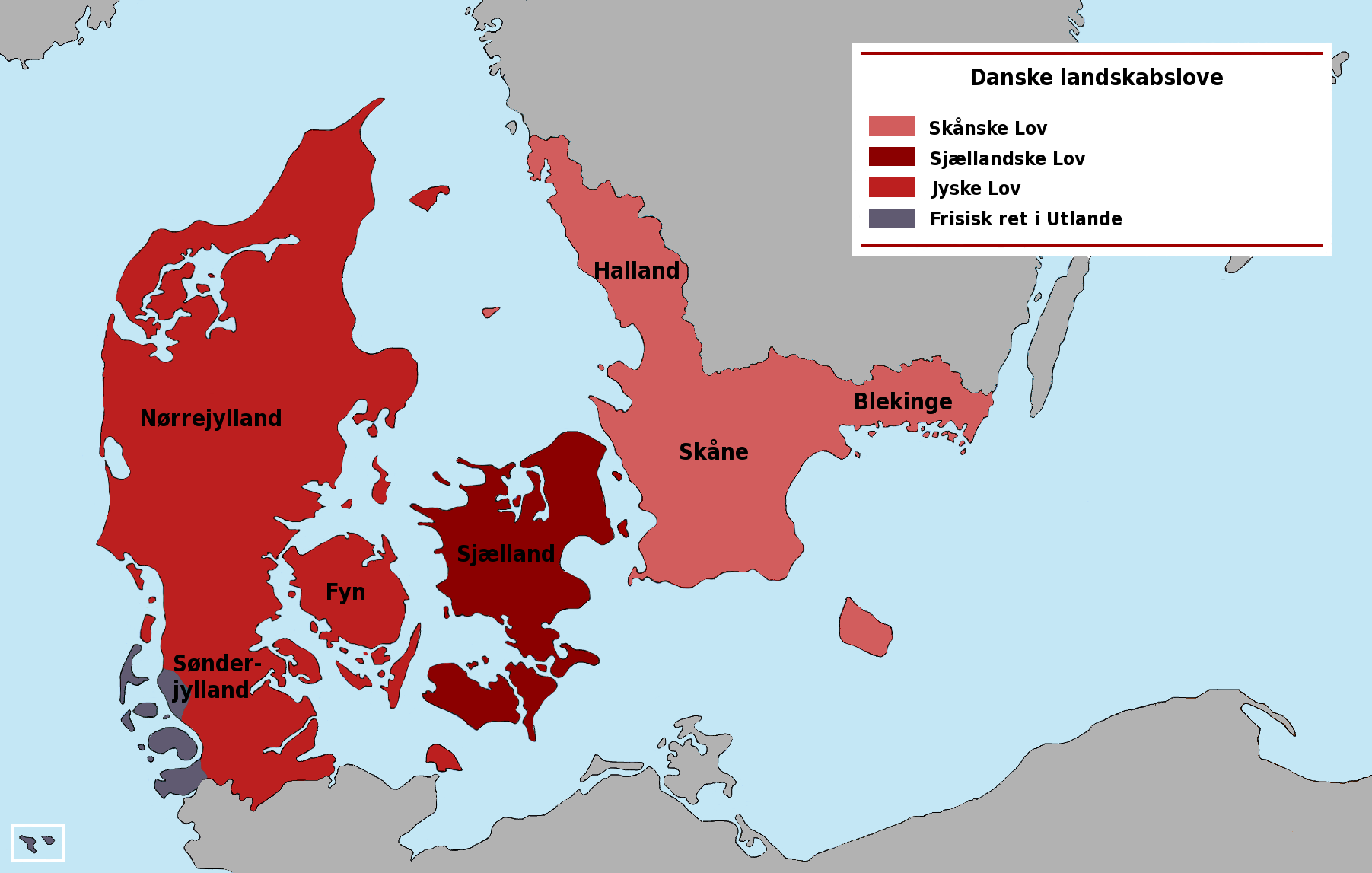
Prior to the adoption of the Danish Code, each landskab had its own legal code, except for the Uthlande (in purple) which followed Frisian Law.

Scanian law (Danish: Skånske Lov, Swedish: Skånelagen) is the oldest Danish provincial law and one of the first Nordic provincial laws to be written down. It was used in the geographic region of Danish Skåneland, which at the time included Scania, Halland, Blekinge and the island of Bornholm. It was also used for a short period on the island of Zealand. According to some scholars, the Scanian Law was first set down between 1202 and 1216, around the same time it was translated into Latin by the Danish Archbishop Anders Sunesøn.

The Scanian law was recorded in several medieval manuscripts, among others the Codex Runicus dated to around 1300, written entirely in medieval runes on parchment. The text of Codex Runicus consists of the Scanian Law and the Scanian Ecclesiastical Law (Skånske Kirkelov), a settlement detailing the administration of justice agreed upon by the Scanians and the archbishop in the late 12th century, as well as a section not related to law, also written in runes, but in another hand.

Denmark ceded Skåneland to Sweden by the Treaty of Roskilde in 1658 (the Treaty of Copenhagen in 1660 gave Bornholm back to Denmark), and from 1683 forward, the Swedish government enforced Swedish customs and laws in the former Danish provinces.

== Manuscripts ==
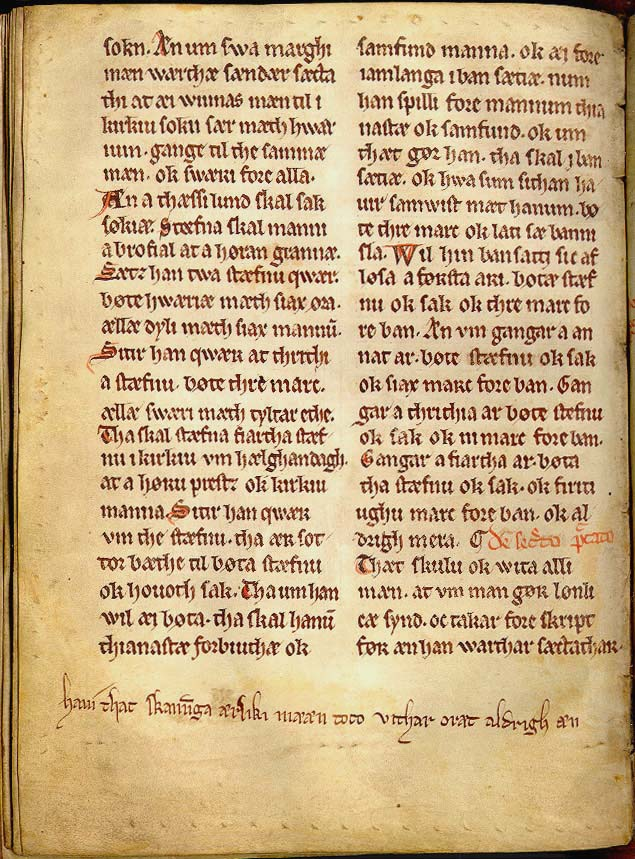
AM 37 4to, Anders Sunesøn's version of the Scanian Law and Scanian Ecclesiastical Law, with the "skåningestrofe" in the bottom margin.

The Scanian Law manuscripts are collections of the customary law practiced in the land. They are records of existing legal codes that addressed issues such as heritage, property rights, use of common land, farming and fishing rights, marriage, murder, rape, vandalism and the role of different authorities. In the oldest version of the law, ordeal by fire is used as evidence, but later Scanian Law manuscripts reflect the influence of the statutory instruments issued under Valdemar II of Denmark shortly after the Fourth Lateran Council of 1215, and trial by ordeal has been abolished.

Besides provisions reflecting older customs, the manuscripts contain law provisions that demonstrate the growing influence of the Crown in Denmark. The different manuscripts are marked by a state of flux in the legal system during and after Valdemar II's reign and sometimes contain conflicting notions of what is considered valid under law. According to some historians, the ideological battle between royalty and local power structures (the things) taking place in the Nordic countries during this time is evident in the Scanian Law manuscripts. Andreas Sunesøn's translation of the Scanian Law uses the word "patria" as an equivalent of "kingdom", which was an uncommon use of the word in Scandinavia at this time. Patria often meant "tingområde", a region united through a common thing (assembly), and according to the Icelandic historian Sverrir Jacobsson, the use of the word to denote "kingdom" was an ideological statement meant to convey that "one should not have other patriae than the kingdom". Jacobsson states that the use of patria in this sense promoted a "royal patriotism with Christian connotations", also supported by Saxo in Gesta Danorum, an ideology that slowly gained acceptance during this era. This royalty-centered ideology was in conflict with the patriotism expressed by the inhabitants of the different Nordic patriae, who instead stressed loyalty primarily to the area of their thing. When a rebellion broke out Scania, with demands that the king hand royal government in the area to local officials rather than to "foreigners" (i.e. non-Scanians), the servant who was ordered to quell the rebellion by Bishop Absalon refused the order, proclaiming a higher duty to his people than to his master. Similar loyalties to the thing area are expressed in Västgötalagen, where people from Sweden and Småland are not considered "natives", and where the law made a difference between "alzmenn" and "ymumenn".

=== Codex Runicus ===
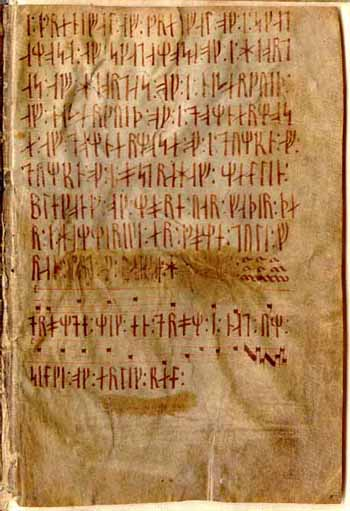
Codex Runicus, a vellum manuscript from c. 1300 written entirely in runes, containing one of the oldest and best preserved texts of the Scanian Law and the oldest musical notation found in Scandinavia.

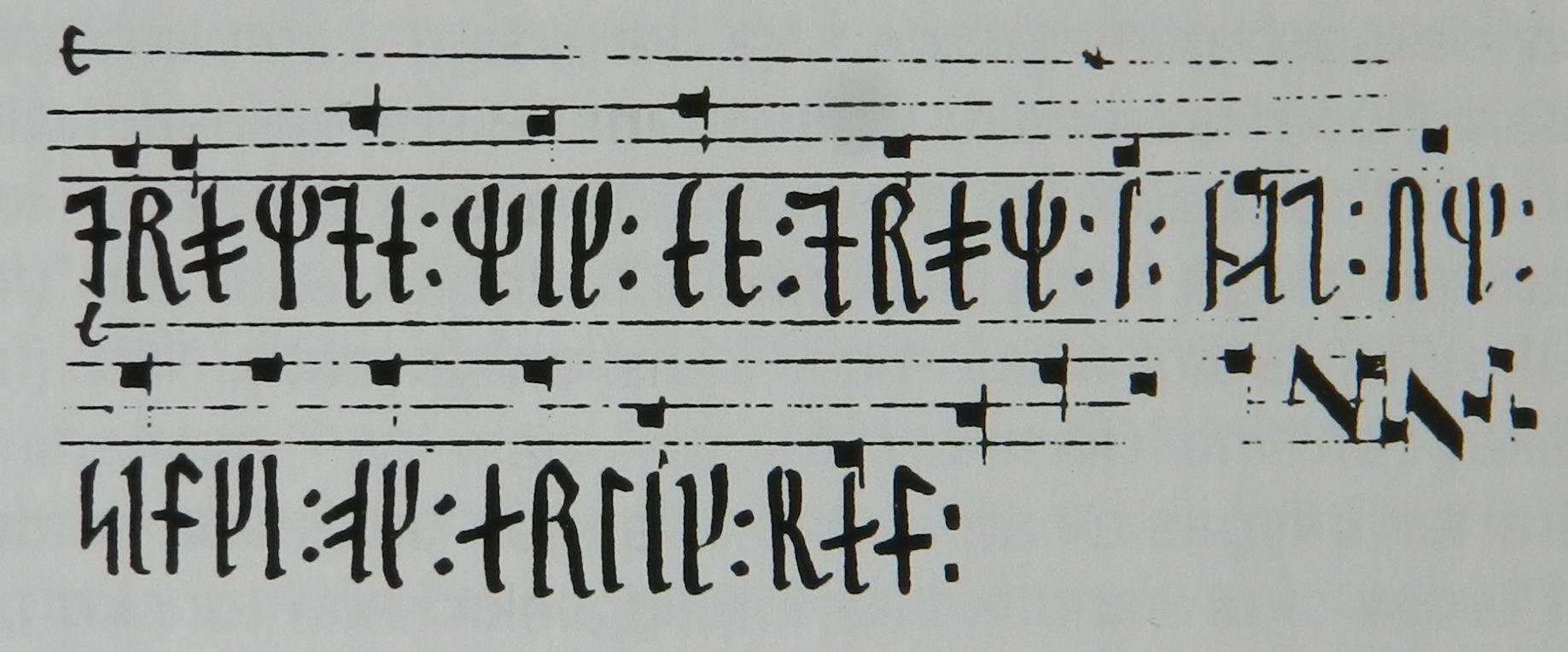
Last phrase of Codex Runicus, which differs from the Latin letter version.

Codex Runicus (AM 28 8vo) is the most famous of several manuscripts from the 13th to 15th centuries containing handwritten copies of the Scanian Law. The second part of the Codex Runicus manuscript consists of two short historical texts: a fragment of a list of Danish kings and a chronicle beginning with the legendary Danish king Hadding's son Frode and ending with Eric VI of Denmark. Following the historical texts is a description of the oldest border between Denmark and Sweden and at the last leaf, the notes and words of the oldest preserved piece of music known in Denmark, a verse with accompanying musical notation on a four-line staff – the first musical notations written in Scandinavia.

=== Latin paraphrase ===
Another well-known manuscript is Anders Sunesøn's 13th-century Latin paraphrase of the Scanian Law (AM 37 4to), created for an international readership. According to linguist Einar Haugen, the Latin paraphrase was a difficult task for the 13th century scribes: "In his desperate efforts to find Latin equivalents for Danish legal terms, the archbishop is driven to insert expressions in Danish, describing them as being so called in materna lingua vulgariter, or natale ydioma, or vulgari nostro, or most often lingua patria." AM 37 4to also contains a vernacular version of the Scanian Ecclesiastical Law, to which it owes much of its claim to fame. In a footnote in the margin of the epilogue to the Scanian Ecclesiastical Law, a second 13th-14th century hand has added a note in the margin known as the Skåningestrofe (the "Scanian Stanza"). The younger Scanian scribe's comment reads:

Hauí that skanunga ærliki mææn toco vithar oræt aldrigh æn.
Let it be known that Scanians are honorable men who have never tolerated injustice.

—

=== Ledreborg manuscript ===
Another version of the Scanian Law is recorded in the composite volume Ledreborg 12 12mo (dated to the 14th century), which contains an adaptation of the Scanian Law for use within the area of Zealandic judicature. Apart from the Scanian Law and the Scanian Ecclesiastical Law, the Ledreborg manuscript has other Scanian legal material: the Scanian version of Eric V of Denmark’s Vordenborg Decree of March 19, 1282 and his Nyborg Decree for Scania of May 26, 1284.

=== Oldest known manuscript ===
The oldest known version of the Scanian Law and the Scanian Ecclesiastical Law can be found in a vellum manuscript from around 1225–1275 (SKB B74 or Cod Holm B74), held at the Swedish Royal Library in Stockholm. The manuscript was continuously revised and edited up until the 16th century. The first leaf of the Scanian Law in SKB B74 is missing and has been replaced with a section written on paper in the 16th century. Apart from the Scanian Law, the manuscript also has 14th and 15th-century fishing right decrees by Margaret I of Denmark and Eric of Pomerania; city privileges for Malmö from 1415, 1446 and 1489; Scanian trading rights established by Christian III of Denmark in 1546; and a medieval maritime law for Visby.

The Scanian Law section in SKB B74 is divided into 234 chapters, and it is the largest and oldest section. Three of the Scanian Law chapters in this manuscript deal with trial by ordeal. In these portions, the script is influenced by Carolingian minuscule, with characteristically rounded shapes. Red, yellow and green palmette ornamented capitals appear in the script. The dating suggested by historians, based on the content, is supported by paleographers and also by linguists. The language in the oldest parts of the manuscript still retained much of the grammatical complexity of Old Norse; nouns, adjectives and pronouns are declined in four grammatical cases, nouns have three grammatical genders and verbs have five grammatical moods.

Leaf 90 of the Scanian Law section in SKB B74 concerns fishing rights and procedures to follow when a farmer has constructed a pond to collect water to run his mill and the pond causes flooding and destruction of other farmers' land. Leaf 91 deals with crimes of passion. The text from the rubric on leaf 91r reads:

"Hittir man
annar man j siango mæth
sinnj athalkunu. oc dræpær bon
dan horkal j siango mæth hænnj.
Tha scal han til things føra. bæthe
bulstær. oc ble mæth twigia man
na vithni. at han drap thæn man
j siango mæth hænnj. oc æy an
nar stad. At swa gøro. læggi han
vtan kirkiu garthe. ofna vgildum
akri. Far horkarl sar j siango
mæth annars mans kunu. oc cum
bær lifuande bort. oc scriftær
sic. oc dør sithan af thy sare. tha
grafuis han j kirkiu garthe. oc
vare tho vgildær fore bondanum."

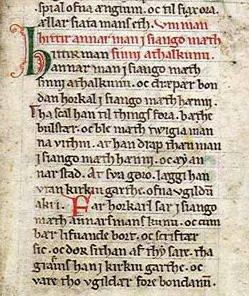
F91r in SKB B74.

Based on a modern Danish translation by Merete K. Jørgensen, the approximate modern English equivalent would be: "If a man finds another man in bed with his wife, and if the farmer kills the fornicator in bed with her, then he shall take the bedding to the thing, along with two men as witness that he killed the man in bed with her and not in another place. When this is done, the man shall be laid outside the churchyard on the ground, and there shall be no fine for him. If the fornicator is wounded in bed with another man's wife and if he survives, makes a confession to a priest and gets absolution, but later dies from the wounds, then he shall be buried in the churchyard and the farmer shall pay no fine for him."

=== Sweden ===
Another medieval Scanian manuscript housed in Stockholm is SKB B69 4to from around 1325, with a version of the Scanian Law likely written by a scribe from Malmö, according to Danish linguist Britta Olrik Frederiksen. The manuscript's Malmö connection has been postulated "to explain a number of linguistically eccentric passages".

A third early version of the Scanian Law exists in SKB B76 4to, also housed in Stockholm, estimated to have been written in 1325. It contains parts of an early version of the Scanian Law and the Scanian Ecclesiastical Law, thought to be close to the first recorded versions from the late 12th century or early 13th century which have not been preserved. SKB B76 4to is locally referred to as the "Hadorphian manuscript", after the 17th-century Swedish scholar Johan Hadorph (1630–93), a colleague of Olof Rudbeck's at Uppsala University, who edited the manuscript in 1676. Johan Hadorph, along with Olaus Verelius (1618–82), the leaders of the Swedish Hyperborean movement, were in charge of the Swedish Academy of Antiquities at Uppsala University, instituted by Count Magnus Gabriel de la Gardie. Some of the manuscripts edited at the Swedish Academy of Antiquities were bought from the widow of late Danish professor Stephanius in 1652 and others were war booty from the war of 1658. Along with Poland, Germany and the Baltic States, Denmark was the country hardest hit by Swedish depredations undertaken to bring literature to Sweden during the 17th century wars, at a time when the country "did not have money to spend on new acquisitions and had limited access to newly published literature", according to the Swedish Royal Library. In the article "War booty as a method of acquisition", the library states that the "war-booty came as a substantial increment to the newly established university library", although it was Bohemia and Moravia that were "robbed of perhaps the most exacting prizes". Swedish authorities have so far denied the majority of requests for restitution made by other countries. Representatives for the Swedish Royal Library argue that "restitution of former war booty would engender chaos, with ambiguous legal consequences" and state that the library will instead "take the best possible care of the objects in question and make them available to the public as these are now part of our common cultural heritage."

The library thus holds large collections of medieval manuscripts from other countries and regions, including the largest collection of Icelandic manuscripts outside Iceland. Also part of the collection is the oldest known manuscript of the Law Code of Jutland (Jyske Lov), Cod Holm C 37, dated to around 1280. As an alternative to repatriation, the director of the Swedish Royal Library agreed to digitize this and some other manuscripts (including Codex Gigas). The Danish Royal Library in Copenhagen has set up a website to display the digital facsimile of the Jutland law code and the Internet thus provides a form of "digital repatriation of cultural heritage" according to Ivan Boserup, Keeper of Manuscripts and Rare Books, The Royal Library, Copenhagen. However, the medieval Scanian manuscripts held at the Royal Library of Sweden are not part of the cultural heritage offered for public view in digitized versions.

Digital files of a 15th-century version of the Scanian Law is provided by the project Medieval Manuscripts at Lund University Library - Preservation and Access at the St. Laurentius Digital Manuscript Library, Lund University, Scania.

== Context ==
A number of medieval Scandinavian provincial and national law collections have been preserved. A nearly intact manuscript of the Norwegian Gulating Law has been preserved in Codex Rantzovianus (137 4to) from around 1250, and three older fragments of this law (AM 315e folio, AM 315f folio and NRA 1 B) have been dated to the period between 1200 and 1250 by some scholars and to as early as 1180 by others. Grágás (Grey Goose), the oldest Icelandic law code, is preserved in two vellum manuscripts written shortly after 1250.

Like the Icelandic law code, the Scanian Law was not put into writing on the initiative of a king. Scania had its own thing or parliament, as well as regional parliaments within the land. The dates cited below are the dates of the oldest verifiable extant copy of some Danish, Norwegian and Swedish law codes; various laws have been asserted to be older and thing-derived provincial laws clearly predate these recorded laws. In the timeline below, blue bars denote provincial laws while pink bars denote national laws.

== See also ==
- Medieval Scandinavian laws
- Westrogothic provincial law

=== External links ===
- Illumination(s) in The Law of Scania, KB B 74, ALVIN
