= Bornholm uprising =

1658 Danish revolt on Bornholm

- Part of the Dano-Swedish War (1658–1660)
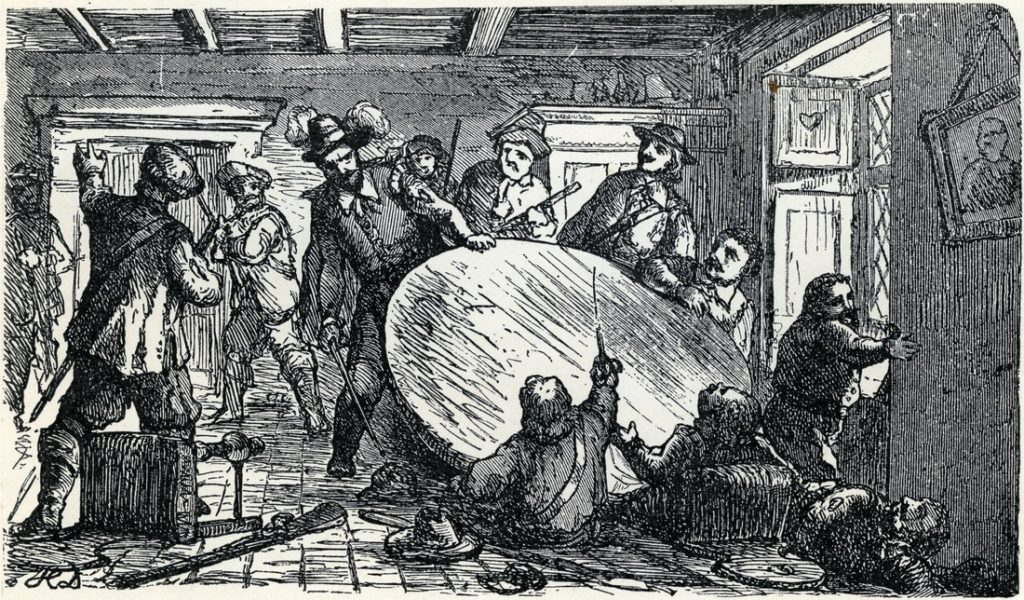
- Assassination of Johan Printzensköld, retrieved from Rønne City Archive
| Date | 8–9 December 1658 |
| Location | Bornholm, (present-day Denmark) 55°8′N 14°55′E |
| Result | Danish victory |
| Territorial changes | Bornholm ceded to Denmark |

Belligerents
| (Denmark–Norway) Bornholmer rebels | (yes) Swedish Empire |

Commanders and leaders
| (Denmark–Norway) Poul Ancher (Denmark–Norway) Jens Kofoed (Denmark–Norway) Peder Olsen (Denmark–Norway) Villum Clausen (Denmark–Norway) Klavs Kam | (Swedish Empire) Johan Printzensköld X (Swedish Empire) Karl Berg (POW) (Swedish Empire) Nils Bud (POW) (Swedish Empire) Per Lagman (surrendered) (Swedish Empire) Nils Holm (POW) |

Units involved
| (Denmark–Norway) Bornholm militia (Denmark–Norway) Burgher-Company | (Swedish Empire) Bornholm regiment (Swedish Empire) Spes |

Strength
| Unknown | 120 men (Note: Of which 100 were privates, with 5 casualties within the first two months of their deployment); 80 cavalry (Note: All of which arrived after the initial Swedish surrender); 4 cannons |

Casualties and losses
| None | 10 killed c. 190 captured |

The Bornholm uprising (Danish: Den bornholmske opstand, Swedish: Upproret på Bornholm), also known as the Bornholm revolt, was a popular uprising against the newly established Swedish presence on the island of Bornholm.

After the decisive Dano-Swedish War of 1657–1658, Skåneland, including Bornholm, was ceded to the Swedish Empire in the Treaty of Roskilde. However, increased taxes and conscription by the new Swedish governor, Johan Printzensköld, led to major discontent with the local inhabitants. The unrest culminated in the assassination of Governor Printzensköld, followed by the collapse of Swedish forces on the Island.

== Background ==
Bornholm, along with the rest of Skåneland, was ceded by Denmark–Norway to the Swedish Empire on 8 March 1658 in the Peace of Roskilde, following the disastrous Dano-Swedish War. The news reached Bornholm on 20 April and the first church service for the Swedish king, Charles X Gustav, was held the following Sunday.

The Swedish government chose the experienced and energetic Johan Printzensköld as the Island's new governor (Landshøvding), who would reach Sandvig on 29 April. With Printzensköld were 120–130 troops, of which 100 were privates, four cannons, and 40 centners of gunpowder in addition to other ammunition.

Printzensköld's first gubernatorial act was to gather the Island's officials and people from town and countryside to get an image of the Island's conditions, as requested by the Swedish government. During the gathering, the Bornholmers braggingly brought Printzensköld to write about them:

[The island] is endowed with an exceptionally good and fertile soil, such that it has been regarded as the finest land, both by its own inhabitants and by others, that has belonged to the Kingdom of Denmark.

— Johan Printzensköld

At the gathering, the inhabitants raised multiple concerns and requests to Printzensköld, which he paid attention to. Despite this, Printzensköld met quick clear discontent with the majority of Bornholmers, which caused him to think they were malicious and rude. This popular discontent would only grow following the Swedish exploitation of the Island's manpower, goods, and money. Notwithstanding the inhabitants' hatred for him, Printzensköld sought to mitigate the demands of the Swedish government on the Island.

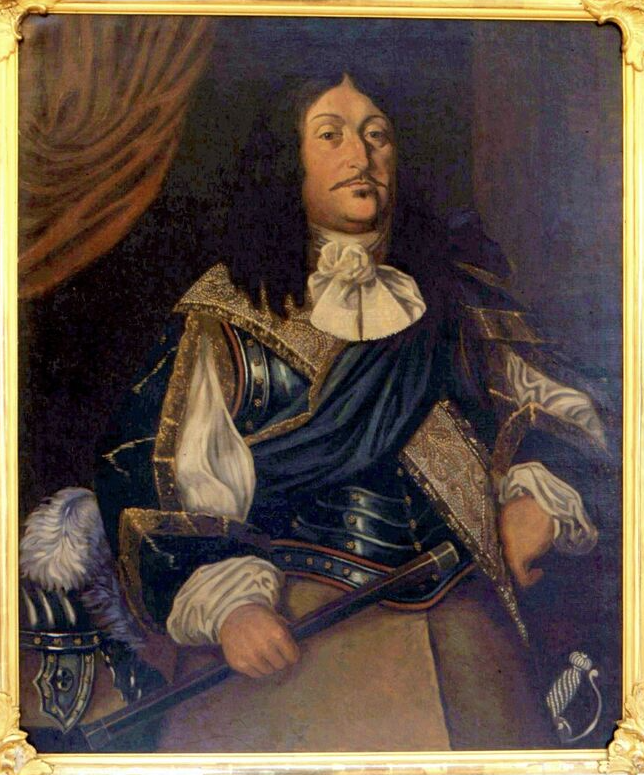
Colonel Johan Printzensköld, painted in 1899 by Carl Printzensköld, as a copy from a 1649 painting

== Prelude ==
The popular unrest substantially rose when the Swedish government conscripted the Island's youth to service in Pomerania. The Bornholmers argued against this by citing the Treaty of Roskilde, which stated that Bornholm should use its old laws and statutes, in which the Island's militia had previously only been used for its own defense. (Note: This claim is, however, false, as Frederick III had ordered 400 soldiers to be recruited from the Island for military service in Rügen in 1657.)

Charles X Gustav ordered on 4 June half of the militia's 682 men to be shipped to Pomerania. Subsequently, 350 men under Gustav Horn were shipped from Rønne to Stettin on 7 July to serve in the Swedish Army. The conscription drained the Island's manpower, despite being less than the Danish conscription the previous year, and led Printzensköld to urge Charles X Gustav not to conscript the Island in the foreseeable future. Charles X Gustav also ordered cavalrymen from Bornholm to be sent to Riga for incorporation into a Swedish regiment. On 8 October 1658, Printzensköld shipped 45 cavalrymen from the island. Separately, on 7 November, he dispatched 40 sailors via Ystad to Helsingborg, under the command of his deputy, Captain Nils Holm.

Concerning taxation, Printzensköld required the Island's ordinary taxes with strictness, and they do not appear to be collected in any greater amount than what the Danish government collected previously. However, at the beginning of November, the Swedish government imposed an extraordinary tax on the peasantry, in which each land-owning peasant was to pay 16 riksdaler in silver coin. Despite the earlier writings of Danish historians, who wrote about a series of new taxations under Printzensköld, there is no evidence of additional taxes, and the Danish historians are likely to have exaggerated. Nonetheless, the drainage of Bornholm's resources brought Printzensköld to plee Charles X Gustav to spare the island from further levies:

I could by no means have imagined that the island would be so devoid of resources and money as it is, and I doubt that the common people can pay the first installment in cash, but only in goods.

— Johan Printzensköld

=== Renewed warfare ===
On 7 August 1658, Charles X Gustav landed in Korsør to eliminate the remnants of the Danish state. When the news reached Bornholm, it must have raised the thought of rebellion among the Danish-minded (Dansksindede) Bornholmers. Subsequently, a conspiracy between Rønne and Hasle was formed, which exchanged letters with Frederick III of Denmark. King Frederick III encouraged the Bornholmers to liberate themselves and urged them to destroy the Swedish garrison on Hammershus, which caused the conspiracy to spread among the inhabitants. According to M. K. Zarhtmann, the conspiracy's leader was Poul Hansen Ancher, who was a priest in Hasle and Rutsker Parish and deeply popular in Bornholm. However, it had previously been unanimously agreed that Jens Pedersen Kofoed was the leader. In addition to having connections to citizens in Rønne and Priests throughout the Island, members of the conspiracy included Peder Olsen, Villum Clausen, and Niels Gumløse.

Just before the outbreak of a rebellion, the Swedish military on the Island was in a bad situation. At the start of the winter, only 60–70 of Printzensköld's initial 100 privates were in armed conditions, because of the lack of resources and harsh winter. Furthermore, the Island's only fortification, Hammershus, was in such bad shape that Printzensköld had to repair its wall with turf due to a lack of anything else. On 13 August, Printzensköld demanded reinforcements from the Swedish government, when he feared the possibility of a Dano-Dutch naval attack on the Island. In relation to that, Printzensköld asked for 30 or 40 cavalrymen to guard the Island's coasts, however, his request was fulfilled by Charles X Gustav. As Printzensköld feared, a combined Dano-Dutch fleet appeared under Bornholm on 14 November, and Printzensköld hastily observed its movements. Until then, external threats remained Printzensköld's main priority, while internal unrest, like the ongoing Danish-minded conspiracy, seemed, by the start of November, unthinkable for him. However, in his letter to the Swedish king of 18 November, Printzensköld seemed to be aware of the Bornholmer's resilience.

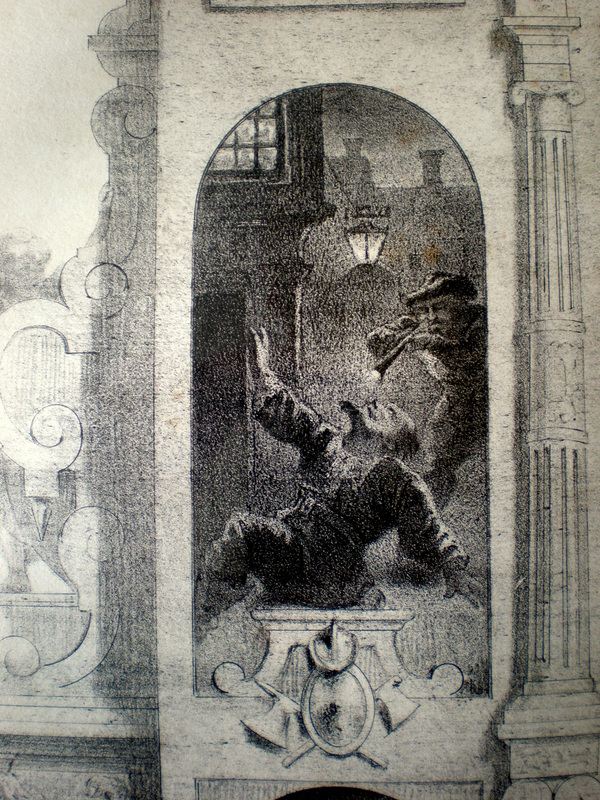
"The Shot" - the murder of Printzensköld, from Rønne City Archive, c. 1900

== Uprising ==
On 8 December 1658, Printzenskold went to Rønne to have a vessel sent to Ystad for the requested reinforcements. On the way, Printzensköld stopped at Hasle to demand the mayor pay the city's remaining taxes. From here, one of the conspirators, Jens Pederson Kofoed, secretly followed Printzensköld to Rønne. In spite of getting no support from the priests Poul Hansen Ancher and Jakob Tresløv, Kofoed got support from some conspirators in Hasle and Rønne.

=== Assassination of Printzensköld ===
Meanwhile, Printzensköld arrived in Rønne at 4:00 p.m. and took a visit to one of the city's two mayors. When Kofoed and the conspirators got word of this, they quickly came to the mayor's house and pushed into the room living room. It came to a violent incident, during which the table was overturned onto Printzensköld, and his body was, under Kofoed's leadership, dragged out into the street by the conspirators. Subsequently, they took him towards the town hall's cellar, in which Villum Clausen fired a pistol shot at his head, after which both Jens Kofoed and Niels Gumløs each fired a shot at him.

There are historical uncertainties revolving around the event, including whether or not Printzensköld was captured and whether he tried to flee. The Borringholms Manifest, a manifesto published right after Printzensköld's death to defend the Bornholmers' actions, and a Swedish witness both agree that Printzensköld was captured. However, they disagree with Printzensköld's supposed escape attempt, with the Borringholms Manifest saying he tried to escape, while the Swedish witness opposes this. Despite a later source from 1720 agreeing with the Borringholms Manifest, both sources' historic reliability is slim, and no other contemporary source supports their assessment. According to M. K. Zarhtmann, no escape attempt was made on Printzensköld's part, yet all other authors characterize Printzensköld's escape attempt as the real cause of the murder.

=== Solidification of the island ===
The news of Printzensköld's death quickly spread through Rønne and subsequently, the rest of the island, which forced the conspiracy into open action. After the event, Kofoed and his companions hunted down Printzensköld's servants and other Swedes, who were staying in Rønne. After the conspirators had captured the Swedes, they rode up to Jakob Tresløv in Nyker and sent word to the villages of Vestermarie and Klemensker to send armed commoners to Ruth's Church in Rutsker. Hereafter, the conspirators rode to Poul Ancher in Hasle to recall the recent events for him. It was agreed that all the commoners were to be gathered at Ruth's Church.

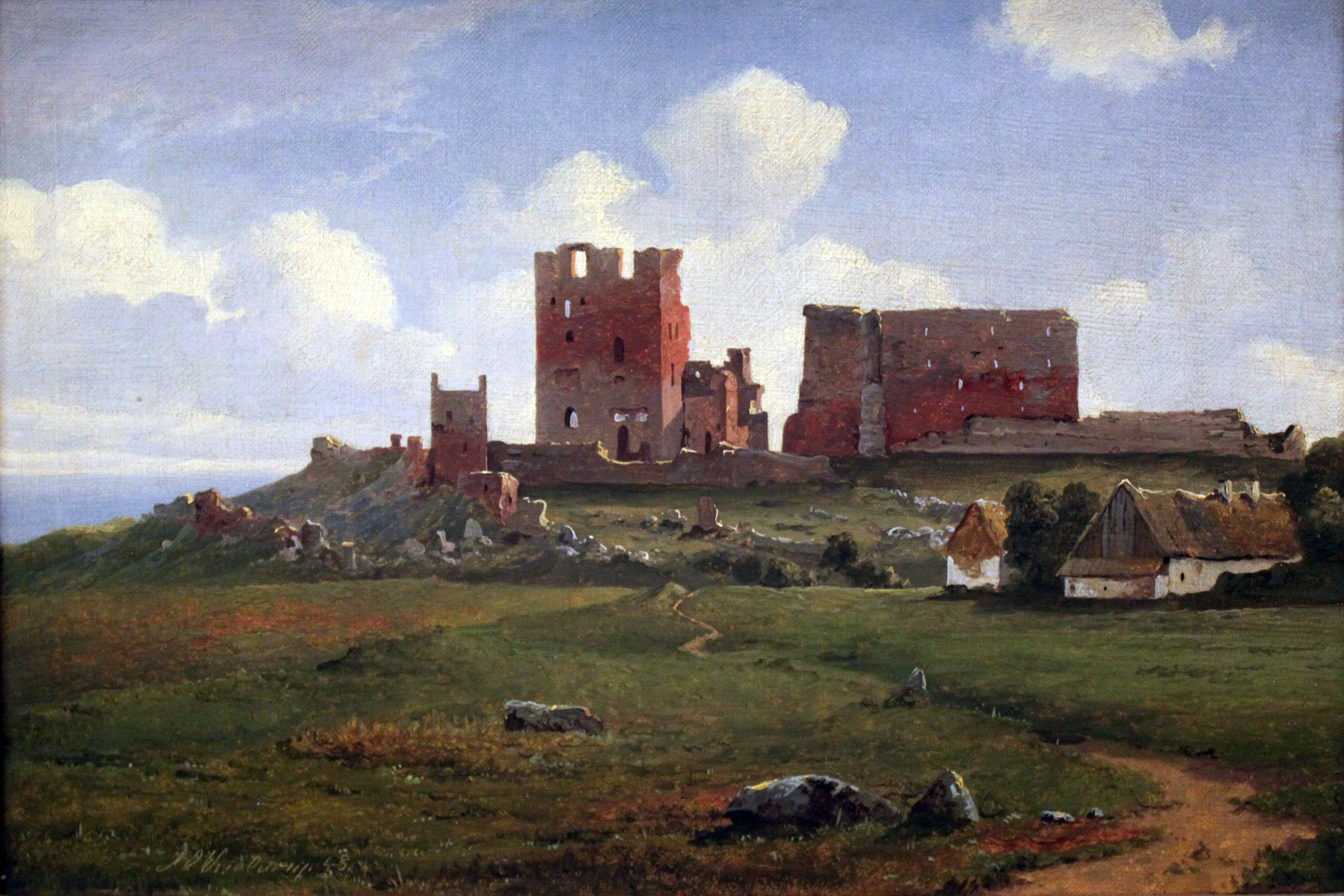
Ruins of Hammershus by Anton Eduard Kieldrup, 1848

From here, Kofoed rode to Rutsker Parish's sandemand (parish executive officer) Mads Høg, where they unexpectedly met a Swedish lieutenant named Nils Rud, who quickly got captured. The other conspirators rode to Sandvig and gathered the commoners to mobilize them. Hereafter, Kofoed rode to Allinge, where he spotted a Swedish quartermaster, who got killed after refusing to surrender. Allinge's citizens got information about the governor's death, and all armed men followed Kofoed and the whole rebellion's army to Hammershus fortress.

The conspirators besieged the fortress and ensured the Swedes could not escape it. During the night between 8 and 9 December, the rest of the rebel forces reached Hammershus led by Captain Niels Gumløse and accompanied by Peder Olsen and Poul Ancher. Discussions on how to best persuade the garrison at Hammershus to surrender now began, and it was soon agreed to send a letter to the Swedish commander, Per Lagman, urging him to surrender. According to the aforementioned Swedish witness, Rønne's captain, Claus Kam, wore Printzensköld's clothes and rode on his horse outside the fortress to intimidate the Swedes. The Danes falsely told the Swedes that Printzensköld was captured and that they would send his head if the garrison did not surrender. This trick worked, and the garrison surrendered without a fight. Per Lagman met with the leaders of the rebellion to write an instrument of surrender, and soon after the Swedish garrison left their weapons and became prisoners of war.

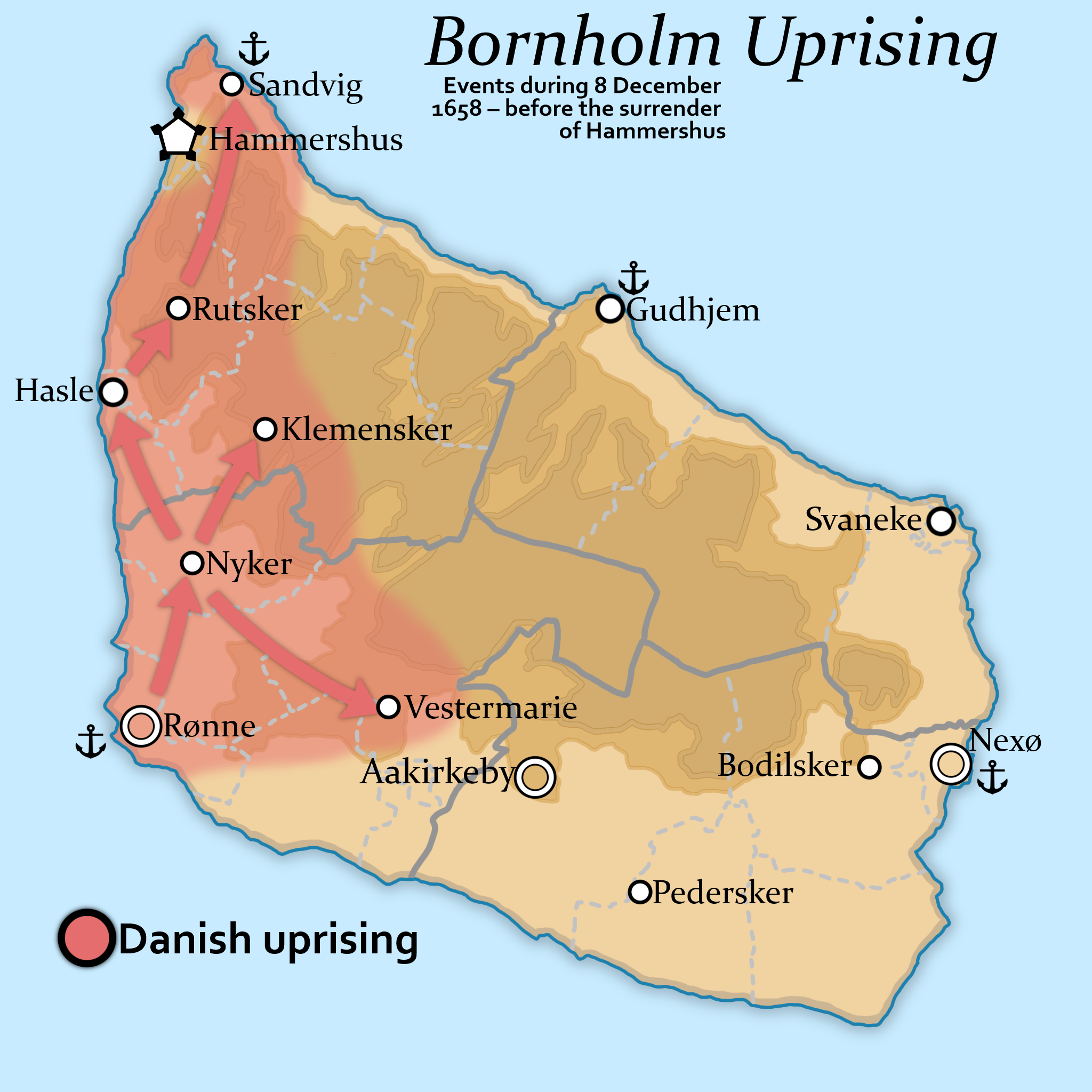
The movements of the revolt from Printzensköld's death to the surrender of Hammershus, 8 December 1658.

== Aftermath ==
The rebellion succeeded in the span of 24 hours, and the Swedish regiment was dismantled. The Bornholmers' militia now occupied Hammershus with a garrison commanded by Kofoed, who had some military experience as a cavalryman. Meanwhile, the Swedish prisoners were scattered around the Island to work on farms for food. Claus Kam from Rønne was appointed as a de facto temporary governor of the Island and took the lead in the island's administration. At the same time, Poul Ancher was active everywhere with advice and overseeing the guards around the island.

However, the fear of a Swedish attack from the sea was not unthinkable, and on 27 December a Swedish galiot, Spes, arrived outside Sandvig. It brought Printzensköld’s deputy, Captain Nils Holm back from Scania with Printzensköld's long-awaited reinforcements of 80 cavalrymen. Kofoed successfully lured the Swedes into land in small groups, sending some to Rønne to be imprisoned.

Meanwhile, Mayor Peder Olsen sailed to Copenhagen to formally give over Bornholm to King Frederick III. On 21 December, after one day's sail, he reached the besieged Copenhagen and on 29 December Bornholm's representatives handed the reclaimed island back to King Frederik III. In the King's letter of takeover, the Bornholmers were promised: "such privileges and concessions, both regarding conscription, taxes, and in other ways that could seek the best and prosperity of the land." With this assurance, Olsen returned to Bornholm, and in early January 1659, 160 Danish troops arrived at Hammershus under the command of Colonel Mikael Eckstein, who took over the island's administration.

The Swedish government received the news about the events in Bornholm late. With the only knowledge that Bornholm had revolted, Charles X Gustav sent a letter to Printzensköld on 5 January, allowing him to transfer all the troops he needed from Pomerania to the island. It was not until 13 February that the Swedish government got a detailed description of the events from some Swedes who managed to escape the island. The only serious Swedish attempt to retake the island occurred on 4 July, when a Swedish expeditionary force tried to disembark in Allinge. Mikael Eckstein successfully repulsed the invasion, despite getting his horse shot.

As a reward, the leaders of the uprising were each granted estates and rights by King Frederick III. Paul Ancher got patronage to Aa Church, Peder Olsen, who had been accused of treason in 1645, was appointed as judge on the island, and Jens Kofoed got pardoned for previous crimes. Villum Clausen, who shot Printzensköld, and Hans Lavridsen both received farm estates for life, while Peder Jensen became ridefoged (bailiff).

At the conclusion of peace in Copenhagen, on 27 May 1660, it was decided that Bornholm would remain under Denmark in exchange for compensation to the Swedish crown in Scanian estates. However, if no agreement was reached on this matter, the island would be returned to Sweden. During Hannibal Sehested's subsequent negotiations in Stockholm, the amount of compensation was set to 8,500 thalers of land value, securing Bornholm's allegiance to Denmark. Hereby, Bornholm became the first hereditary land of Frederick III, two years before the King's Law.

== In popular culture ==
In 1908, a memorial stone was erected on the streets of Hasle because of the town's central role in the uprising. The leaders of the uprising achieved a heroic status on the island, with ferries being named after them. A 350-year jubilee was held in 2008, with Bornholm Museum making a special exhibition called "Plague, pistols and Printzensköld." Additionally the then-prime minister of Denmark, Anders Fogh Rasmussen, held a speech praising the Bornholmers' resistance and thanking the revolt's leaders. Furthermore, festivals were held in Aa church, Hasle, and Rutsker. Since the jubilee, it has become a tradition to celebrate the liberation every year.

== See also ==
- Landing at Bornholm – 1945 Soviet operation in Denmark in WWII
- Siege of Trondheim – Dano-Norwegian siege of Trondheim in 1658
- Skåneland – Region in Southern Scandinavia
- Flag of Bornholm – Unofficial flag of the Danish island of Bornholm

== Works cited ==
- Zahrtmann, M. K. (1897). Svenskerne paa Bornholm 1658 [The Swedes on Bornholm 1658] (PDF) (in Danish). Historisk Tidsskrift.
- Jørgensen, J. A [in Danish] (1900). Bornholms Historie [History of Bornholm] (PDF) (in Danish). Rønne: forlagt af Frits Sørensens Boghandel.
- Isacsson, Claes-Göran [in Swedish] (2015). Karl X Gustavs krig: Fälttågen i Polen, Tyskland, Baltikum, Danmark och Sverige 1655-1660 [Wars of Charles X Gustav: The campaigns in Poland, Germany, the Baltics, Denmark and Sweden 1655-1660] (in Swedish). Historiska Media. ISBN 9789175450117.
- Adolfsson, Mats (2007). Fogdemakt och bondevrede: 1500-1718 [Bailiff power and peasant rage: 1500-1718] (in Swedish). Natur & Kultur. p. 0. ISBN 9789127026322.
- Kofod, Dennis (2021). Bornholm: Steder og mennesker [Bornholm: Places and people] (in Danish). Gyldendal. ISBN 978-87-02-32931-5.
