= Adolph Peter Adler =

Theologian, writer and pastor (1812–1869)

- Born: 29 August 1812; Copenhagen
- Died: 5 October 1869 (aged 57); Copenhagen

Philosophical work
- Main interests: Theology

Adolph Peter Adler (29 August 1812 – 5 October 1869), was a Danish theologian, writer and a pastor in Hasle and Rutsker, on the island of Bornholm, Denmark.

== Early life ==
Adler was born in Copenhagen on 29 August 1812, to well-to-do Danish merchant and wholesaler Niels Adler (1785–1871). When Adler was 8, he went to Copenhagen's most prestigious private school, Borgerdydskolen (School of Civic Virtue), whose headmaster was the legendary Michael Nielsen (1776–1846). Frederik Ludvig Liebenberg (1810–94) recounts in his memoirs that Adler and Kierkegaard were in the same class together from 1823 to 1827 often addressing each other with the informal "du" form, implying a close and informal friendship.

He began his studies at the University of Copenhagen in 1831 and a year later begin work on his major, theology. After 4 years of studying he became a theological candidate in 1836. Adler writes in the dissertation: from the moment that the creature stepped forth out of the unity with the Creator, subjectivity also stepped forth out of unity with objectivity.

He left Copenhagen in 1837 to travel abroad for a year and a half. Upon his return he became inspired by Hans Lassen Martensen's (1808–84) lectures on Hegelianism, along with many of his fellow University of Copenhagen, theological students.

== Career ==
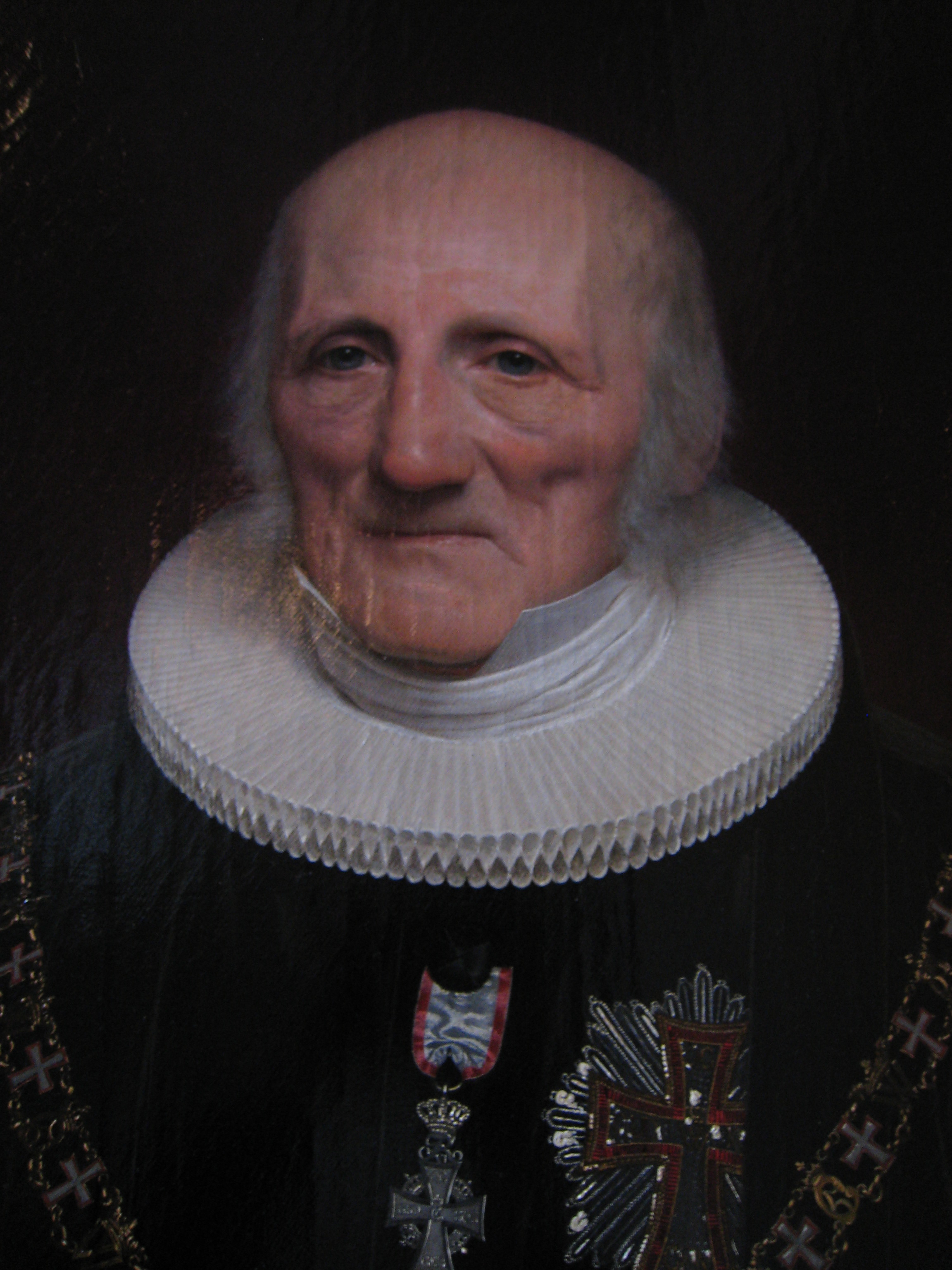
Bishop Jacob Peter Mynster, who suspended Adler in 1844.

Adler became an avid and prominent representative of the young Danish Hegelians and took a pastorate in 1841. He claimed to have had a "vision of light" in 1842, which turned him against Hegelianism. In this vision, Jesus commanded him to burn his former books and stated that he would dictate to him a new work. This book, entitled Several Sermons (Nogle Prædikener), and was published in 1843. He wrote later in his "preface" to a collection of sermons published in 1843, that he realized as if in a flash that everything depended not upon thought but upon spirit, and that an evil spirit existed. and he continued:

That same night a hideous sound descended into our room. then the Savior commanded me to get up and go in and write down these words: The first human beings could have had an eternal life, because when thought joins God's spirit with the body, then life is eternal; when the human being joins God's spirit with the body, then the human being is God's child; Adam would thus have been God's son. But they sinned. Thought immersed itself in itself without the world, without the body. It separated the spirit from the body, the spirit from the world. And when the human being himself, when thought itself separates the spirit from the body and the spirit from the world, the human being must die and the world and the body must become evil. And what becomes of the spirit? The spirit leaves the body. But God does not take it back. And it becomes his enemy. And where does it go? Back into the world. Why? It is angry with the world, which abandoned it. It is the evil spirit. And the world itself created the evil spirit. Then Jesus commanded me to burn my own works and in the future to keep to the Bible.

Bishop Jacob Peter Mynster suspended him in 1844 and Adler was then deposed in 1845. He later conceded that his revelation was a mistake, that "revelation was perhaps too strong an expression". To make matters much worse, Adler later published other works and declared that his former "revelation" was instead a work of genius. Moreover, Kierkegaard met with Adler, who, while reading his own works to Kierkegaard, would alternate between a regular speaking voice and a shrill "whistling" voice, as if the latter were to convey weightier and more spiritual truths. It was clear that the man was deranged. However, beyond the mere fact of his delusions, Kierkegaard was impressed by the issues that the case of Adler raised, particularly Adler's confusion over the categories of genius and inspiration. Kierkegaard's interest in Adler led him to write The Book on Adler, which was published posthumously in 1872.

== Sources ==
- Stewart, Jon Bartley (2009). Kierkegaard and His Danish Contemporaries – Theology. Vol. 7 (2 ed.). Søren Kierkegaard Research Centre, University of Copenhagen, Denmark: Ashgate Pub Co. ISBN 978-0-7546-6873-2. Archived from the original on 6 November 2013.
- Lund, Holger (1887). Borgerdydsskolen i Kjøbenhavn 1787–1887 (in Danish). Copenhagen: Wroblewsky. pp. 124–251.
- Liebenberg, F. L. (1894). Nogle Optegnelser om mit Levned (in Danish). Copenhagen: Gyldendal. p. 11.
- Adler, Adolf Peter (1840). Den isolerede Subjectivitet i dens vigtigste Skikkelser (in Danish). Copenhagen: Berlingske. p. 20.
- Adler, Adolf Peter (1842). Populaire Foredrag over Hegels objective Logik (in Danish). Copenhagen: C. A. Reitzel.
- Adler, Adolf Peter (1843). "Preface. BA, supplement". Nogle Prædikener (in Danish). Copenhagen: C. A. Reitzel. pp. 339–40.
- Kierkegaard, Søren (2008). Howard V. Hong, Edna H. Hong (ed.). Kierkegaard's Writings, XXIV: The Book on Adler (PDF). Princeton University Press. pp. Historical Introduction.
