= Treaty of Copenhagen (1660) =

1660 peace treaty to end the Second Northern War

- Type: Bilateral treaty
- Signed: 27 May 1660
- Location: Copenhagen, Denmark
- Original signatories: Denmark–Norway; Sweden
- Ratifiers: Denmark–Norway; Sweden

The Treaty of Copenhagen (Danish: Freden i København, Swedish: Freden i Köpenhamn) was signed on 27 May 1660, and marked the conclusion of the Second Northern War between the Swedish Empire and the alliance of Denmark–Norway and the Polish–Lithuanian Commonwealth. This treaty was a smaller follow-up treaty to that of the Treaty of Roskilde, which decisively delineated the mutually recognized boundaries of Denmark, Sweden, and Norway; boundaries which are almost exactly the same to this day.

== Opening positions ==
Charles X of Sweden would not accept any other outcome than Sweden's receipt of Akershus county, in exchange for the return of Trøndelag and Bornholm to Denmark–Norway; Frederick III of Denmark on the other hand refused to abide by the terms of the Treaty of Roskilde, instead wanting to revert to the conditions of the Second Treaty of Brömsebro (1645). Both kings were stubborn, and had to depend on the mediating powers, France and England on the Swedish side, and the Dutch Republic on the Danish side, to bring about a treaty.

Frederick argued to his Dutch allies that Swedish control of Scania would present an eternal lingering threat to Copenhagen, and proposed a Danish-Dutch alliance to retake Scania. Frederick had the support of Brandenburg and Austria, but the Dutch had already agreed with England that preventing the western and eastern shore of Øresund from being controlled by the same country would in turn prevent future increases in the Øresund toll, which would cause disruption in the Dutch and English Baltic trade. In addition, Cardinal Jules Mazarin threatened a French invasion of the Netherlands if it were to assist Denmark against Sweden.

When learning of Charles' death in February 1660, Frederick immediately proclaimed the Treaty of Roskilde null and void. This caused great alarm to the Swedish mediators, but their French and English counterparts assured them that if Sweden were to yield their claim to Trøndelag but otherwise stick by the terms of Roskilde, France and England would assure a treaty under those conditions. Denmark insisted on the return of the Scanian lands, with the support of Brandenburg, Austria and Poland, but this time the Dutch did not agree with Denmark. On 8 March 1660, admiral Michiel de Ruyter and his Dutch fleet were ordered to leave the harbour of Landskrona, where he had bottled up the Swedish fleet. Frederick yielded, and the negotiations began in earnest on 24 March.

== Negotiations ==
The most contentious point was regarding the control of the island of Bornholm. The people of Bornholm had risen against their Swedish occupants and killed the Swedish commander, Johan Printzensköld. They now feared retribution, were the island to remain in Swedish hands. Frederick had given his word of honour to protect his faithful subjects to the utmost; he kept his promise by demanding the return of Bornholm to Denmark despite the threats of Sweden and the negotiating powers. It was then suggested that Denmark would provide compensation by ceding several estates held by Danish noble families in Scania to the crown of Sweden.

At this point, however, the negotiations started to derail as the mediating countries' representatives became involved in intrigues that weren't in the interests of their client states. Exasperated by the slow progress of the negotiations, Hannibal Sehested suggested that negotiations should proceed directly between Denmark and Sweden. The suggestion was accepted by the Swedes, and in a few days the conditions of the treaty were agreed upon.

== Terms ==
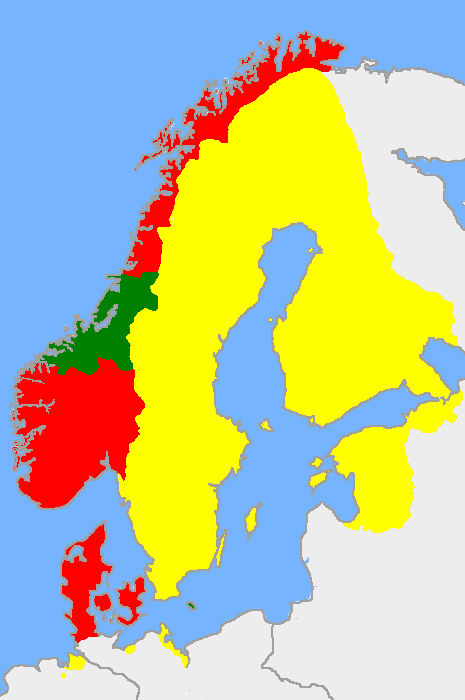
Sweden in yellow, Denmark–Norway in red. Sweden had to return Trøndelag and Bornholm to Denmark–Norway. Ceded areas in green.

On 27 May, the treaty was signed in the tents that had been erected halfway between Copenhagen and the fortified Swedish camp of Carlstad. Four days later the remnants of the Swedish army in Zealand, now numbering 3,000, finally began leaving the outskirts of Copenhagen.

The terms of the treaty were as follows:

- Sweden kept the territories east of the Sound, including the island of Ven, Scania, Halland, Blekinge, Bohuslän.
- Sweden was exempted from the Sound Dues.
- Trøndelag, then including Nordmøre and Romsdal, was returned to Norway and Bornholm to Denmark.
- All Danish and Norwegian fortifications captured by Sweden, excepting fortifications in provinces ceded to Sweden, were to be evacuated within a fortnight after the ratifications of the treaty had been exchanged.
- The Crown of Sweden was to receive an indemnity in the form of several nobles' estates in Scania in return for the returning of Bornholm to Denmark. The Danish Crown would later reimburse the nobles with estates in Denmark.
- Denmark was to pay an annual 3,500 riksdaler to maintain the beacons between Skagen on the Danish side and Falsterbo on the Swedish side.
- All prisoners of war on both sides were to be released.
- All previous treaties between Denmark and Sweden were reaffirmed.

== See also ==
- List of treaties
