= Rutsker =

Coordinates: 55.208889°N 14.743333°E

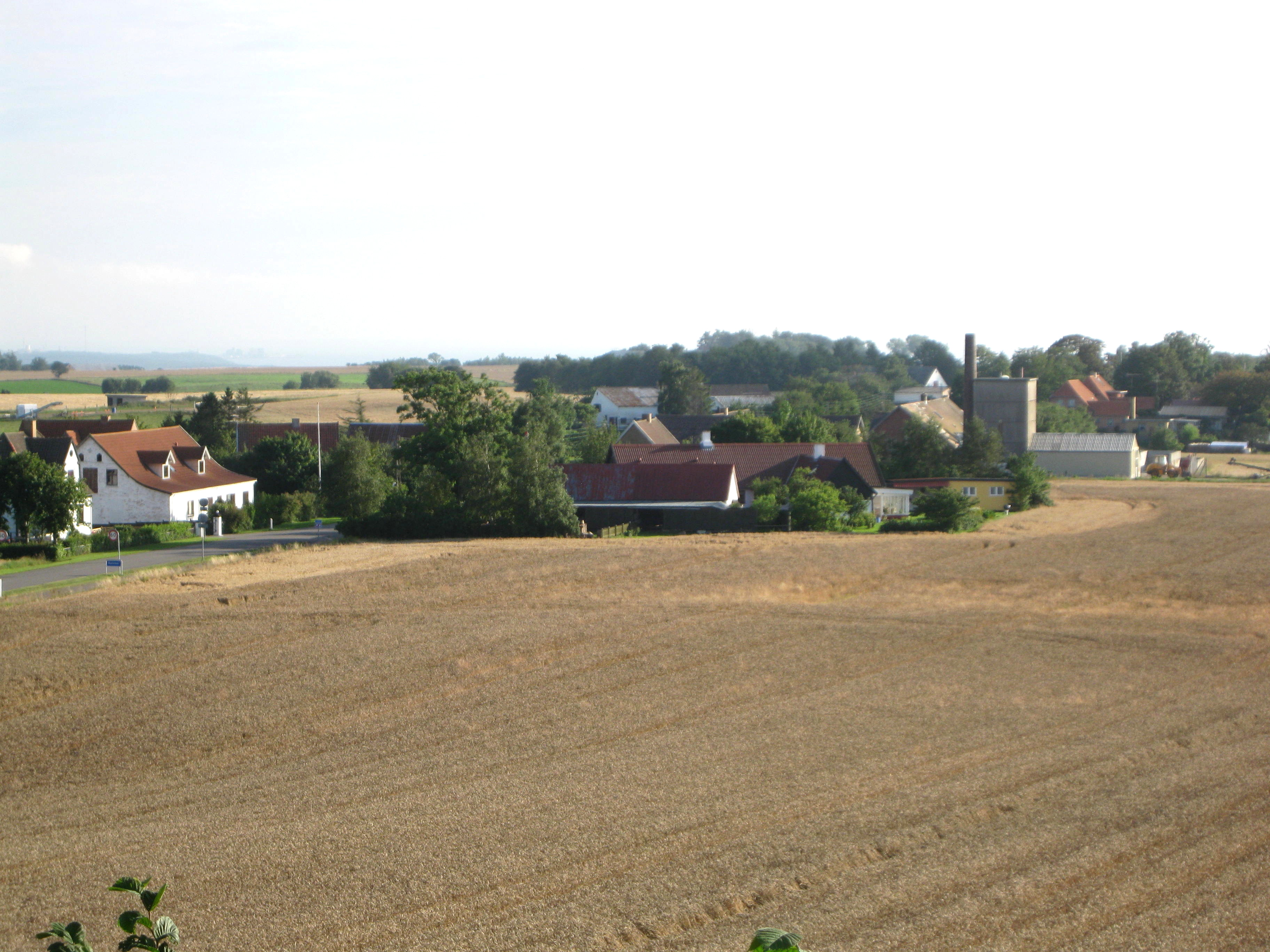
Rutsker

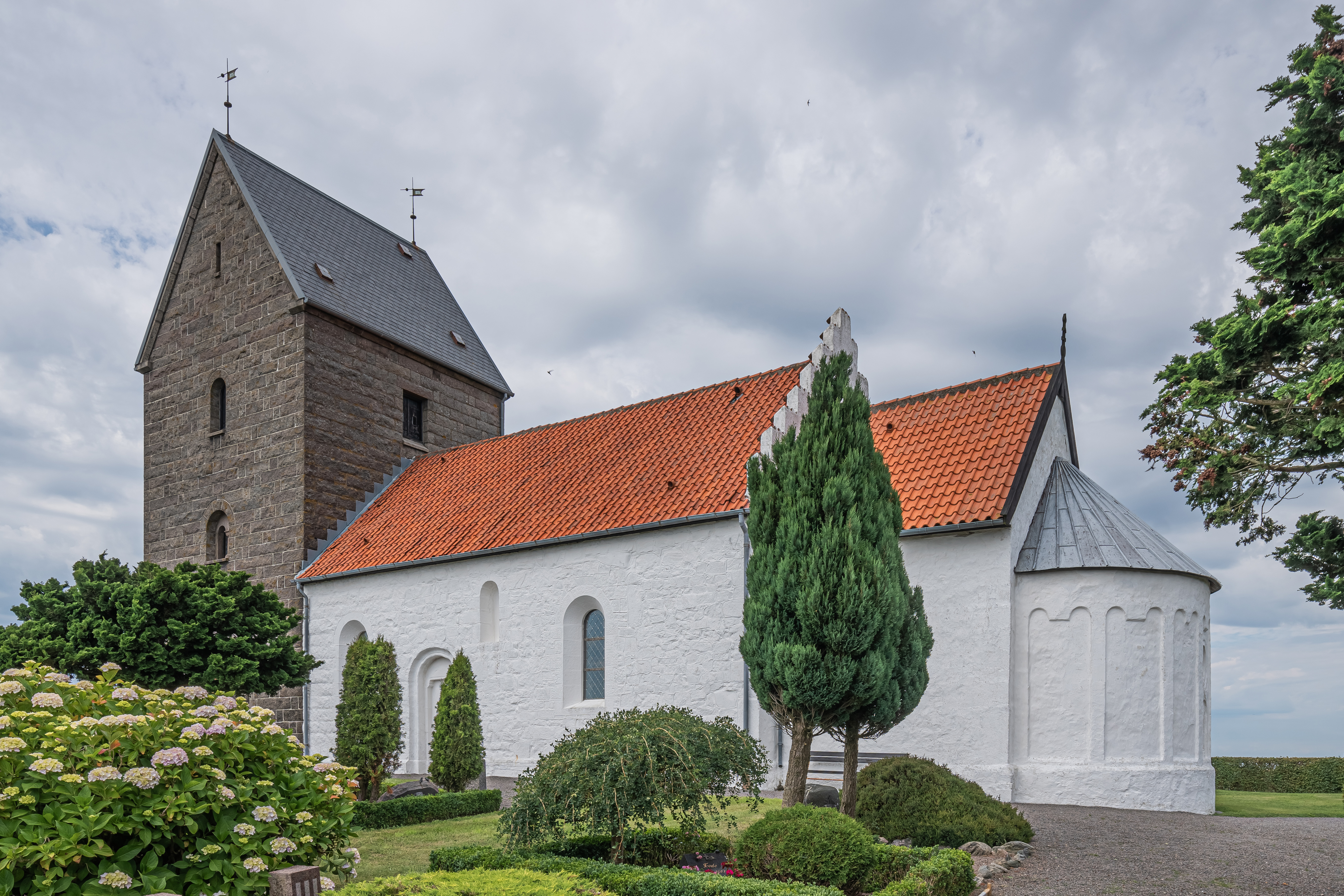
Ruth's Church

Rutsker is a small settlement in Rutsker Parish on the Danish island of Bornholm. It is situated in the north western part of the island, 3 km northeast of Hasle. The populated area lies immediately south of Ruth's Church. As of 2009, Rutsker has a population of 64, nine less than in 2004.

== Description ==
The locality is best known for Ruth's Church, from which it takes its name, "ker" meaning church in the Bornholm dialect. Standing on a hilltop 130 metres (430 ft) above sea level, it is the highest-lying church in Denmark. Commanding views over the surrounding countryside, it formerly served as a landmark for sailors in the Baltic Sea. Built in the Romanesque style around 1200, much of the original structure has been replaced by extension and reconstruction work. Its separately standing half-timbered bell tower is characteristic of Bornholm churches. With its adjacent rectory, the church stands high above the houses in the locality.

== Notable inhabitants ==
In the 17th century, Poul Ancher, who was the local priest from 1654 to 1697 fought for Bornholm's independence from the Swedes. Rutsker was also the birthplace of Michael Ancher (1849–1927), a key member of the impressionist Skagen Painters.
