= Sorthat-Muleby =

- Village
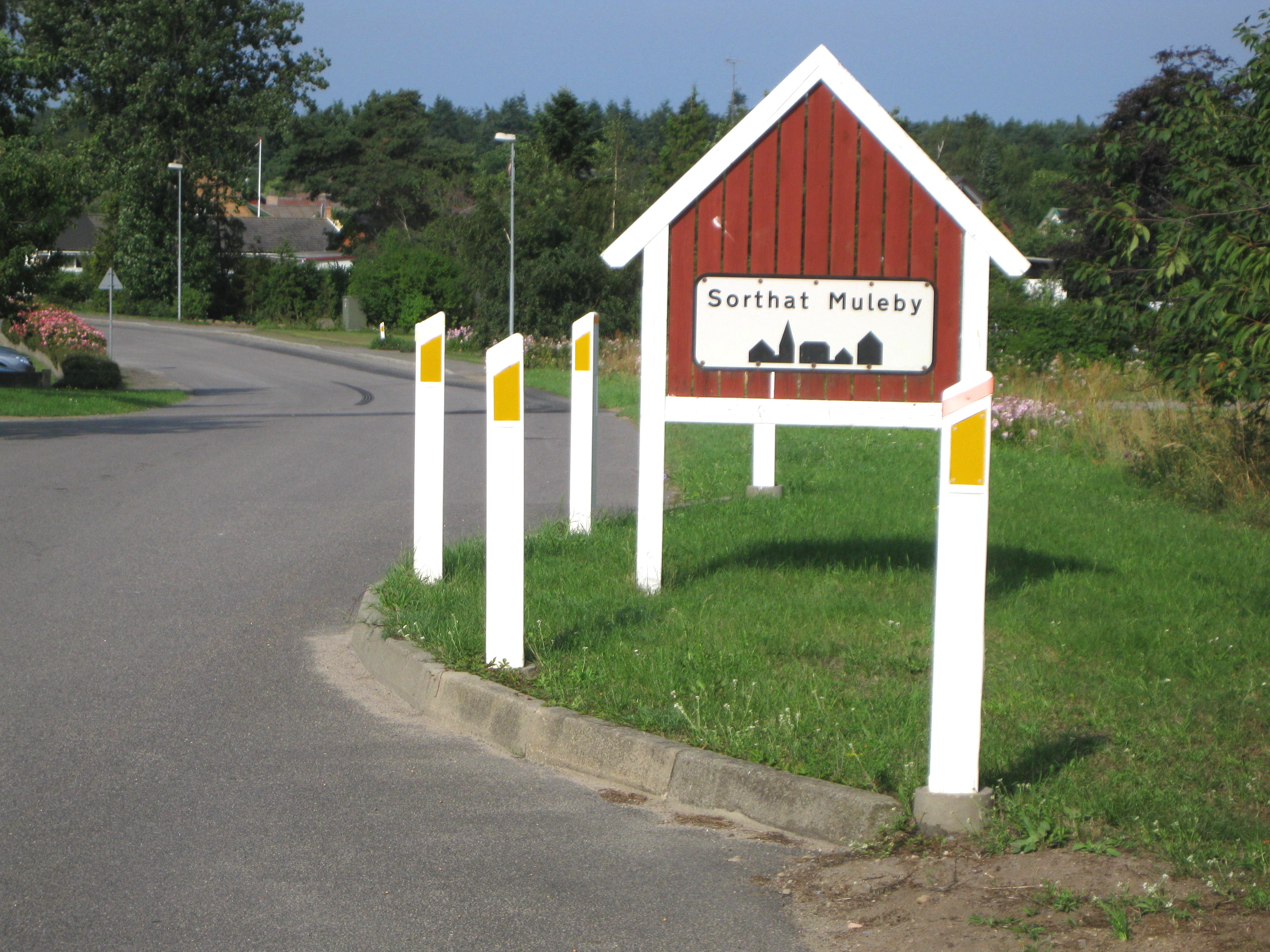
- Road into Sorthat-Muleby, Bornholm

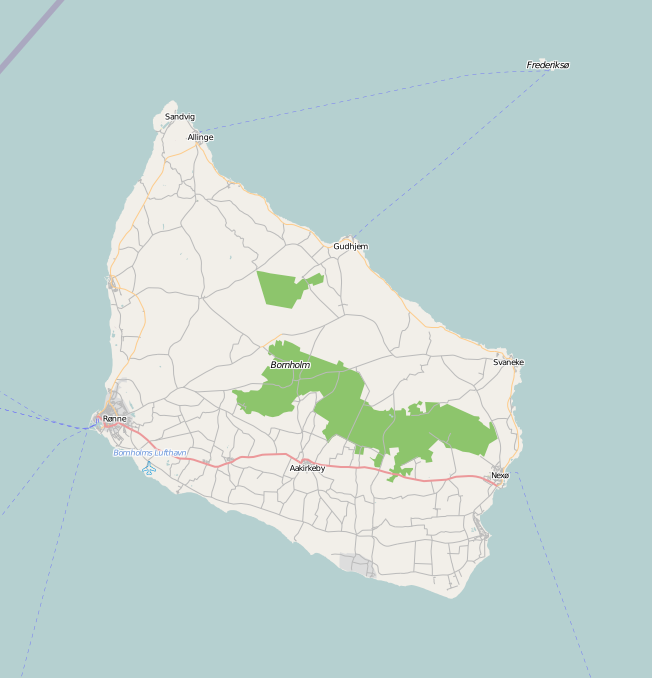
- Location on Bornholm
- Coordinates: 55°09′03″N 14°43′13″E
- Country: Denmark
- Region: Capital (Hovedstaden)
- Municipality: Bornholm

Population (2026)
  - Total: 472
- Time zone: UTC+1 (CET)
  - Summer (DST): UTC+2 (CEST)

Sorthat-Muleby is a village in the southwest of the Danish island of Bornholm, 6 kilometres (3.7 mi) north of Rønne and 4 kilometres (2.5 mi) south of Hasle. Muleby to the north and Sorthat to the south now form a single urban area. As of 2026, it has a population of 472.

== Description ==
Sorthat-Muleby is essentially a satellite town serving Rønne and Hasle. It enjoys an attractive location close to forests and the coast. Sorthat consists of rows of residential housing parallel to Nyker Strandvej and the Sahara summer house development at the southern end of the settlement. Muleby, north of the stream known as Mulebyå, is also a residential town with a number of small houses from the 1950s built for those working in the nearby clay mineral deposits and tile factory Hasle Klinker- og Chamottestensfabrik, which made heat refracting tiles for ovens. This factory closed in 1997. The yellow tiles are used as pavement stones in the towns on the island. On the eastern side of Muleby, there is a cement factory, opened in 1947, which employs about 50. The coastal strip known as Sorthat Odde has an impressive array of wild plants including crowberry, heather, linnea and smyrnium.

== History ==
The area still bears traces of the earlier quarrying of coal, gravel, clay and lake chalk, leaving three pleasant lakes in the Hasle Lystskov woods. There are also the remains of old coastal defenses including entrenchments, batteries and a beacon. On the beach next to Klinkerskoven woods, the old Sorthat Battery with its cannons has been preserved. In the fields to the east of Sorthat, there are prehistorical remains including a Bronze Age grave site. Sorthat (In English: Black Hat) was named after a big black hat shaped rock in the waters west of the Sorthat village. A local tale tells a Viking age story about a large strong woman (In Danish: Jættekvinde) in Sweden throwing the rock after a man on Bornholm, who she wanted to kill. The stone missed its target and plumped into the water. Muleby (In English: Muzzle town) was named after the shape of the area around Muleby, which takes the shape of the muzzle of a horse easily visible on historical lowland maps of Bornholm.
