= The Book on Adler =

Book by Søren Kierkegaard

- Hardcover edition
- Author: Søren Kierkegaard
- Original title: Bogen om Adler
- Language: Danish
- Series: Second authorship (Signed/Direct)
- Genre: Philosophy
- Publication date: Written c. 1847, published posthumously in 1872
- Publication place: Denmark
- Pages: ~450

The Book on Adler (subtitle: The Religious Confusion of the Present Age, Illustrated by Magister Adler as a Phenomenon, A Mimical Monograph) is a work by the Danish philosopher Søren Kierkegaard, written during his second authorship, and was published posthumously in 1872. The work is partly about pastor Adolph Peter Adler who claimed to have received a revelation. After some questionable acts, Adler was subsequently dismissed from his pastor duties. Adler later claimed it was work of genius, and not of revelation.

The rest of the work focuses on the concept of authority and how it relates to Adler's situation. Kierkegaard was against claims of received revelation without due consideration.

== Reception ==
The American philosopher Stanley Cavell helped to re-introduce the book to modern philosophical readers in his collection Must We Mean What We Say? (1969).

Johannes Hohlenberg, a student of Kierkegaard's writings, said of the work: "The book is extraordinarily revealing, because it shows the working of Kierkegaard's mind better than any of the other books. If we want to get an idea of what qualitative dialectics has to say when turned upon a very definite question, we ought to study the book about Adler".
