= Frederik Ludvig Liebenberg =

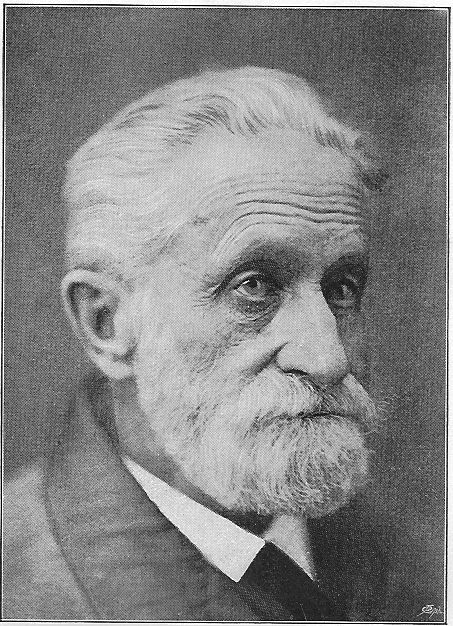
Frederick Louis Liebenberg

Frederik Ludvig Liebenberg (August 16, 1810 – 23 January 1894), was a Danish literary historian, translator, critic and publisher. He is remembered especially for his editions of Ludvig Holberg and Adam Oehlenschläger.

== Childhood and education ==
Liebenberg, son of Lutheran pastor and royal confessor, Michael Frederik Liebenberg (1767–1828), was born August 16, 1810, in Copenhagen, Denmark. He was said to be a weak child who was spoiled by his mother with the result that he was a slow starter. It was not until he was eight years old that he started at Pogeskolen, his first school.

In 1823, he was sent Copenhagen’s most prestigious private school, Borgerdydskolen (Civic Virtue School), whose headmaster, the legendary Michael Nielsen (1776–1846), was said to be a cross between a tyrant and a pedant. Liebenberg would later recount in his memoirs that Adolph Peter Adler and Søren Kierkegaard were both in the same class from 1823 to 1827 where they established a close friendship. The school was not, however, suited to Liebenberg, who was not very industrious. He therefore left school and, after being tutored privately, entered university in 1828. He chose theology as his field of study, with Hebrew as a special subject. However, as these studies had little appeal for him, he soon abandoned them.

== Life ==
In 1840, breaking completely with theology, he began to pursue literary interests. Within a few years, he took on a rather fruitful field of activity as a publisher of Danish classics. As he became a devoted literary expert, Liebenberg showed a distinct preference for the lighter side of life. He was quick to socialize and develop new friendships.

He was particularly attracted by the freshness and originality of youth. In particular, from 1846 to 1858, when he held the post of library assistant at the students' association, he constantly displayed a youthful approach to the association's business and festivities, even after his hair had begun to gray. In the summer, he could be seen rambling through Zealands's forests with one or other of his younger friends. Indeed, young students, including Jacob Voltelen, Georg Brandes and Otto Borchsenius, were attracted by his kind disposition, his reliability and his unfailing love for literature.

'Old Liebenberg' became the centre of attraction for a host of young people who were always ready to celebrate special occasions with him. Celebrating his completion of 20 years at the university in 1848, Peter Heise composed a cantata for which Jens Christian Hostrup wrote the words, and Kristian Mantzius made a speech. On the occasion of the Oehlenschläger anniversary in 1879, Brandes delivered a cordial speech to his friend Liebenberg while Sophus Schandorph sang a wonderful song he had written for him.

Liebenberg's warm affection for youth probably also explains the enthusiasm and interest with which he followed the latest developments in Danish politics and intellectual life, though perhaps he went further than was customary for a man of his age. On January 23, 1894, at the age of almost 84, he died in his bright cozy, bachelor home in Frederiksberg.

== Literary activity ==
Liebenberg's literary activity is extensive. Already as a mature student, in 1839 he translated a collection of tales by Émile Souvestre. Fædrelandet, the Danish newspaper, commented on the excellent standard of his Danish prose. Later, from October 1855 to June 1857, he translated the short stories of Adelheid Reinbold (nom de plume Franz Berthold) and published them in installments in a paper entitled Avertissementstidende or "Advertising Times".

Of much greater importance are his editions of Danish authors. Since abandoning his theology studies, he immediately embarked on his task of publishing the neglected works of Adolph Wilhelm Schack von Staffeldt whose Samlede Digte or Collected Poems appeared in two volumes in 1843. This was followed in 1847 and 1851 by the two-volume work: Samlinger til Schack Staffeldts Levned or "Collections for Schack Staffeldt's Life". The great lyric poet was regarded almost as rediscovered and received a eulogy in Johan Ludvig Heiberg's Intelligensblade which would have been more appropriate for Staffeldt during his lifetime.

From 1847 to 1854, with the support of Israel Levin, Liebenberg published Holberg's plays in eight volumes. In 1845, he had already written a short introduction on Holberg entitled Betænkning over den Holbergske Orthografi or "Reflections on Holberg's Spelling".

From 1850 to 1855, with the preliminary assistance of Christian Thaarup, he published the Samtlige Skrifter or "Collected Works" of Johannes Ewald in eight volumes, as well as an additional volume of Udvalgte Skrifter or "Selected Works" by Ewald. These works, however, led to unpleasant consequences for Lieberberg who was accused of coming close to infringing the rights of publisher E.L. Thaarup and his brother.

In 1855, Liebenberg published a shortened edition of Christian Hvid Bredahl's Dramatiske Scener I-VI or "Dramatic Scenes". In 1856, came Holberg's 'Peter Paars', and in 1857 Frantz Johannes Hansen's Poetiske Skrifter I-II or 'Poetic Works'. From 1857 to 1865, he completed his 32-volume work on Oehlenschläger's Poetiske Skrifter or "Poetic Works" in 32 volumes. Oehlenschläger was an author Liebenberg had known as a young man and had learned to love. He then published a revised version of Charlotte Biehl's free translation of 'Don Quixote' I-II (1865–1869) and new versions of Ludvig Holberg's Heltehistorier or "Stories of Heroes" (1864–1865), Mindre poetiske Skrifter or "Less Poetic Writings" (1866) and Kirkehistorie or "Church History" (1867–1868).

In his later years, Liebenberg repeatedly updated his editions covering the works of Holberg, Schack Staffeldt and Oehlenschläger, always demonstrating great interest for them and sometimes adding new commentaries. In 1877, his published his edition of Emil Aarestrup's Samlede Digte or "Collected Poems".

== Criticism ==
Until recently, Liebenberg's works were considered exemplary. His Holberg editions have, however, now been strongly criticized. In particular, he is said to have taken an over-pedantic view of Holdberg's spelling, making it look more dated than Holberg would have wished. Some have maintained that it would have been more useful if Liebenberg had discussed the actual texts of Holberg's plays, including the great master's own carelessness in his writings which led him to introduce corrections of his own.

Similarly, there has been criticism of his Oehlenschläger editions as he initially insisted on keeping strictly to the poet's own presentation but failed to maintain the approach later, for example in the 1879 edition of Udvalgte Tragedier or "Selected Tragedies".

But there can be no criticism of Liebenberg's diligence and care, or of the order and accuracy behind all his works, aspects which were often forgotten by earlier publishers.

== Sources ==
- Bricka, Carl Frederik (1887–1905). DANSK BIOGRAFISK LEXIKON (in Danish). Vol. X. Bind. Laale - Løvenørn. Copenhagen: Gyldendalske Boghandels Forlag (F. Hegel & Søn).
- Liebenberg, Frederik Ludvig (1894). Nogle Optegnelser om mit Levned (in Danish). Copenhagen: Gyldendalske Boghandels Forlag.
- Rubow, Paul V. (1947). Oehlenschlægers Arvtagere - Kristian Arentzen og F.L. Liebenberg (in Danish). Copenhagen: Ejnar Munksgaard.
