= Hasle Church, Bornholm =

Coordinates: 55.182233°N 14.708285°E

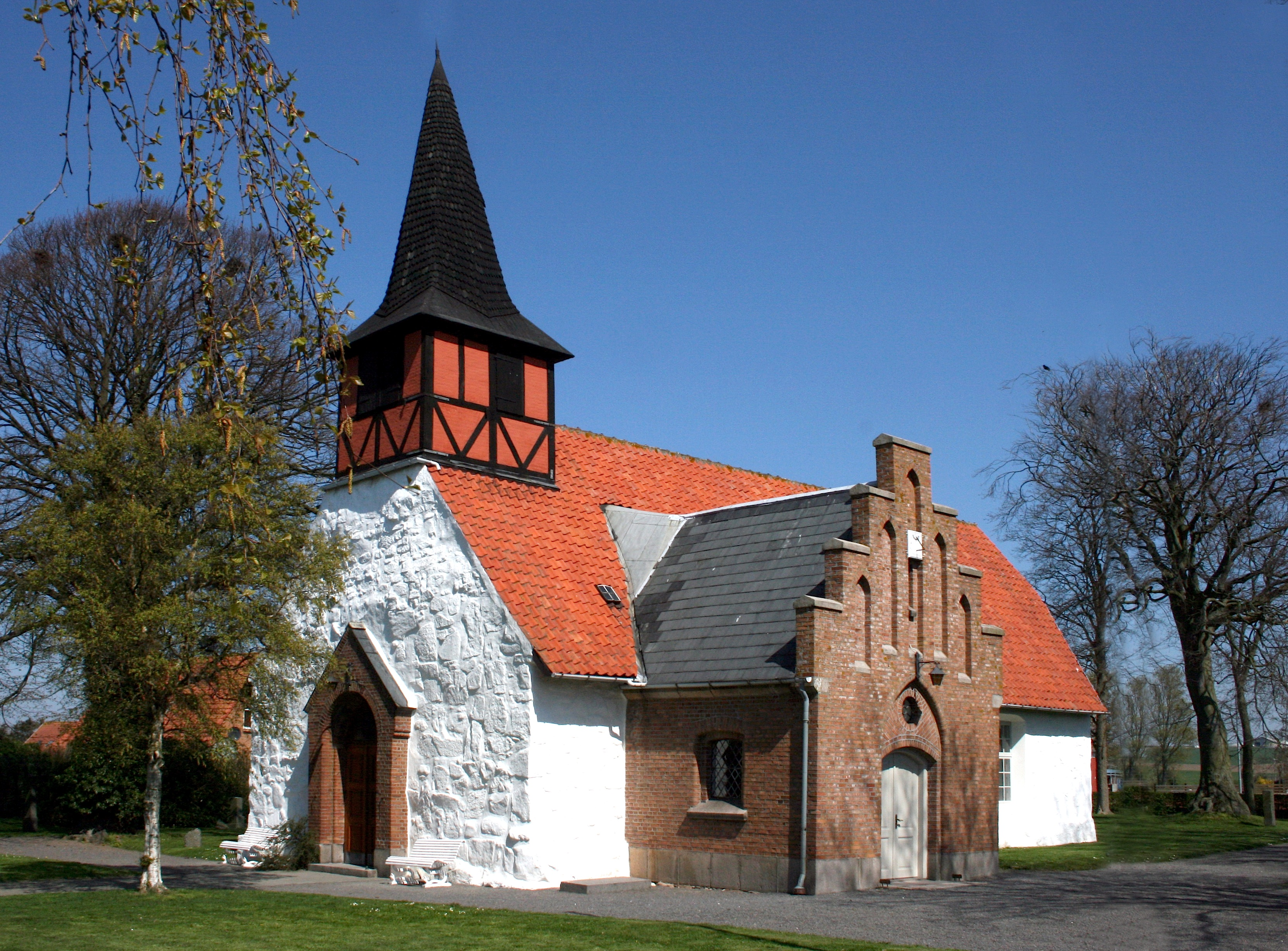
Hasle Church, Bornholm

Hasle Church (Hasle Kirke) is the parish church of Hasle, a port on the western coast of the Danish island of Bornholm. It is located on a hill to the east of the town overlooking the harbour.

== History and architecture ==
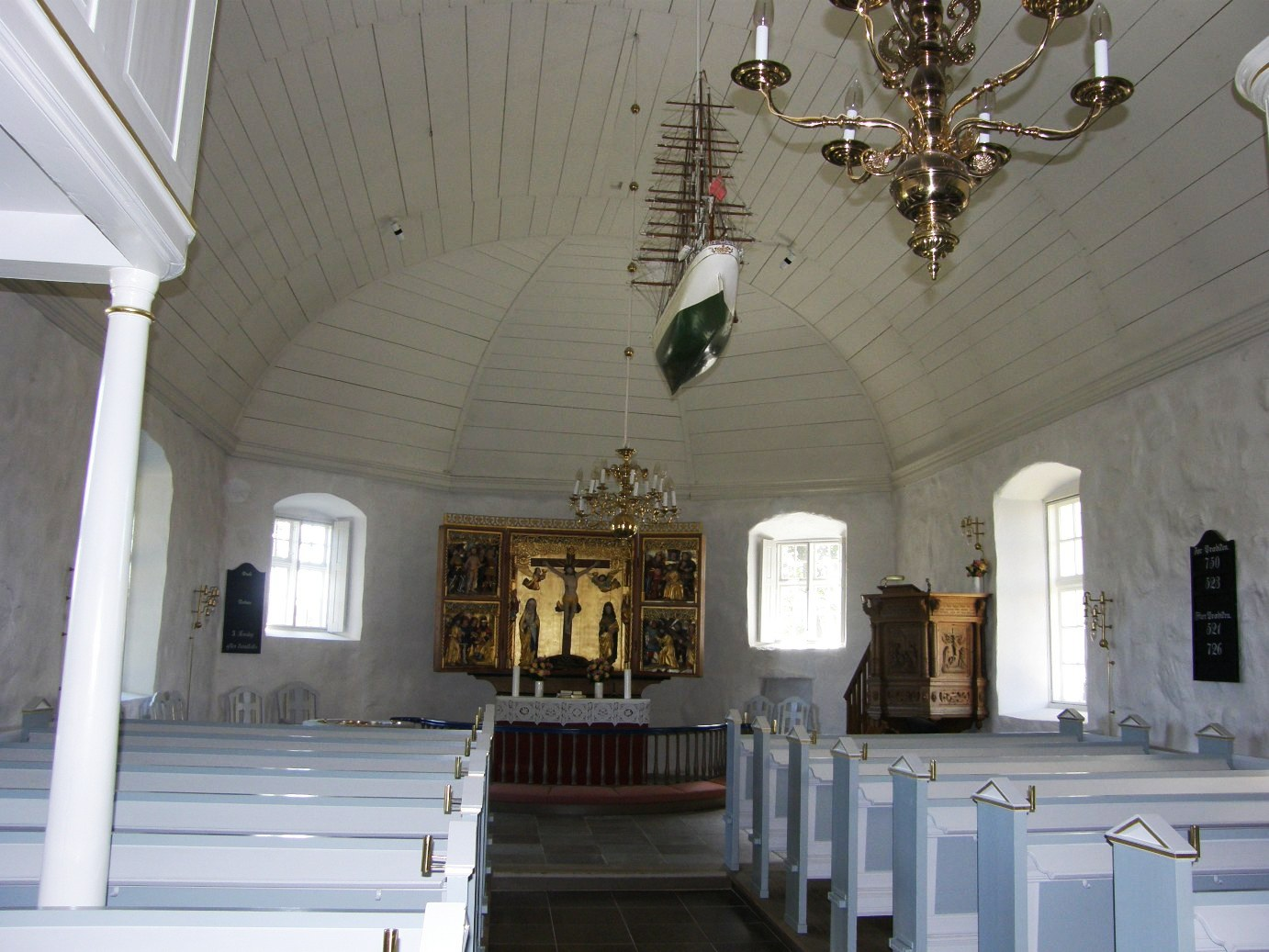
Hasle Church nave

The building originally consisted of a Late Gothic longhouse nave with a three-sided chancel at the eastern end. Constructed of fieldstone, it dates from the 15th century and was first documented as Hasle Chapel (Hasle Capell) in 1569. The spire at the western end was rebuilt in 1758 and the southern porch was added in 1882. In 1887, the main entrance was moved to the western end of the building. The walls of the nave are some 3 metres high with wooden-framed windows dating from c. 1833. Inside the church, there is a large niche on the south side of the chancel.

== Interior ==
The vaulted ceiling was added in 1847. The carved triptych above the altar from the early 16th century depicts the crucifixion in the centre panel while the two-sectioned panel to the north shows Jesus being whipped and his appearance before Pontius Pilate and that to the right shows the crown of thorns and Jesus bearing the cross. Until 1847 the altarpiece had five panels and is believed to have come from Lübeck. The pulpit from the late 16th century is probably of Flemish origin. The organ gallery at the western end of the building dates from the 18th century. The 13th century Gotland limestone baptismal font has a wide flat bowl with a conical bottom while its sloping sides are decorated with pointed arches.

== See also ==
- List of churches on Bornholm
