= Ruth's Church =

Coordinates: 55°12′55″N 14°45′01″E

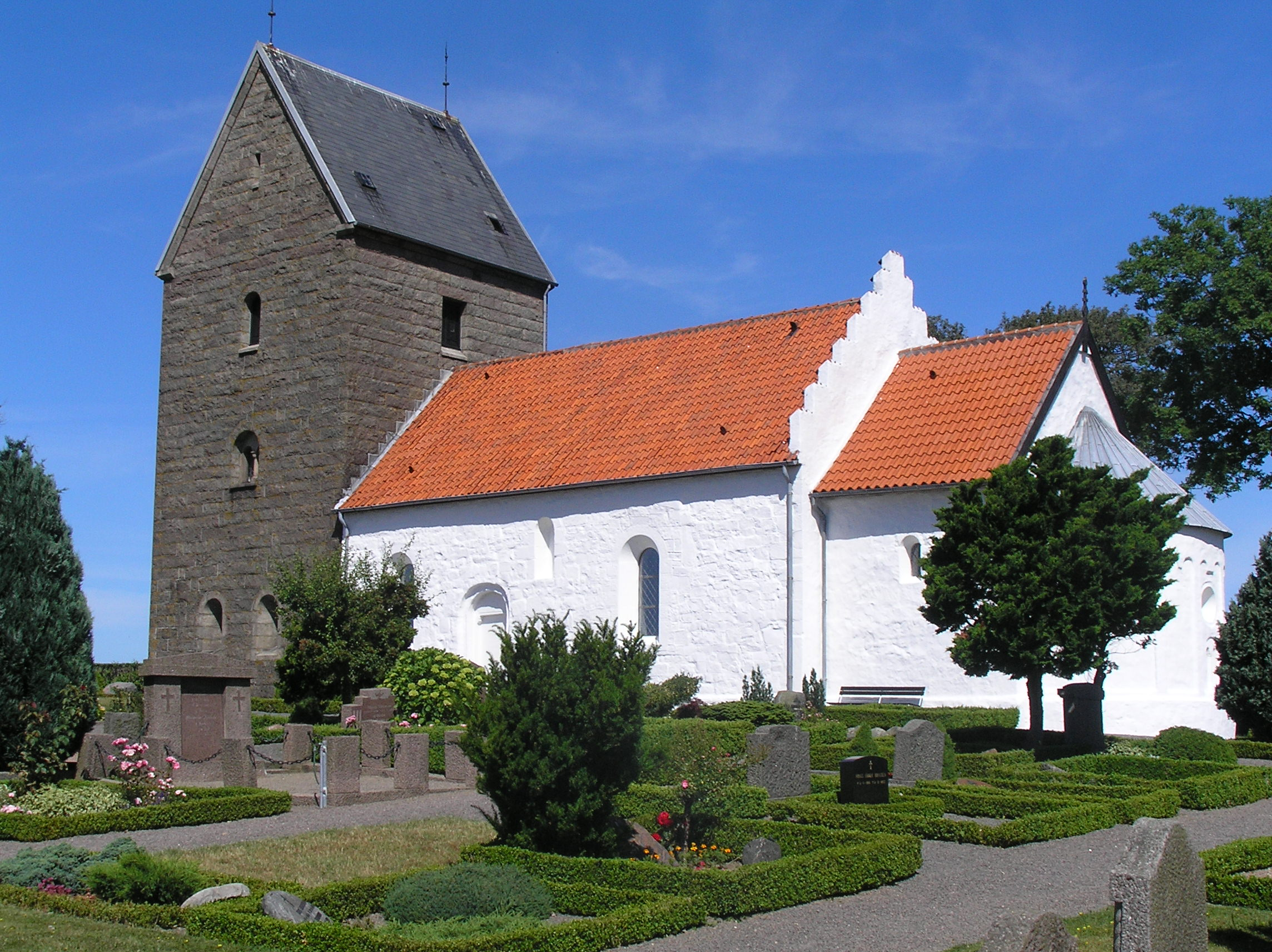
Ruth's Church, Rutsker

Ruth's Church (Danish: Ruts Kirke) is a parish church located in the village of Rutsker near Hasle on the Danish island of Bornholm. The church was built in the early 13th century in the Romanesque style. Situated on a hilltop 130 m above sea level, it is the island's highest-standing church.

== History ==
The oldest reference to the church dates from 1490, where Sancti Michelssogen (St Michael's Parish) is mentioned. The church was initially consecrated as St. Michael's, possibly because of its high location. By 1621, the name had become Ruth's Church (ecclesia Rutziana) after Ruth the Moabite in the Old Testament. The church was probably built in the 13th century with a nave and chancel. The tower at the west end and the porch on the south side were added later. The chancel and the finely rounded apsis are part of the original structure. At the end of the 19th century, the north wing was added. The old tower and porch were removed a little later, the nave was lengthened by some 3 metres and a new tower was built.

== Belltower ==
Constructed in the second half of the 16th century, the belltower in the churchyard is said to be the oldest on the island. It has not, however, been used since 1886 when the bells were transferred to the new tower at the west end of the church.

== Frescos and font ==
In 1908, frescos were discovered in the late Gothic apsis vaults. Depicting the signs of the evangelists, they were restored in 1930. Next to the fresco of Matthew, the date 1559 can be seen. Also of interest is the granite Romanesque font which is almost cylindrical in shape.

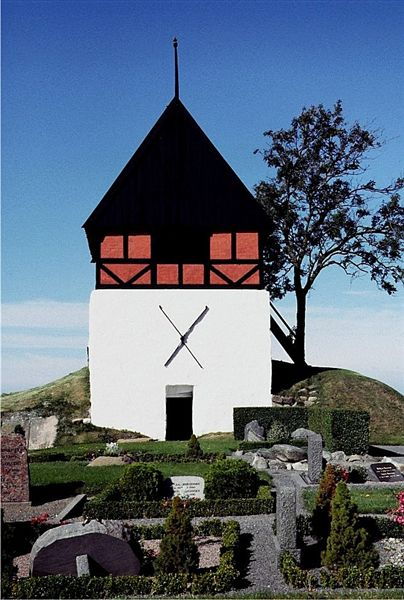
The old bell tower

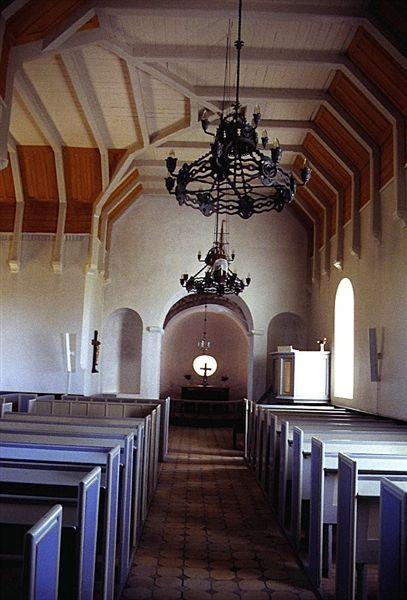
Nave and chancel

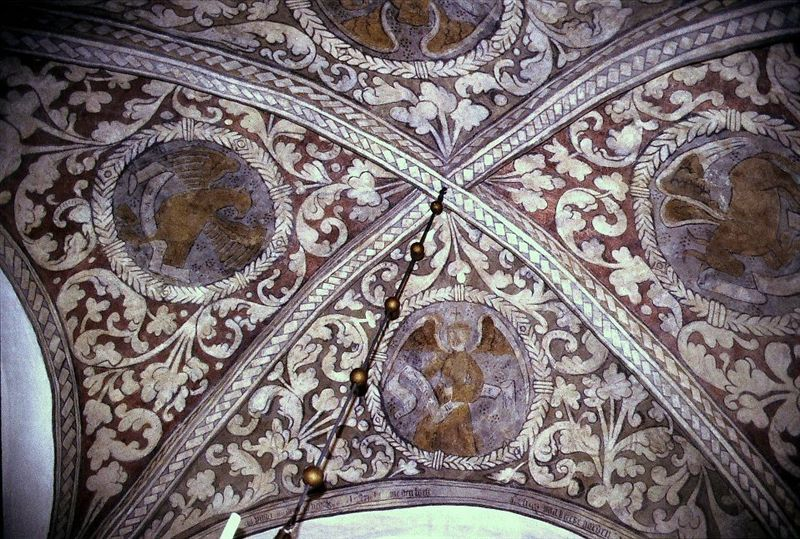
Frescos in the apsis

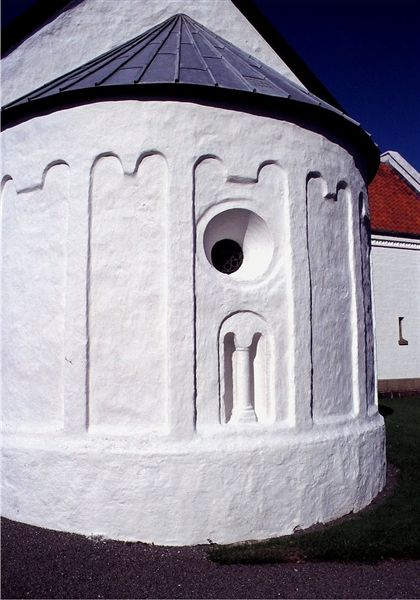
The rounded apsis

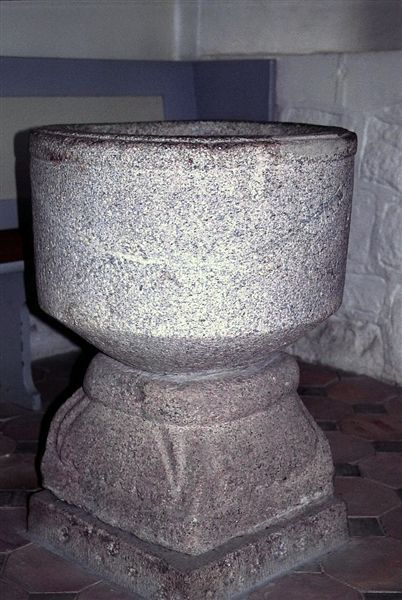
The font

== See also ==
- List of churches on Bornholm
