= Johan Printzensköld =

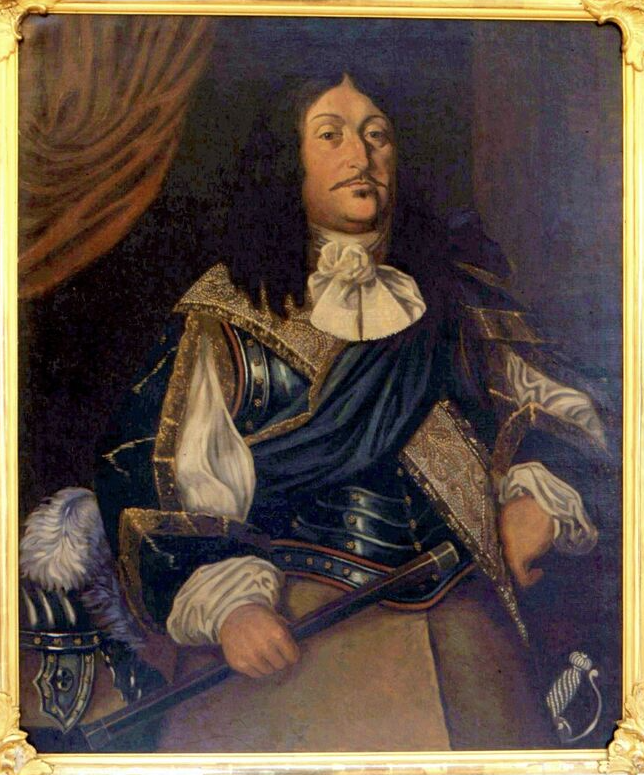
Colonel Johan Printzensköld, painted in 1899 by Carl Printzensköld, as a copy from a 1649 painting

Johan Printzensköld (c. 1615 – December 8, 1658) was a Swedish army officer. As lieutenant colonel he was the commandant of Bornholm between March and December 1658. A revolt broke out on the island against the Swedish occupation, and Printzensköld was killed in Rønne, the capital of Bornholm, on December 8, 1658.

== Career ==
Little is known of Printzensköld's life. He was the son of a priest by the name Jakob Printz. His noble surname hints that he was nobled for his service in the Thirty Years War, in which Sweden participated between 1630 and 1648.

Denmark declared war on Sweden in 1657, but was defeated by Charles X of Sweden and his battle-hardened veterans. The harsh terms of the Treaty of Roskilde dictated among other things that Bornholm was to be part of Sweden, starting on March 15, 1658. Printzensköld was named the king's head representative on Bornholm. He arrived with a Swedish military force of 116 men on April 29. At the time Bornholm had a population of around 8,000.

== Death ==
In November 1658, a conspiracy between Bornholmers was started, egged on by the Danish crown which appealed to its loyal citizens to resist the occupiers. A golden opportunity presented itself to the conspirators on December 8. They learned that Printzensköld was to ride, unescorted, from the Swedish headquarters in Hammershus to Rønne to prepare for reinforcements from Sweden. Five conspirators rode into Rønne, to the mayor's house where Printzensköld was staying. A struggle broke out, with the mayor vainly trying to break up the fight. Printzensköld was dragged to Storegade (Main street), where some of the town's burghers had gathered. Shortly afterwards he was shot by Villum Clausen.
