= Hasle, Bornholm =

Hasle
- Town
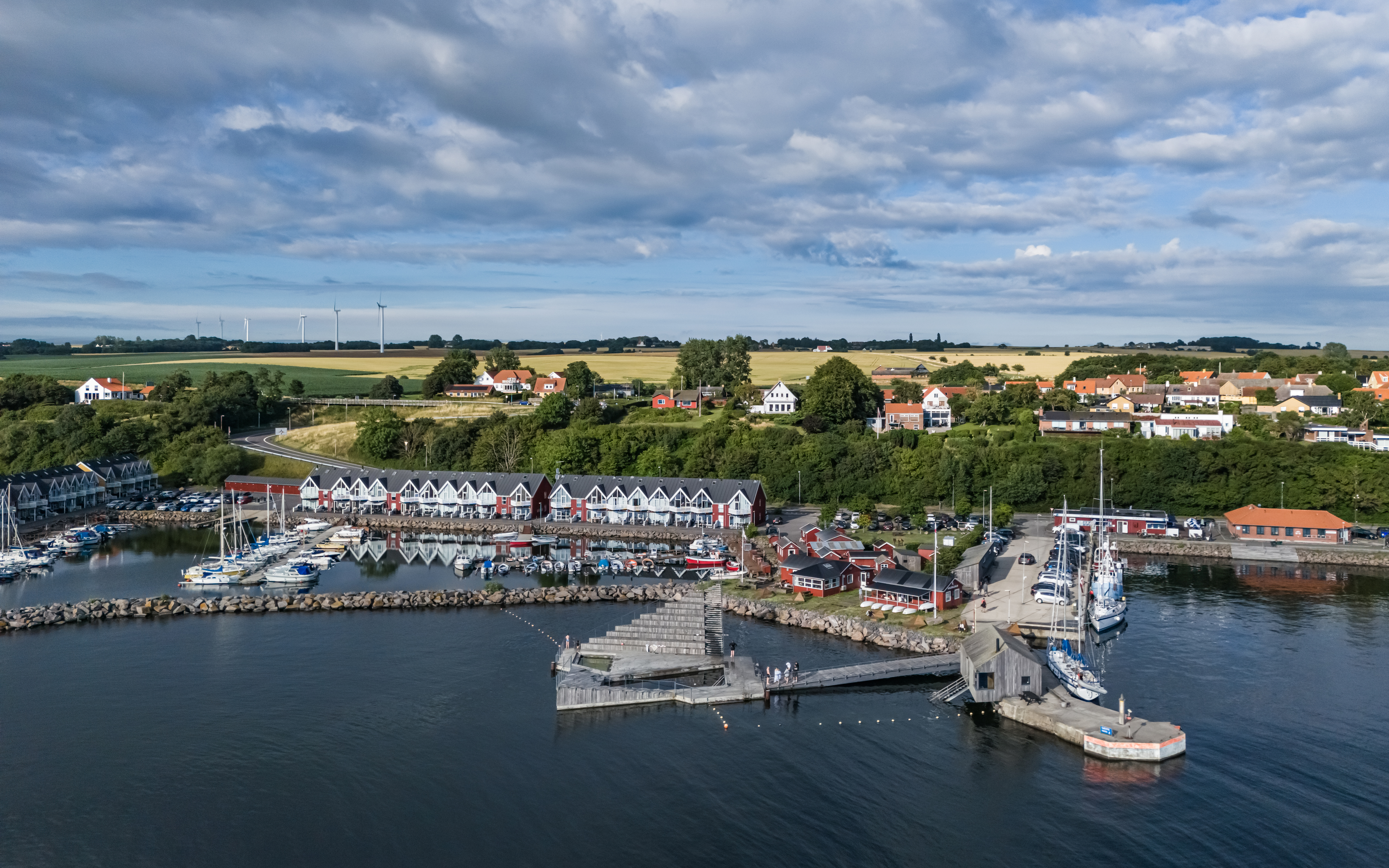
- Aerial view of the harbor

- Coat of arms

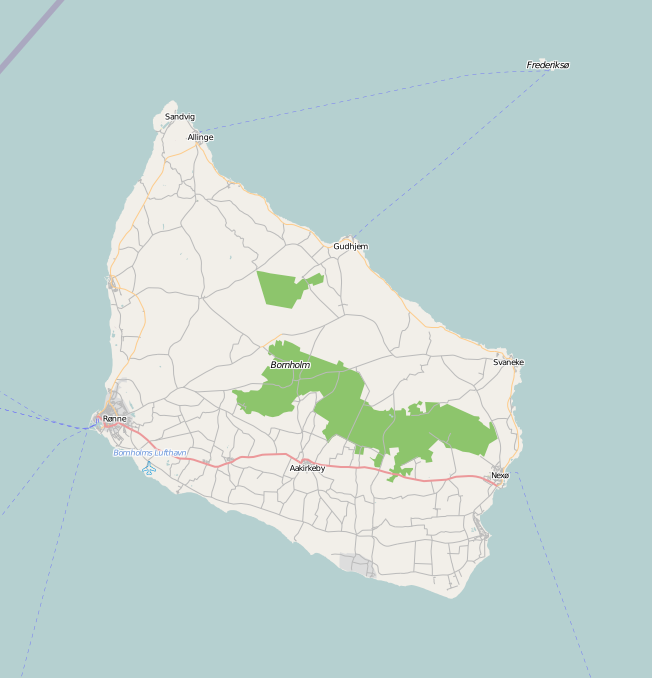
- Location on Bornholm
- Coordinates: 55°11′N 14°42′E
- Country: Denmark
- Region: Capital (Hovedstaden)
- Municipality: Bornholm

Area
  - Urban: 1.15 km^{2} (0.44 sq mi)

Population (2026)
  - Urban: 1,627
  - Urban density: 1,410/km^{2} (3,660/sq mi)
- Demonym: Haslebo
- Time zone: UTC+1 (CET)
  - Summer (DST): UTC+2 (CEST)

Hasle is a town and a former municipality on the west coast of the Baltic island of Bornholm, Denmark. Its population is 1,627 (as of 1 January 2026) The former municipality covered an area of 115 km^{2} (44 mi^{2}), and had a total population of 6,382. It is now included in the municipality of Bornholm. With its pleasant setting, smokehouses, galleries and harbour, the town attracts many tourists.

== History ==
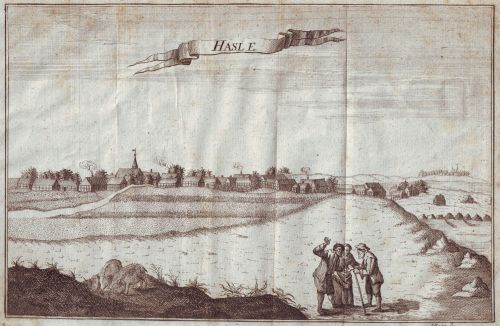
Hasle from the north with Rønne in the distance. Engraving by Jonas Haas (18th century)

The name "Hasle" appears to have originated from Old Danish "hasli", meaning "hazel", and was used in 1335 as the name of the northernmost of Bornholm's four counties (herreder) before being applied to the town in 1546. In the middle of the 16th century, Hasle was granted rights as a market town (which it maintains today as Bornholm's second smallest market town) authorizing it to have a local administration headed by a mayor and to practice manufacturing and trading. The town's location on fertile land next to the sea provided fine opportunities for cultivating vegetables (carrots) and fishing (herring, cod and salmon). By 1658, when the population reached 300, Hasle began to be noticed. The town is remembered for the role it played in the 17th century when under the leadership of Jens Pedersen Kofoed, a merchant, and Povl Hansen Ancher, the local priest, its citizens helped to free Bornholm from Swedish rule.

During the 17th and 18th centuries various attempts were made to exploit the natural resources in the area, especially coal from around Sorthat and Muleby. There was, however, little market for coal on Bornholm except during emergencies such as the English Wars (1807–1814). From the end of the 19th century, coal quarrying therefore gave way to tile production from the local clay, resulting in a market for Hasle tiles in Denmark and beyond. The industrial area south of the town testifies to its coal, glass and tile factories, all of which have now closed, while tiles abound in Hasle itself, even gracing its pavements.

The town's more recent prosperity is the result of the harbour, built in the late 19th century. As there was no natural harbour like those along Bornholm's north coast, the harbour had to be built from scratch. But it was above all the harbour which drove the local economy, as can be seen from the town's many smokehouses. Hasle also became a port of call on the steamship route to Copenhagen operated by the Østbornholmske Dampskipsselskab.

== Hasle today ==
The town has maintained its character with its half-timbered houses and its more recent funkis additions. Its nine old farmhouses enhance the local heritage. Tourists are attracted by the whitewashed smokehouses, one of which is now a museum, and by the arts and crafts galleries. Part of the harbour is still used by fishing boats while a large area accommodates pleasure craft. There are hotels, restaurants, summer houses and camping facilities in the area.

== Churches ==
Ruth's Church to the east of Hasle stands on a hilltop 130 m above sea level. The belltower is said to be the oldest on the island. Hasle Church itself, built in the 15th century in a Late Gothic style, has a carved, early 16th century triptych.

== Gallery ==
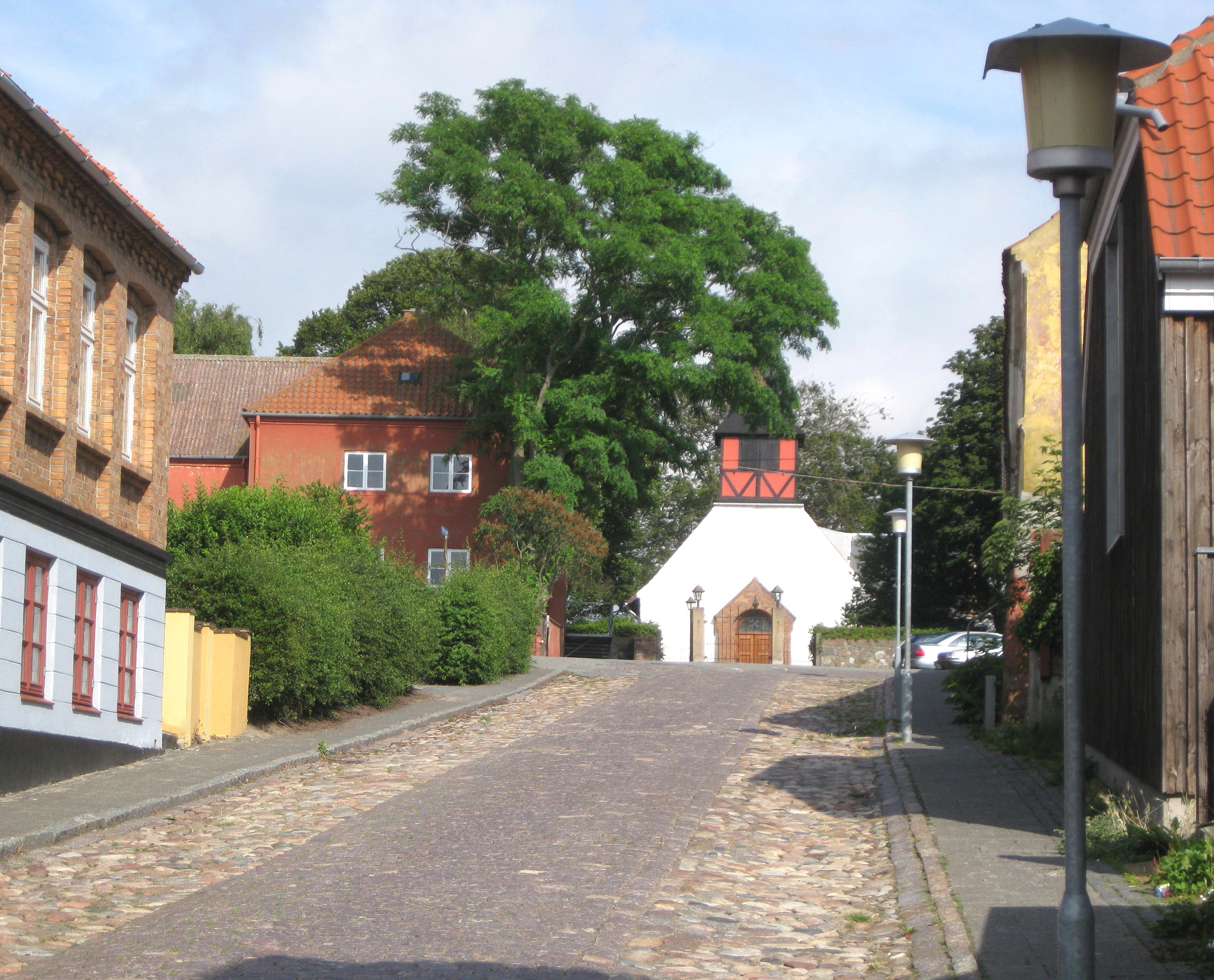
Street to the church

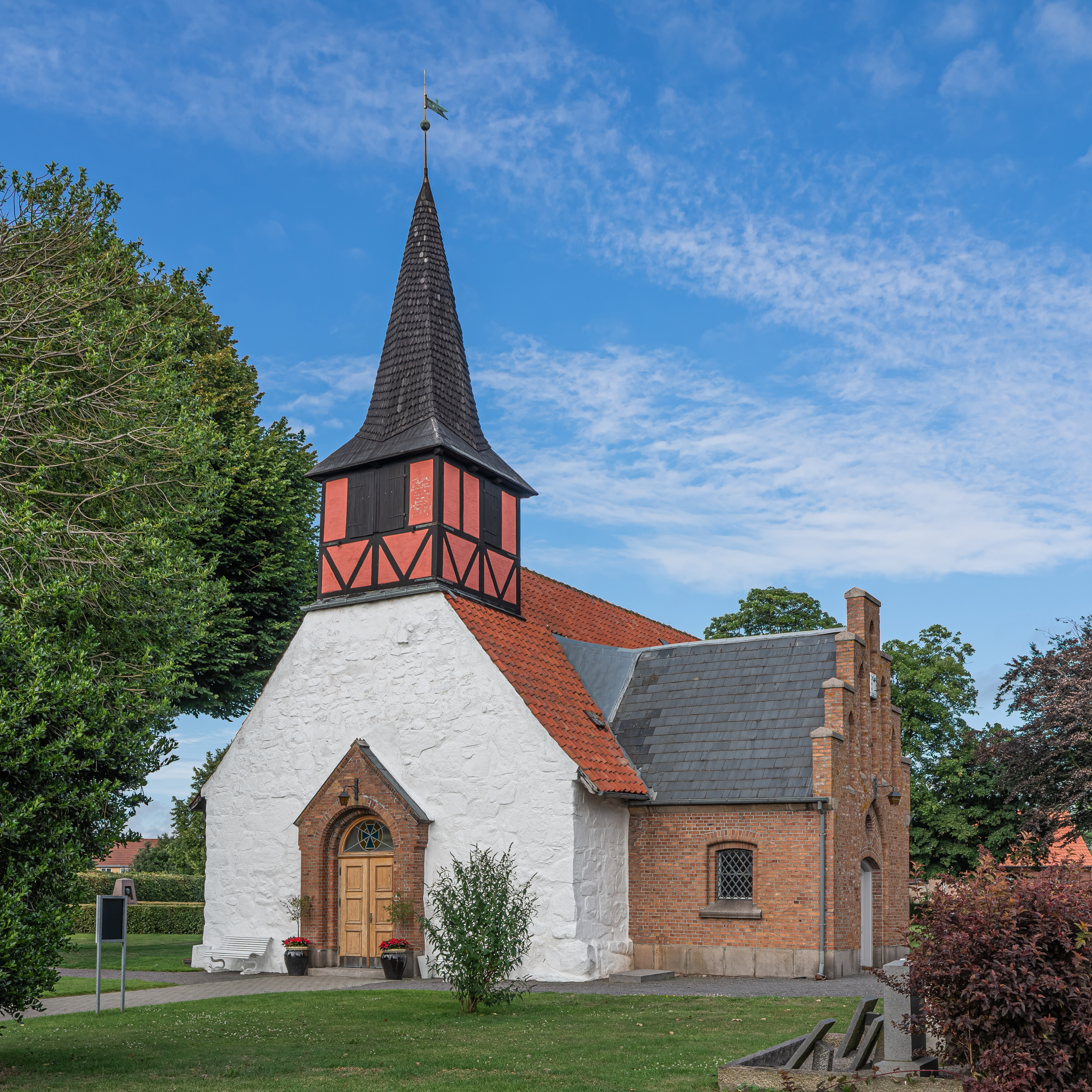
Hasle Church

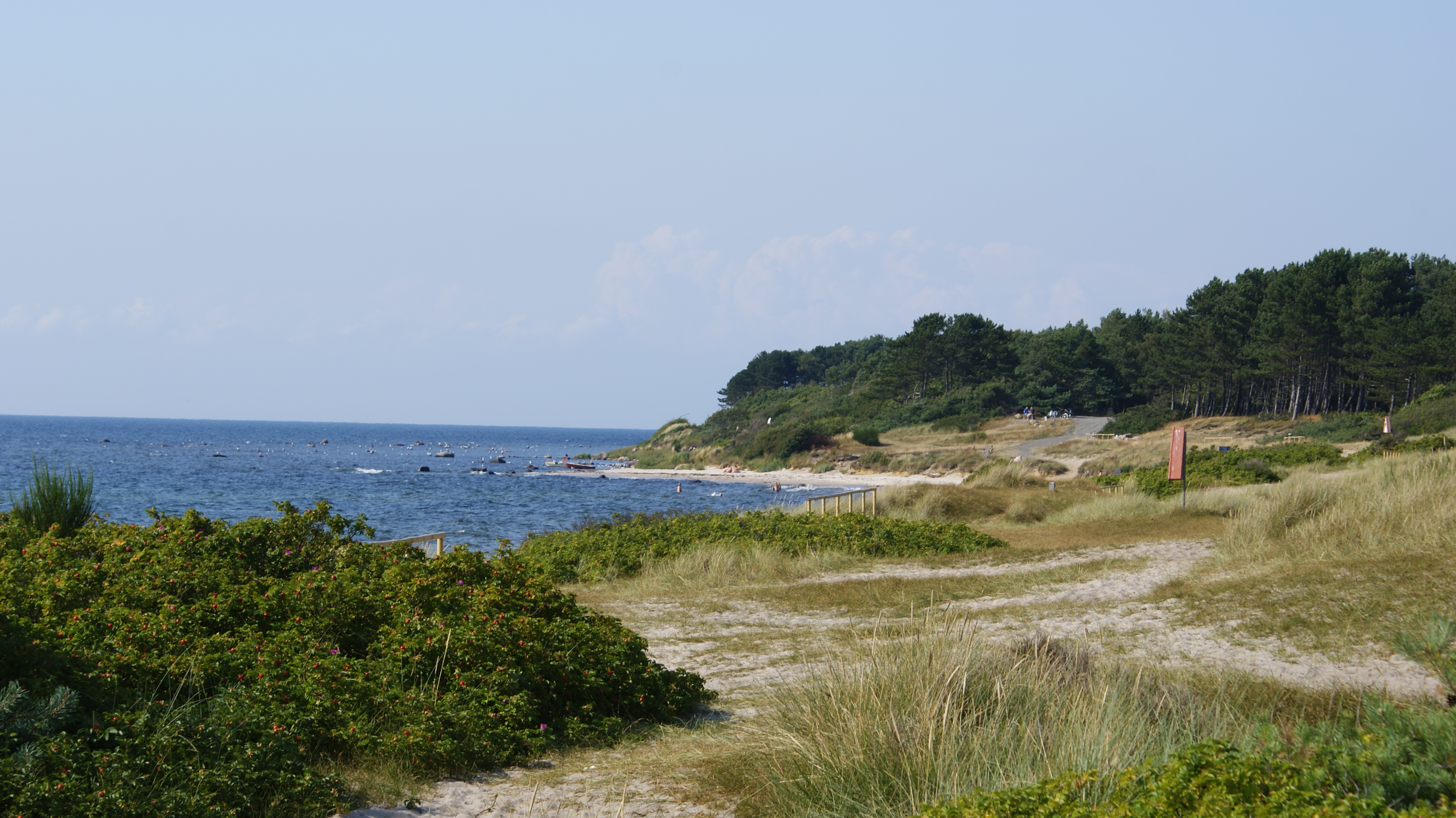
Hasle beach

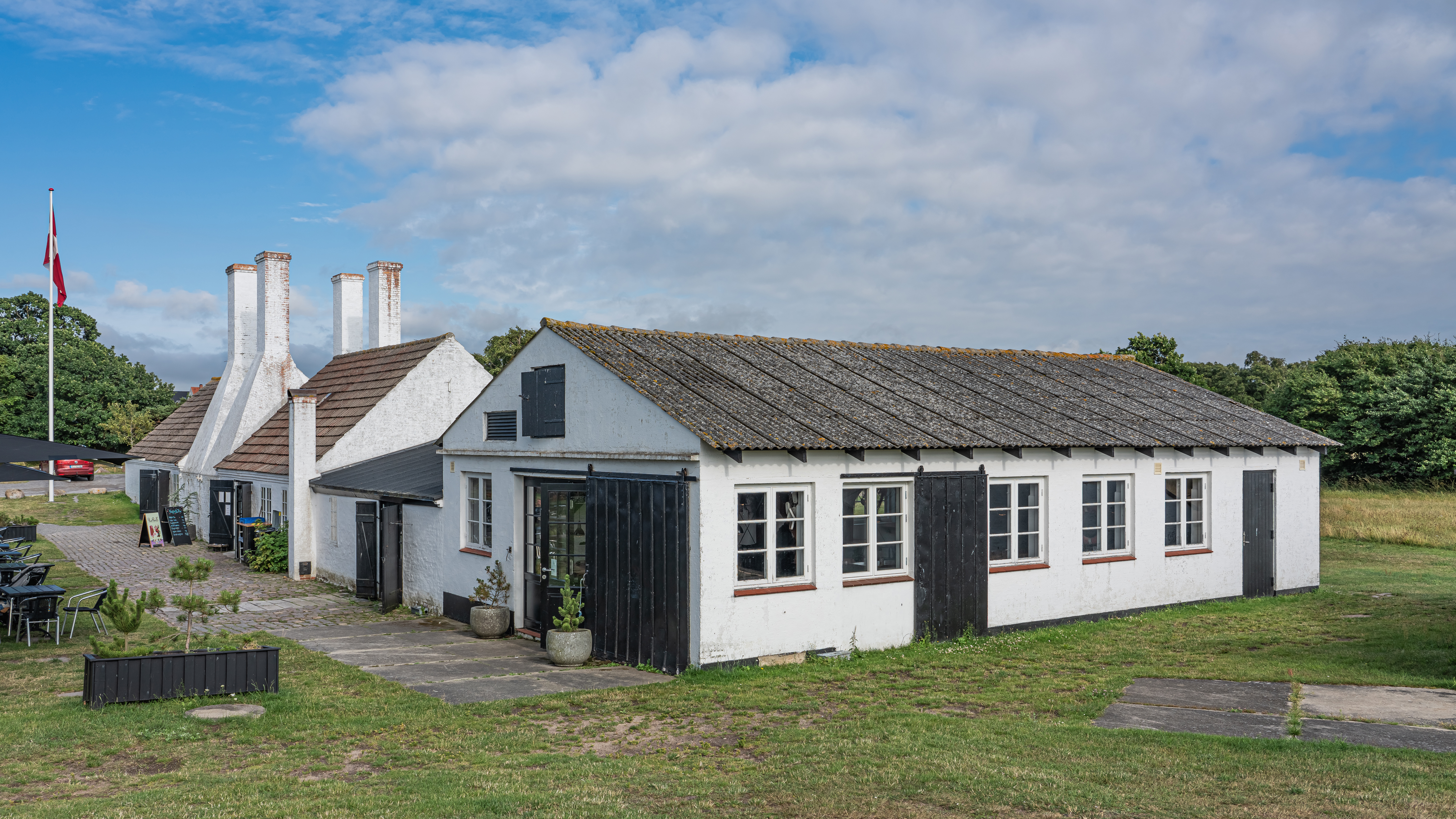
Smokehouse
