= Treaty of Roskilde =

1658 territorial settlement between Denmark–Norway and Sweden

- Light green areas were ceded to Sweden, striped areas were ceded to Sweden and later returned to Denmark-Norway after the Treaty of Copenhagen in 1660. Turquoise (Halland) was occupied by Sweden since before the treaty and was now permanently ceded to Sweden.
- Type: Bilateral treaty
- Signed: 8 March 1658
- Location: Roskilde, Denmark
- Original signatories: (Denmark–Norway) Frederick III; (Swedish Empire) Charles X Gustav
- Ratifiers: Denmark–Norway; (yes) Swedish Empire

The Treaty of Roskilde was negotiated at the parsonage of Høje Taastrup Church and was concluded on 26 February (OS) or 8 March 1658 (NS) in the Danish city of Roskilde during the Second Northern War between Frederick III of Denmark–Norway and Karl X Gustav of Sweden. After a devastating defeat, Denmark–Norway was forced to give up a third of its territory to save the rest, the ceded lands comprising Blekinge, Bornholm, Bohuslän, Scania and Trøndelag, as well as Halland.

After the treaty entered into force, Swedish forces continued to campaign in the remainder of Denmark–Norway, but had to withdraw from the Danish isles and Trøndelag in the face of a Dano–Norwegian and Dutch alliance. The Treaty of Copenhagen restored Bornholm to Denmark and Trøndelag to Norway in 1660, while the other provinces transferred in Roskilde remained Swedish.

== Background ==
As the Northern Wars progressed, Charles X Gustav of Sweden crossed the frozen straits from Jutland and occupied the Danish island of Zealand, with the invasion beginning on 11 February 1658. A preliminary treaty, the Treaty of Taastrup, was signed on 18 February 1658 with the final treaty, the Treaty of Roskilde, signed on 26 February 1658.

== Provisions ==
The Swedish Empire at its height in 1658

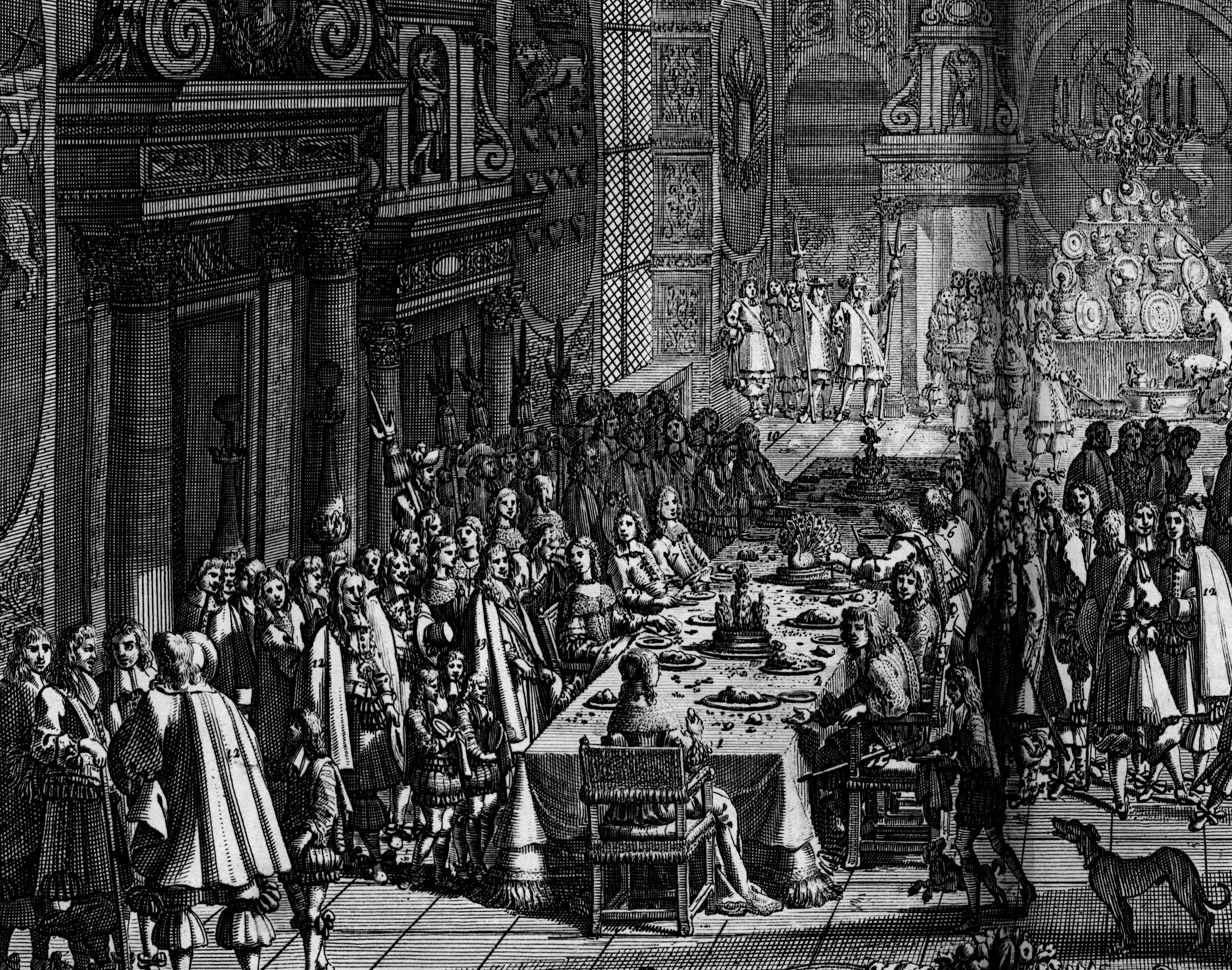
The peace banquet (Fredstaffelet) at Frederiksborg Castle, following the signing of the Treaty of Roskilde in 1658

The treaty's conditions included:

- The immediate cession of the Danish province Scania to Sweden.
- The immediate cession of the Danish province Blekinge to Sweden.
- The immediate cession of the Danish province Halland to Sweden. Under the terms of the prior 1645 Peace of Brömsebro, Halland was on lease to Sweden for a term of 30 years.
- The immediate cession of the Danish province of Bornholm to Sweden.
- The immediate cession of the Norwegian province of Bohuslän to Sweden. This effectively secured for Sweden unrestricted access to western trade.
- The immediate cession of the Norwegian province of Trøndelag, then including Nordmøre and Romsdal, to Sweden.
- Danish renunciation of all anti-Swedish alliances.
- Danish prevention of any warships hostile to Sweden passing through the straits into the Baltic.
- Restoration of the Duke of Holstein-Gottorp to his estates.
- Danish payment for Swedish occupation forces costs.
- Danish provision of troops to serve Charles X Gustav in his broader wars.

== Aftermath ==
=== Copenhagen ===
The Swedish king was not content with his stunning victory. At the Swedish Council held at Gottorp on 7 July, Charles X Gustav resolved to wipe his inconvenient rival from the map of Europe. Without any warning, in defiance of international treaty, he ordered his troops to attack Denmark–Norway a second time. There followed an attack on the capital Copenhagen. Residents successfully defended themselves with help from the Dutch, who honored their 1649 treaty to defend Denmark against unprovoked invasion by sending an expeditionary fleet and army, defeating the Swedish fleet in the Battle of the Sound and relieving the capital. His army partly trapped at Landskrona and partly isolated on the Danish islands by superior Danish and Dutch forces under Vice-Admiral Michiel de Ruyter, Charles was forced to withdraw in 1659.

=== Bornholm and Trøndelag ===
Sweden also invaded Romsdal in western Norway. The local farmers rebelled and defied the Swedish taxes and military conscription vigorously. The Swedish governor was forced to send a full company of soldiers and 50 cavalry to collect taxes. The action was not successful, and the area remained largely autonomous.

Meanwhile, Norwegian forces succeeded in expelling the Swedish occupiers from Trøndelag. Eventually, the resulting Treaty of Copenhagen in 1660 restored Trøndelag to Norway, and the island of Bornholm to Denmark.

The relinquishment of Trøndelag by the Treaty of Copenhagen reflects strong local resistance to the Swedish occupation. Although the Swedish invasion had been welcomed, or at least not resisted, the Swedes issued conscription orders in Trøndelag and forced 2,000 men and boys down to 15 years of age to join the Swedish armies fighting in Poland and Brandenburg. King Carl X Gustav was afraid that the Trønders would rise against their Swedish occupiers, and thought it wise to keep a large part of the men away.

Only about one third of the men ever returned to their homes. Some of them were forced to settle in the Swedish province of Estonia, as the Swedes thought it would be easier to rule the Trønders there. Many of Trøndelag's men were already in the Dano-Norwegian army and navy, so the Swedish-forced conscription nearly emptied Trøndelag of males. The result was devastating, as the farms were left without enough hands to harvest the fields, and famine struck the region. Some local historians of Trøndelag have termed this the genocide of the Trønders.

The few months of experience with Swedish taxation and conscription left such bitter sentiments, that it served to strengthen Dano-Norwegian unity and patriotism, making resistance to Swedish invasions of Denmark–Norway stronger over the next 80 years.

=== Scania ===
In the ninth article of the Treaty of Roskilde, which ceded Scania (Skåne), the inhabitants of the Scanian lands were assured of their privileges, old laws and customs. However the territories were gradually integrated in the Swedish realm. The nobility was soon amalgamated with the Swedish nobility and introduced into the Swedish House of Lords with the same rights and privileges as the original Swedish noble families.

In 1676, Denmark attacked and conquered most of Scania in an attempt to take back the province, but Sweden reconquered it. The provincial Scanian Law was replaced by the national Swedish law in 1683. In the same year the national Danish law came into force in Denmark, also replacing provincial laws there. The Swedish Church Ordinance was introduced in 1686.

== See also ==
- Dominium maris baltici
- Torstenson War (1643–1645)
- Dano-Swedish War (1657–1658)
- List of treaties
