= Danish Runic Inscription 380 =

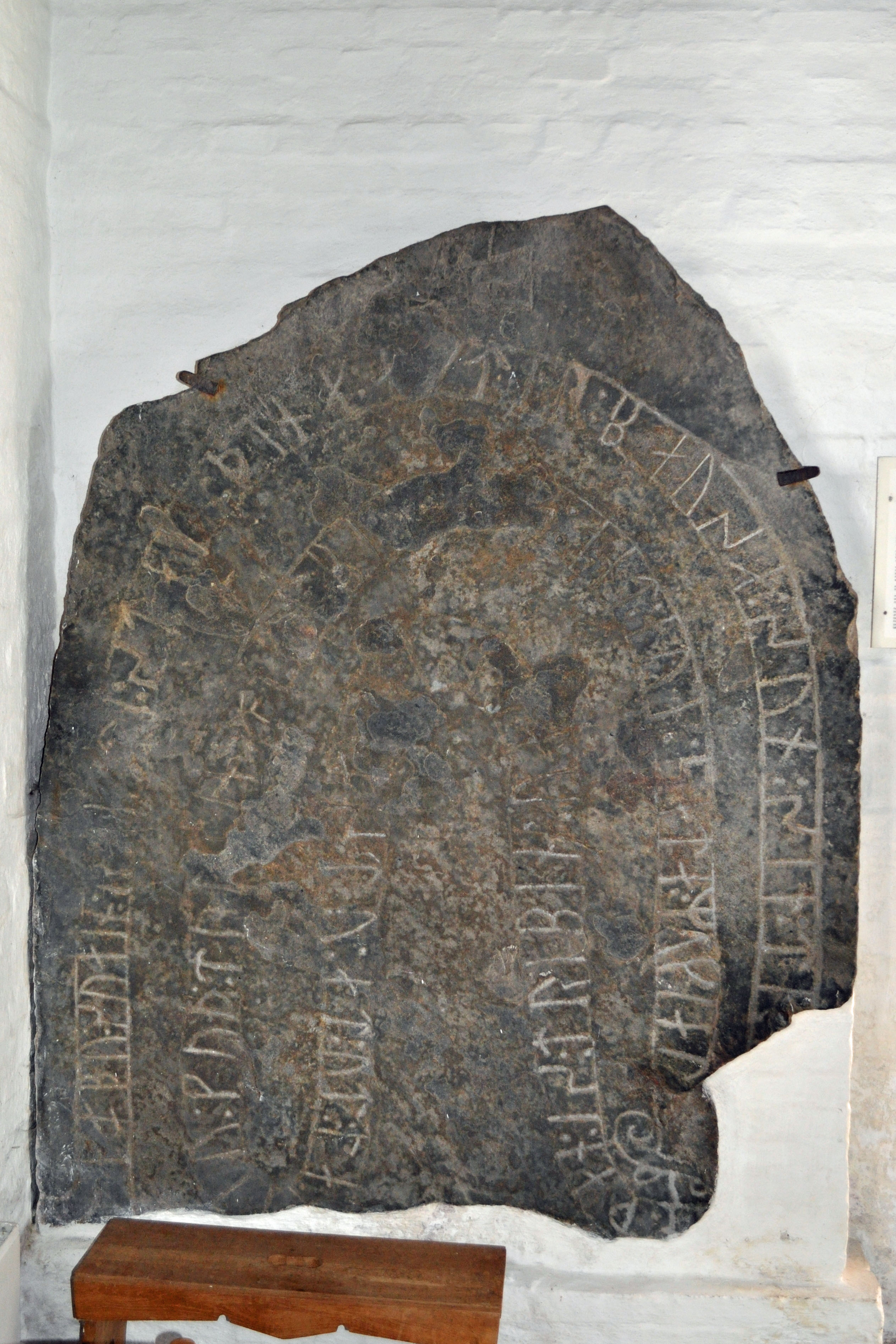
DR 380

The Nylarsker stone 2, Ny Larsker stone I or DR 380 is a Viking Age runestone engraved in Old Norse with the Younger Futhark runic alphabet on Bornholm. The runestone was discovered in 1643 and first mentioned in Ole Worm's Monumenta Danica. It was to be found outside the entrance of Nylars Church until 1855. It is securely dated to the period 1075–1125, and belongs to a group of Bornholm runestones that were made during the transition from the Viking Age to the Nordic Middle Ages. It made in sandstone and it is 186 cm tall, 146,5 cm wide and 17 cm thick, and the style of the runestone is the runestone style RAK.

The inscription is partly made in the Old Norse fornyrðislag meter (cf. Nielsen 1983:224-25) and consists of a traveller's or a soul formula. It possible that "Sveinn of the hooded cloak" was a descendant of the Jomsviking Sigurd of the hooded cloak who is said to have settled on Bornholm after the battle of Hjørungavåg ca. 986.

The language shows linguistic changes in "raisti" where there is a transition from sþ to st. The old ʀ-phoneme has merged with the r-phoneme as in "a(f)tir". The form "kobu" probably reflects a late u umlaut, and the form Mikial (Michael) has palatalization with parallels in West Norse and in Old Swedish (Brøndum Nielsen GG § 247). The ansuz rune is of a special form.

== Inscription ==
kobu:suain : raisti : stain : þ(e)na : a(f)tir : bausa : sun : sin : tr(i)... ...n : þan : is : tribin : ua(r)þ : i : (u)(r)ostu : at : ut:la(n)(k)iu : kuþ : tr(u)tin : hi(a)lbi : hans : ont : auk : sata : mikial :
Kopu-(?)Swen {} resþi {} sten {} þænna {} æftiʀ {} Bøsa, {} sun {} sin, {} dræ[ng] [goþa]n, {} þan {} æs {} dræpin {} warþ {} i {} orrostu {} at {} Utlængiu. {} Guþ {} drottin {} hialpi {} hans {} ond {} ok {} santa {} Mihael. {}
"Sveinn (of the hooded cloak? son of Kápa?) raised this stone in memory of Bausi, his son, a good valiant man, who was killed in battle at Útlengia. May Lord God and Saint Michael help his spirit. "
