= Lobbæk =

- Village
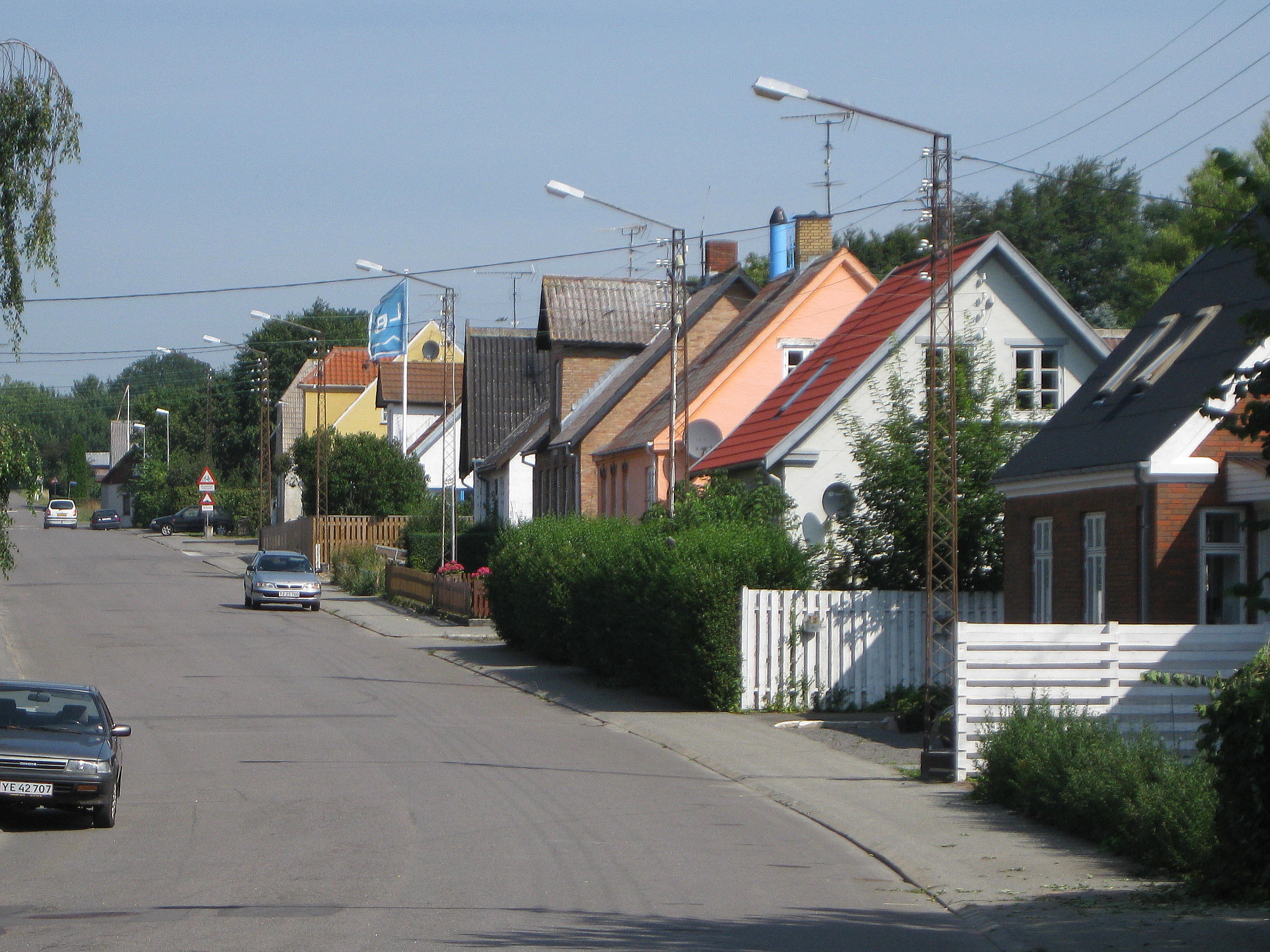
- Lobbæk, Bornholm

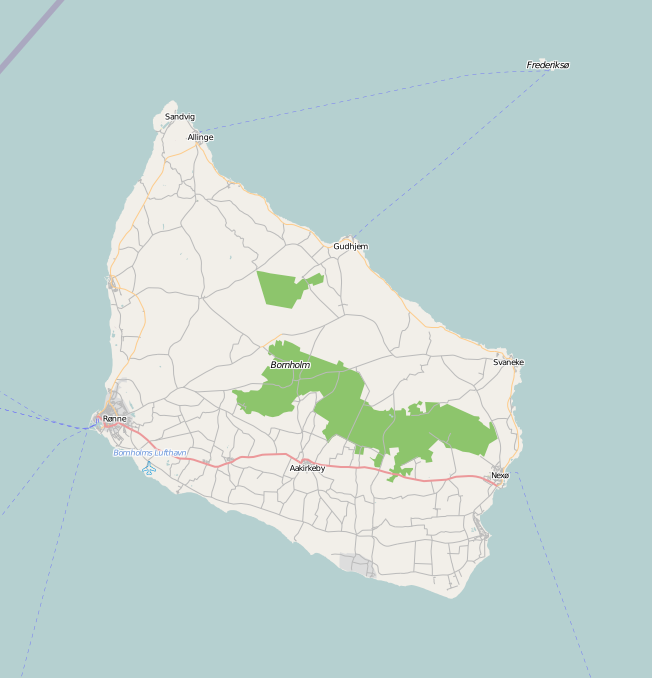
- Location on Bornholm
- Coordinates: 55°04′28″N 14°50′10″E
- Country: Denmark
- Region: Capital (Hovedstaden)
- Municipality: Bornholm

Population (2026)
  - Total: 305
- Time zone: UTC+1 (CET)
  - Summer (DST): UTC+2 (CEST)

Lobbæk is a village in the south of the Danish island of Bornholm, 10 kilometres (6.2 mi) east of Rønne and 6 kilometres (3.7 mi) west of Aakirkeby. It is mainly residential but has a few small firms. As of 2026, it has a population of 305.

== Description ==
The residential area on either side of Lobbæk Hovedgade is located north of the main road to Rønne and south of the old Rønne–Nexø railway, now a cycle track. On the west side of the village on Rønnevej there are a few small businesses including a building contractor, a farm machinery dealership and a car repair shop. Strangely, as a result of borders defined in 1616, the village belongs to two different parishes, the southwestern side to Nylars and the northeastern side to Vestermarie.

== History ==
Lobbæk takes its name from the stream which ran through an area called Lobberne. Old maps show that in the 1860s, there was a windmill called Myremøllen as well as a blacksmith. The Lobbæk Andelsmejeri dairy was founded in 1887 and operated until 1969. When the railway from Rønne to Nexø opened in 1900, Lobbæk Station attracted businesses and residents until the railway was closed in 1968. The old track has been converted into a cycle track which runs through the village.
