= Arnager =

- Village
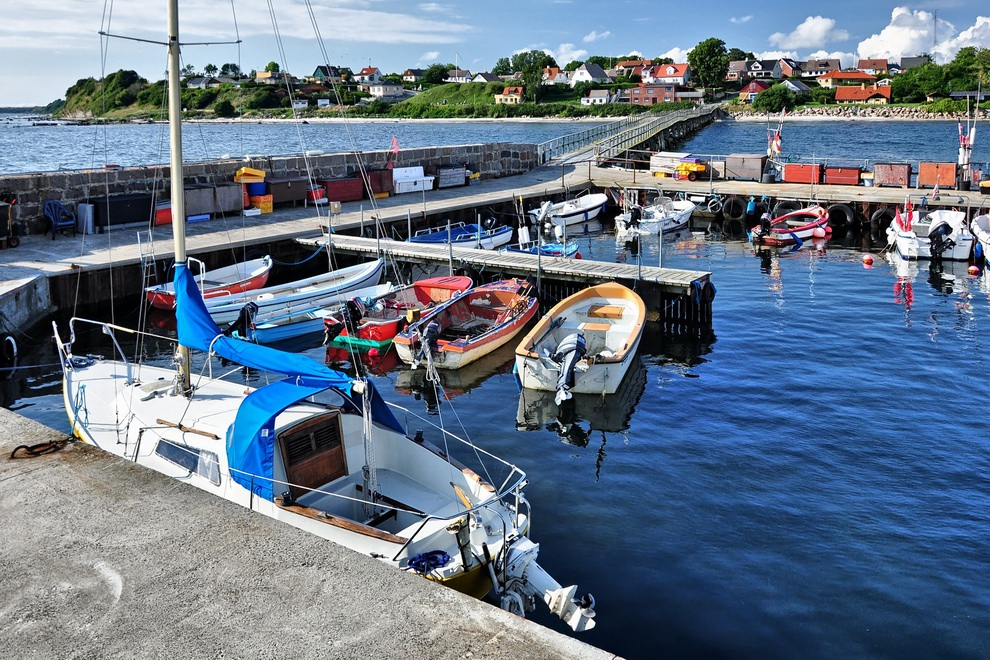
- Arnager harbour and pier.

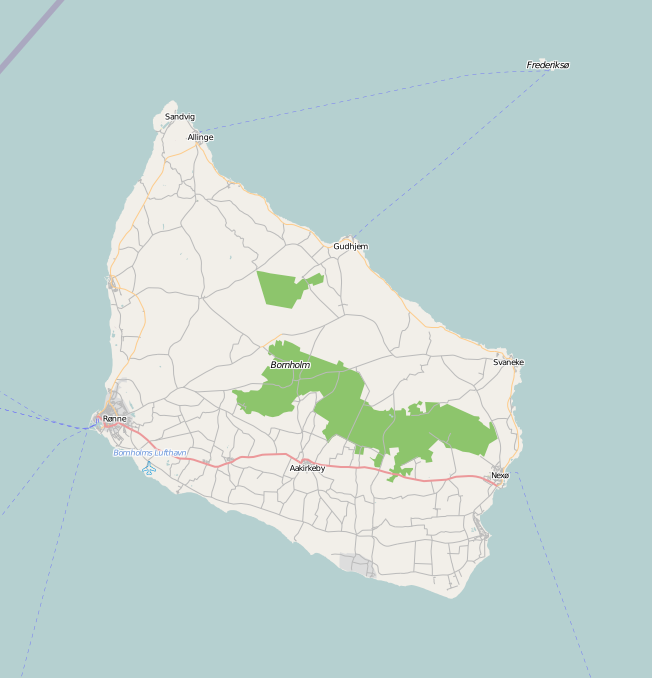
- Location on Bornholm
- Coordinates: 55°03′17″N 14°46′48″E
- Country: Denmark
- Region: Capital (Hovedstaden)
- Municipality: Bornholm

Population (2010)
  - Total: 151
- Time zone: UTC+1 (CET)
  - Summer (DST): UTC+2 (CEST)

Arnager is a small fishing village in Rønne parish, Bornholm island, Denmark. It is approximately 3 kilometres (1.9 mi) southwest of Nylars, about 8 kilometres (5.0 mi) southeast of Rønne, and approximately 3 kilometres (1.9 mi) southeast of Bornholm Airport. Its population in 2010 was 151 residents. Arnager Bay is east of Arnager.

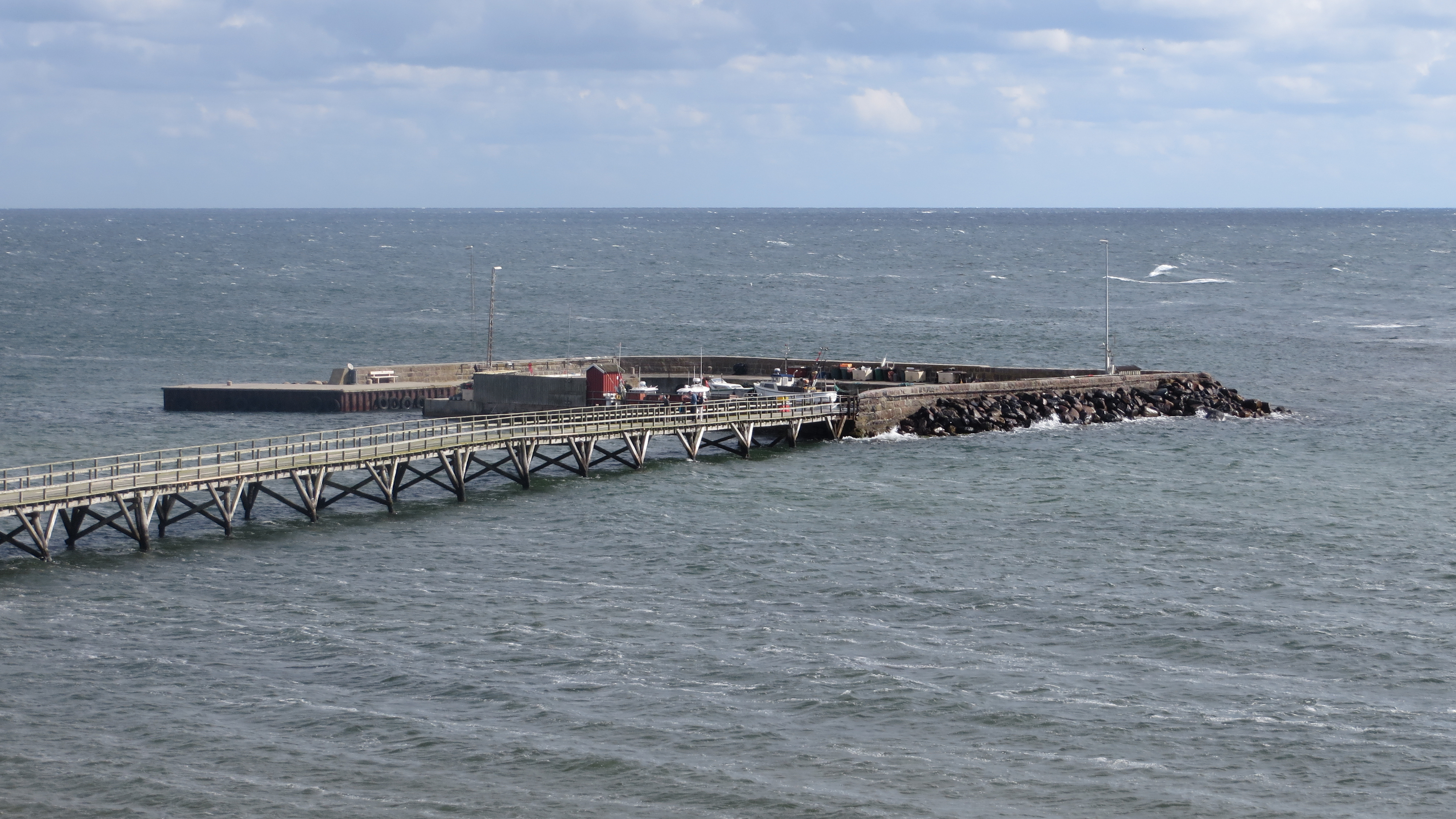
Harbour and pier

According to Bornholm Place Names, Arnager was first mentioned in 1552 as "Arenack" in one of the Chancery letter books. The harbor was built in 1883 by H. Zahrtmann. For some time, the village was one of the main resting places for the island's missionaries. The city is notable for having Scandinavia's longest wooden bridge. The 200 metres (660 ft) structure links the port with the city. In the mid-1990s, dinosaur footprints were identified on a cliff approximately 1 kilometre (0.62 mi) east of the village.
