= Listed =

Listed may refer to:

- Listed, Bornholm, a fishing village on the Danish island of Bornholm
- Listed (MMM program), a television show on MuchMoreMusic
- Endangered species in biology
- Listed building, in architecture, designation of a historically significant structure
- Listed company, see listing (finance), a public company whose shares are traded e.g. on a stock exchange
- UL Listed, a certification mark
- A category of Group races in horse racing

== See also ==
- Listing (disambiguation)
