= Bornholms Erhvervsskole =

Coordinates: 55.1069°N 14.7127°E

Bornholms Erhvervsskole (English: Business and Technical College of Bornholm) is an institution with secondary education on Bornholm, Denmark, responsible for providing education in many areas. It was founded on 1 July 1976. It merged with VUC Bornholm and Bornholm High School (one of Bornholm's two high schools) June 2010 to form a collaboration called Campus Bornholm.
