= Nylars Church =

Church building in Bornholm, Denmark

Coordinates: 55°04′26″N 14°48′53″E

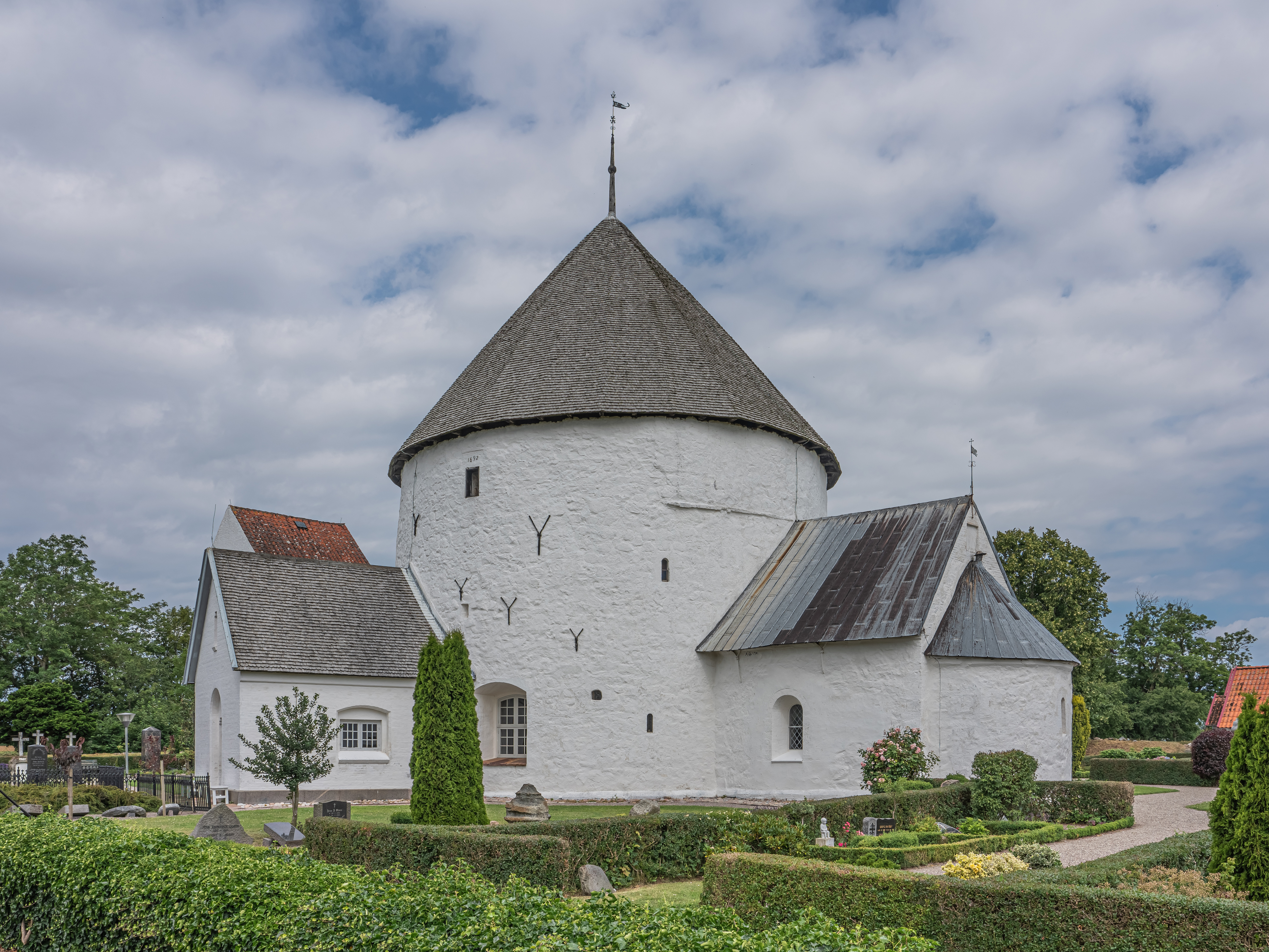
Nylars Church

Nylars Church (Danish: Nylars Kirke) is a 12th-century round church in the village of Nylars near Rønne in the south of the Danish island of Bornholm. Originally designed for a defensive role, the solid structure contains a series of 13th-century frescos, the oldest of Bornholm's four round churches.

== History ==
Built around 1165, the church was dedicated to St Nicholas. The old Danish name for Nicolas was Nilaus which has developed into the present name of Nylars. The three storeys are built of fieldstone and with window and door frames of limestone. The original defensive systems are largely intact. The decorated south door is well-preserved. The porch is from 1879. The church first belonged to the Archbishopric of Lund, then came under the Danish crown at the time of the Reformation. In the 19th century, it became fully independent.

== Exterior ==
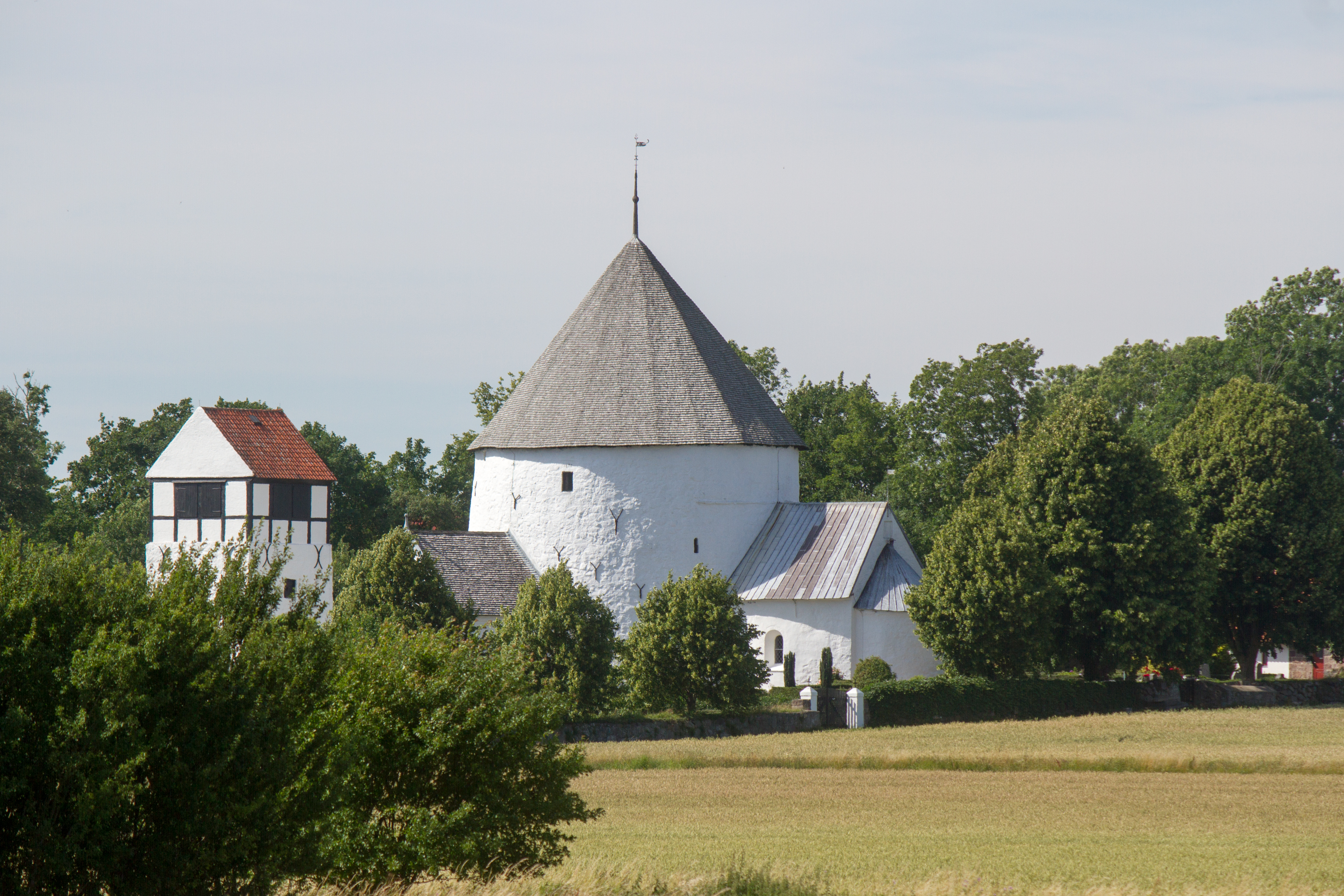
Nylars Church

The three-storey circular structure with a diameter of 11 metres was originally unlimed. The oval-shaped chancel and its apse were constructed at the same time as the nave. Unlike the round churches of Østerlars and Ols whose masonry is supported by buttresses, Nylars is solidly constructed with walls up to 2 metres thick. Originally the church had two doors, one for men and one for women. The northern women's door was first replaced by a window in the 19th century, then completely bricked up in 1973. Measuring only 52 by 27 cm, the small window in the northwest corner behind the stairs up to the gallery is the only completely original Romanesque window in Bornholm's round churches.

The lower section of the separately-standing bell tower was probably once used as an entrance gate. Remains of the west door can still be seen in the west wall. A niche on the upper floor probably contained a door leading to a staircase as at Østerlars. The belfry is a later half-timbered addition. There are two bells: the smaller one is from 1702 and bears the stamp of King Frederik IV while the larger bell was cast on Barnholm in 1882.

== Interior ==
Like the other three round churches on Bornholm, the nave is covered by a ring vault supported by the heavy central pillar built of limestone from Limensgade near Aakirkeby. The apse, lined with limestone flags, has a high half-domed vault in which five holes in the shape of a cross can be seen. They dissimulate clay pots some 20 cm deep which were apparently designed to improve the acoustics. The gallery and pulpit, originally from 1882, were decorated by Poul Høm in 1973 in tones reflecting those of the church's frescos. In 1972, Høm also completed the little stained-glass window depicting a timeglass located behind the pulpit. In 1882, when the whitewash was removed from the interior, a 13th-century fresco frieze was revealed around the top of the central pillar. On a blue background, typical of the period, it depicts scenes from the Creation and the Last Judgment.

The chancel was not used for defence unlike that in Østerlars. The church font, from the late Romanesque period, is sculpted in Gotland limestone. The baptismal bowl from c. 1575 is from the south of Germany. Depicting a man's profile and the inscription Marcus Tullius Cicero, it was probably first used for affluent banquets. The stained-glass window in the apse, the work of Poul Høm, represents the resurrection with a seed developing into a plant. The carpet before the altar, titled Water of Life, is the work of Anne-Lise Kofoed-Hansen (1990).

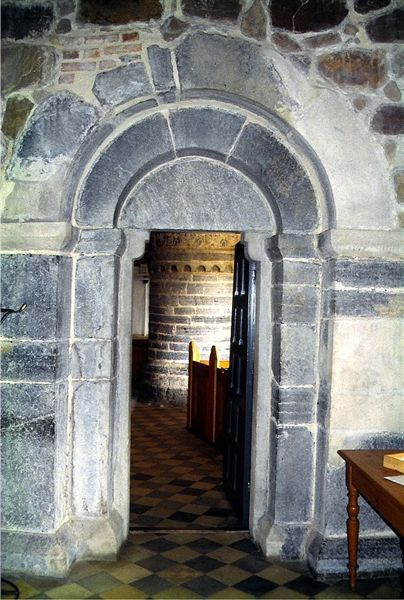
South door

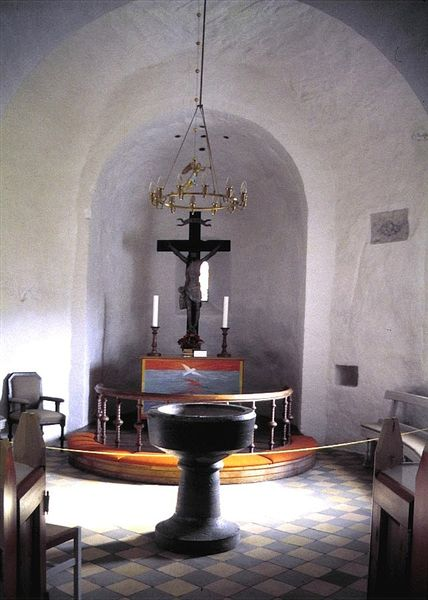
Chancel and apse

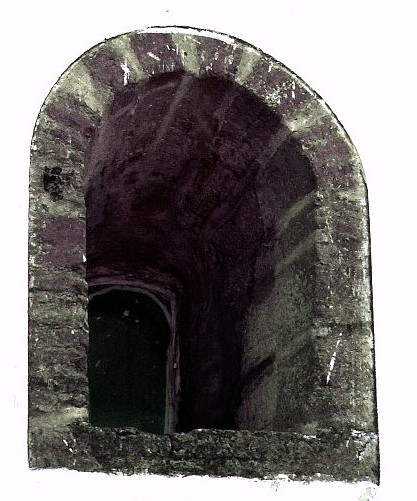
Romanesque window

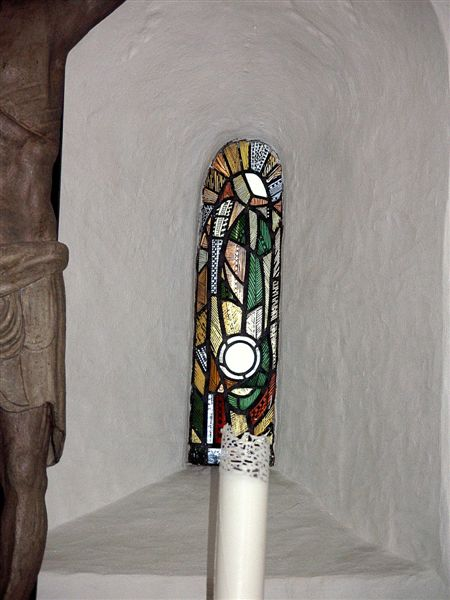
Stained-glass apse window

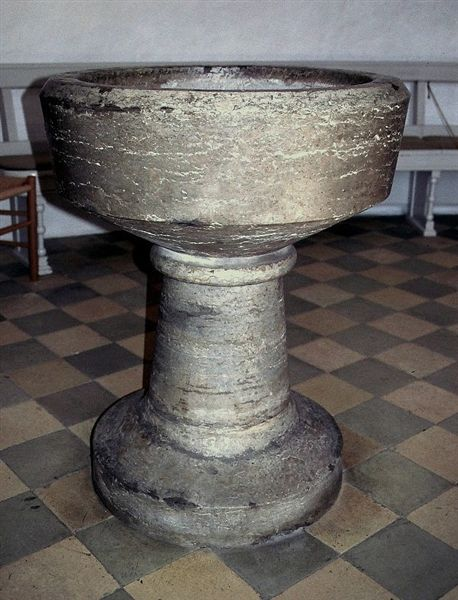
Font

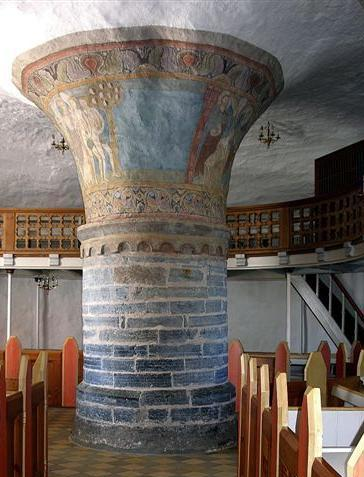
Central pillar

== Frescos ==
In 1882, when the whitewash was removed from the interior, a frieze was revealed around the top of the central pillar with the oldest frescos on Bornholm dating from the 13th century. On a blue background with red and yellow ornamental fringes, typical of the period, it depicts scenes from the Creation and the Fall of Adam and Eve in the Garden of Eden. Originally there were seven images but only six could be preserved.

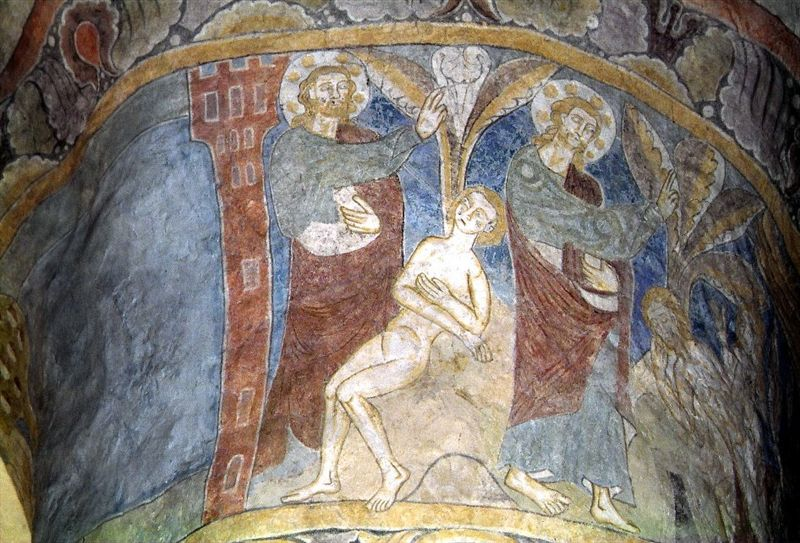
Adam's creation

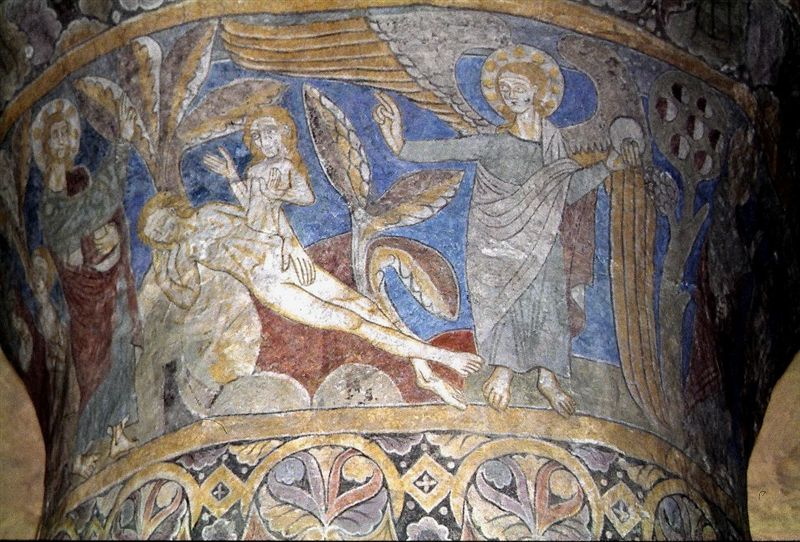
Eve's creation

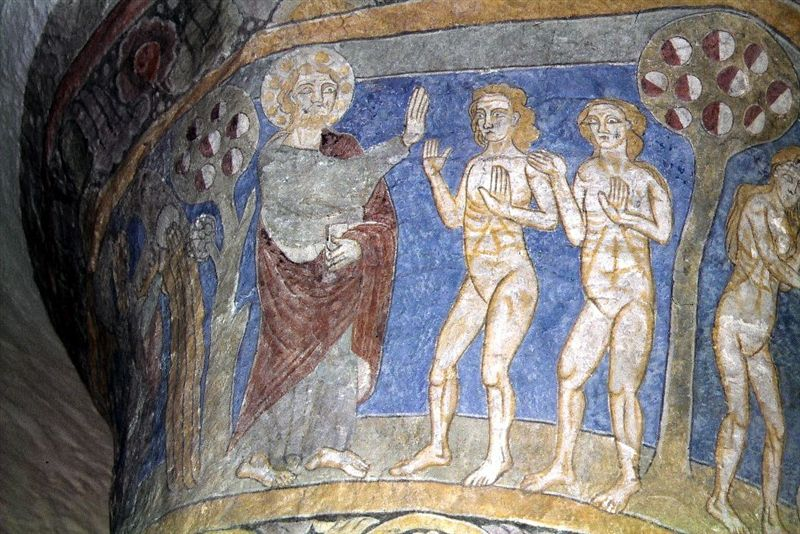
Tree of knowledge

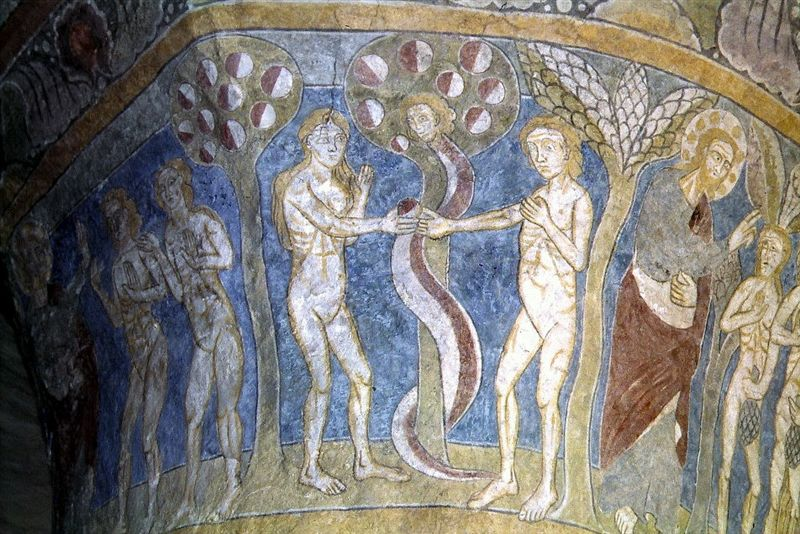
The fall

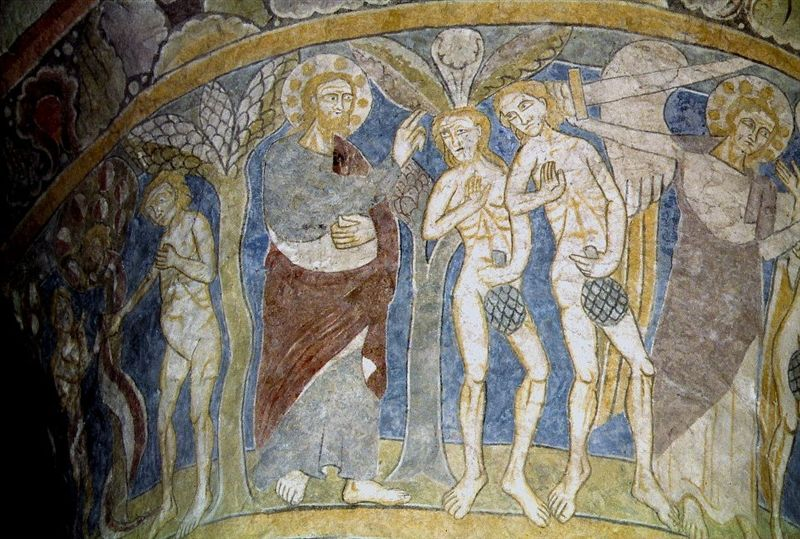
God rebuking Adam and Eve

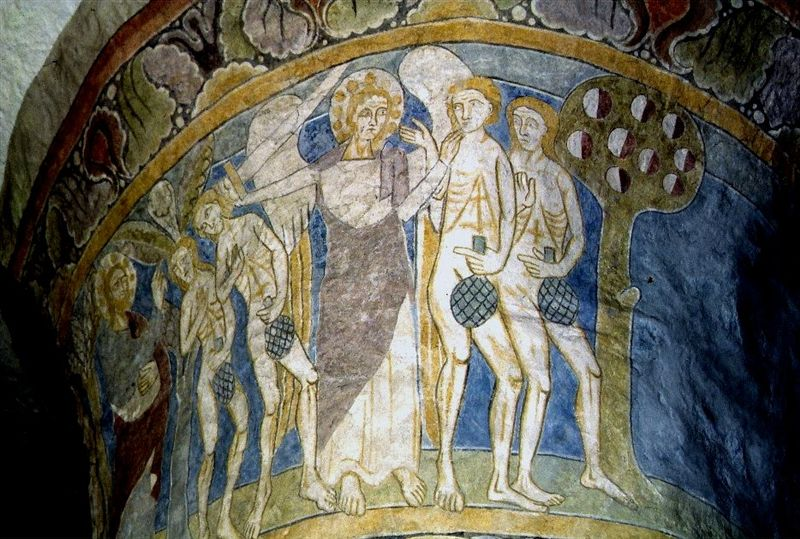
Banishment

== See also ==
- List of churches on Bornholm
- Church frescos in Denmark
