= Lilli Nielsen =

Danish psychologist

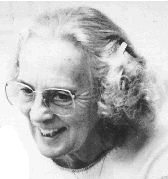
- Born: 21 December 1926; Rønne, Bornholm, Denmark
- Died: 24 June 2013 (aged 86); Kolding, Denmark

Dr. Lilli Nielsen (née Reker; December 21, 1926 – June 24, 2013) was a Danish psychologist in the field of teaching blind children and those with multiple disabilities.

== Biography ==
Nielsen was the second of seven children, four of whom were born blind. When she was seven she was charged with the responsibility of taking care of her blind younger brother.

She was a preschool teacher, then worked in a hospital, became a psychologist, and eventually was hired to teach the blind.

In 1988 she earned a PhD in psychology at the University of Århus.

Lilli Nielsen has worked as special education adviser at Refsnaesskolen, National Institute to Blind and Partially Sighted Children and Youth in Denmark.

She was awarded the Knight Order of the Dannebrog.

Dr. Lilli Nielsen died on the June 24, 2013, at the public hospital of Kolding after a short period of illness (pneumonia).

== Selected publications ==
She was the author of several books.

- Are You Blind? - This book focuses on the adult's interactions when working with children/adults with multiple disabilities. The needs of individuals with autistic-like tendencies or who exhibit self-injurious or aggressive behaviors are specifically addressed. The Five Phases of Educational Treatment are presented in detail - a technique used to build trust and encourage skill attainment.
- Early Learning Step By Step - Parents, educators, and therapists who work with children and adults with multiple special needs will gain an understanding of how all individuals achieve readiness skills for learning. Environmental intervention can facilitate skill attainment through Active Learning equipment and techniques, including learning to move, coordinate hand movement, learning to chew/eat, dress/undress, and play constructively.
- Educational Approaches - This book is a collection of Dr. Nielsen's papers, articles, essays and research ideas. It explains how she expanded the educational approaches for children and infants with vision impairments.
- Functional Scheme - This functional skill assessment and learning reassessment tool was developed by Dr. Nielsen to meet the needs of children and adults who are functioning at a developmental level under 48 months. The purpose of the tool is to create the best possible basis for developing an appropriate learning program for the learner.
- Space and Self - Dr. Nielsen details the meaning of spatial relations as it applies to the development of self-identity. The development and use of the “Little Room” is provided, with particular emphasis on promoting object conceptualization, self-identification and spatial relations in individuals with multiple special needs.
- Spatial Relations in Congenitally Blind Infants - This is Dr. Nielsen's dissertation on her scientific study, which resulted in the design of the "Little Room." The study investigated whether a specially designed environment would facilitate the development of early spatial relations in congenitally blind infants.
- The Comprehending Hand - The ability to grasp is of fundamental importance for a child with special needs to get into contact with his/her surroundings and to enhance the development of the other senses. The book gives practical hints on how to adapt materials and surroundings to stimulate and encourage fine motor skill development.
- The FIELA Curriculum – 730 Learning Environments - Developed by Dr. Nielsen, The Flexible Individual Enriched Level Appropriate Curriculum offers 730 examples of developmentally appropriate activities for children and adults with multiple disabilities. This book is an "appetizer" to the thousands of learning environments and activities a child or adult needs to develop and learn to his potential. (An optional Manual with Moveable Cards provides an instantly usable programming option.)

== Philosophy of Active Learning for Individuals with Visual Impairments ==
The Active Learning approach emphasizes that all individuals learn best by active participation. All activity, especially in the earliest stages of development, actually "wires our brains" and establishes critical foundational concepts and skills necessary for all future learning.

Individuals with multiple disabilities (cerebral palsy, visual impairment, cognitive impairment, autism, hearing impairment, etc.) are at great risk from developing reliance on others to interact with the world around them. They learn to be a passive rather than active participant, waiting for adults to provide activity rather than seeking it out on their own. Children and adults with special needs often develop stereotypical or aggressive behaviors in order to communicate with others or cope within the environments in which they are placed. Active Learning recognizes that every child/adult with special needs is unique. The programming and intervention for facilitating learning must reflect this individuality.

Active Learning emphasizes creating a developmentally appropriate and enriched environment so that children and adults with multiple special needs become active learners.

Dr. Nielsen's Active Learning approach addresses the breakdowns that can occur at the earliest stages of development due to an individual's inability to access the world because of disabilities including visual impairment, cerebral palsy, cognitive disabilities, hearing impairment, autism and other disabilities.

== "Little Room" ==
One of her most famous ideas is that of the "little room." This is a box that is laid over a blind or severely disabled child that has toys and other stimuli hanging from it. The child can then explore and play with the toys. Most will vocalize, even for the first time, due to the superior acoustics of the Little Room. As Nielsen wrote: "The purpose of the 'Little Room' is to facilitate blind children's achievement of spatial relations and reaching behaviour, but it can also be of considerable help for sighted low functioning children."

Child in "Little room"

== "HOPSA-dress" ==
The HOPSA-dress provides vertical orientation, without the need for weightbearing, to children with multiple disabilities. Items with interesting textures can be placed near the feet for tactile stimulation. Later, the pulley system can be adjusted so that the child can bear weight gradually, at their own pace.

HOPSA-dress
