= Stenseby =

- Settlement
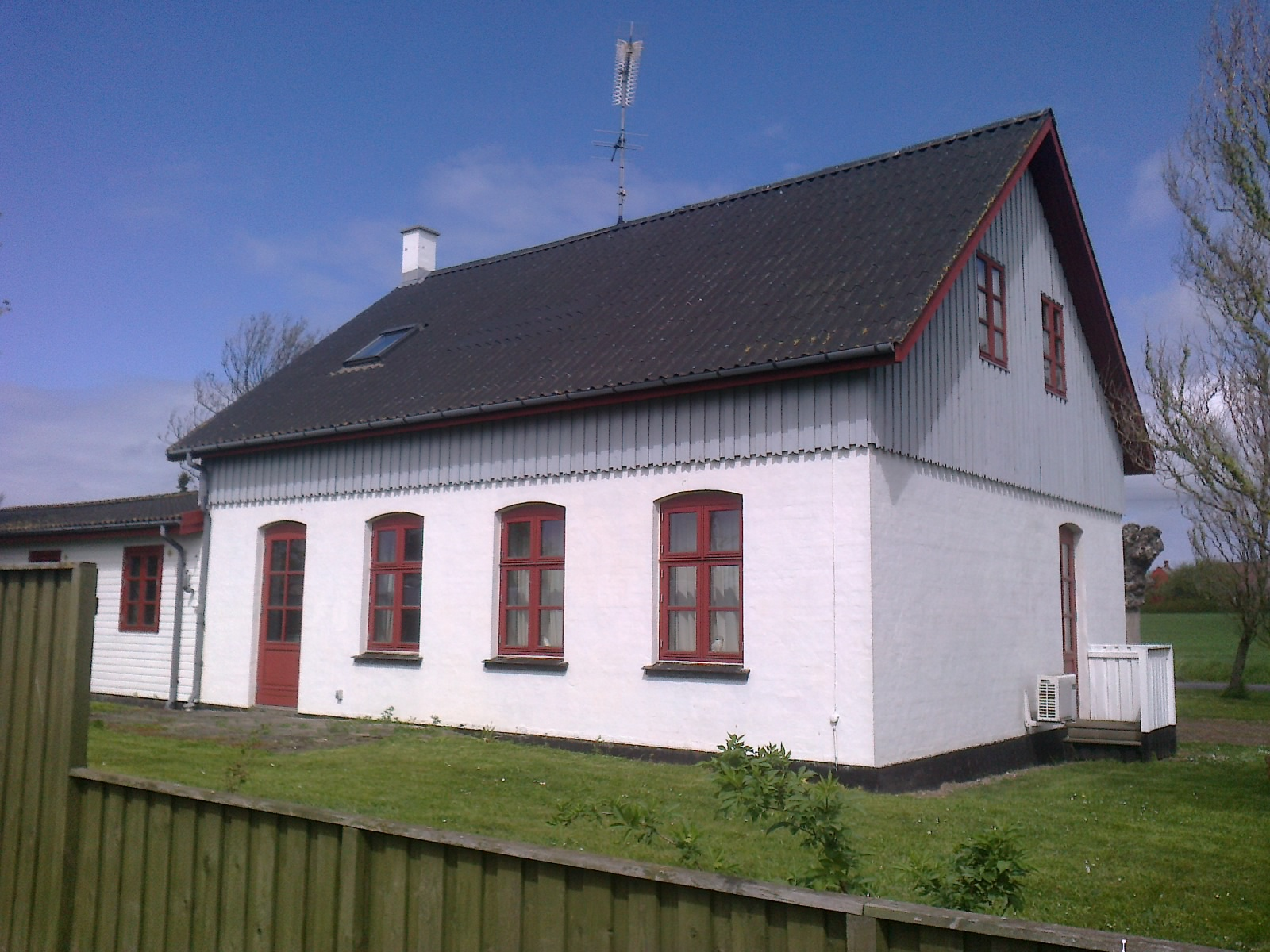
- Bodilsker Station, Stenseby, Bornholm

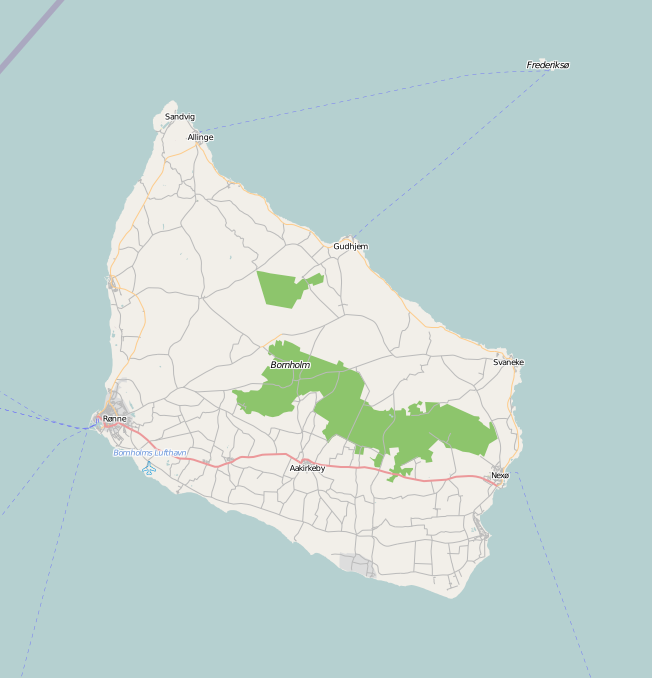
- Location on Bornholm
- Coordinates: 55°02′35″N 15°03′37″E
- Country: Denmark
- Region: Capital (Hovedstaden)
- Municipality: Bornholm
- Time zone: UTC+1 (CET)
  - Summer (DST): UTC+2 (CEST)

Stenseby is a small settlement near St Bodil's Church in the southeast of the Danish island of Bornholm. For a time, an active community grew up around Bodilsker Station on the Rønne–Nexø railway which operated from 1900 to 1968. The area is also known for its passage grave discovered in the 1880s.

== Archeological finds ==
J. A. Jørgensen, a schoolteacher from Ibsker, was Bornholm's most active archeologist in the late 19th century. In 1882, he investigated the Stenseby passage grave from the Neolithic where he discovered a few hundred amber beads, several flint tools, including a 5-inch knife, a sandstone axe and a decorated pot. Not far from Stenseby, he investigated another site, Bønnestenen. Further finds were made in the 1920s including a Bronze Age pot.
