= Listed, Bornholm =

Listed
- Village
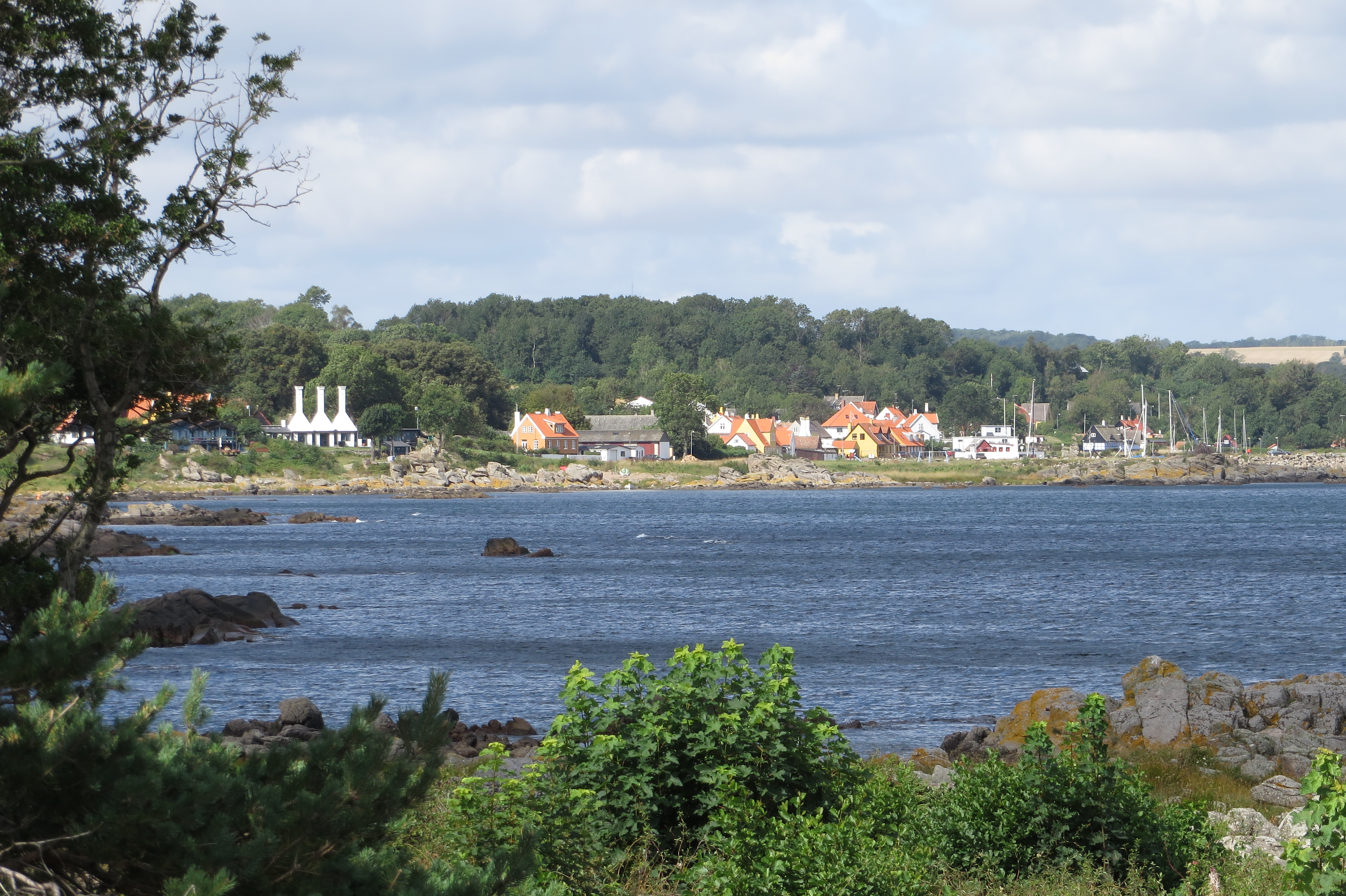
- Listed, Bornholm, from East

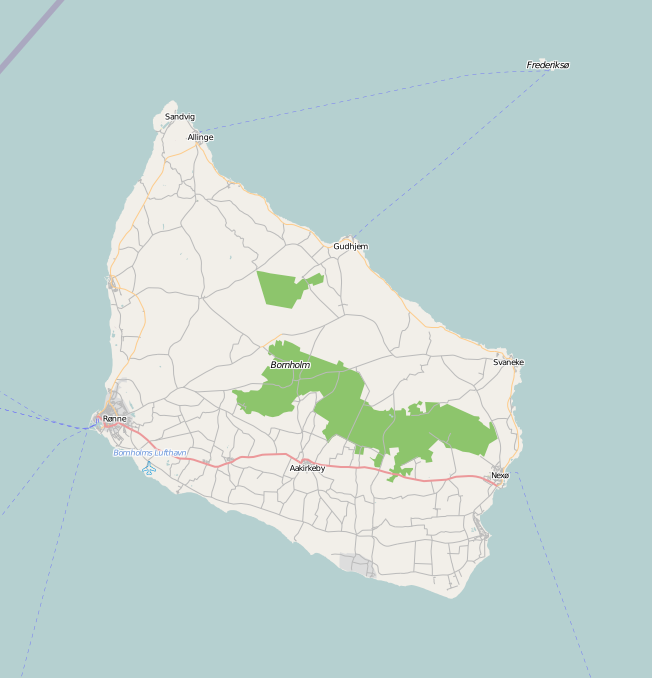
- Location on Bornholm
- Coordinates: 55°08′44″N 15°06′34″E
- Country: Denmark
- Region: Capital (Hovedstaden)
- Municipality: Bornholm

Population (2015)
  - Total: 217
- Time zone: UTC+1 (CET)
  - Summer (DST): UTC+2 (CEST)

Listed is a small fishing village on the Danish island of Bornholm, 2 kilometres (1.2 mi) northwest of Svaneke. As of 2015, it has a population of 217. Fishermen have used the harbour since at least 1379.

== Etymology ==
Listed comes from Old Danish "lista" which meant "strip" or "edge". It denotes the narrow strip of land along the coast below the hills to the south.

== History ==
The place is first documented in 1379 when the Archbishop of Lund encouraged herring fishing by having six fishermen's huts built there. The harbour was first laid out with three basins in the middle of the 19th century. In 1891, a fourth basin was dug out in the rocks to the east of the other three. The harbour was further enlarged in 1982. Over the years, the village has developed combining farming and fishing.

== Today ==
With its rocky coast and old half-timbered houses, Listed is a well preserved village. The paths along the shore lead to woods and streams with views of the waves breaking on the rocks. The harbour accommodates both fishing boats and pleasure craft. The old houses, many of them listed buildings, are packed tightly together along the main road and up little lanes. There is a small sandy beach bordered by low rocky cliffs. In addition to the distinctive chimneys of a number of former smokehouses, there is a little fishing museum which can be visited by arrangement with the keeper.

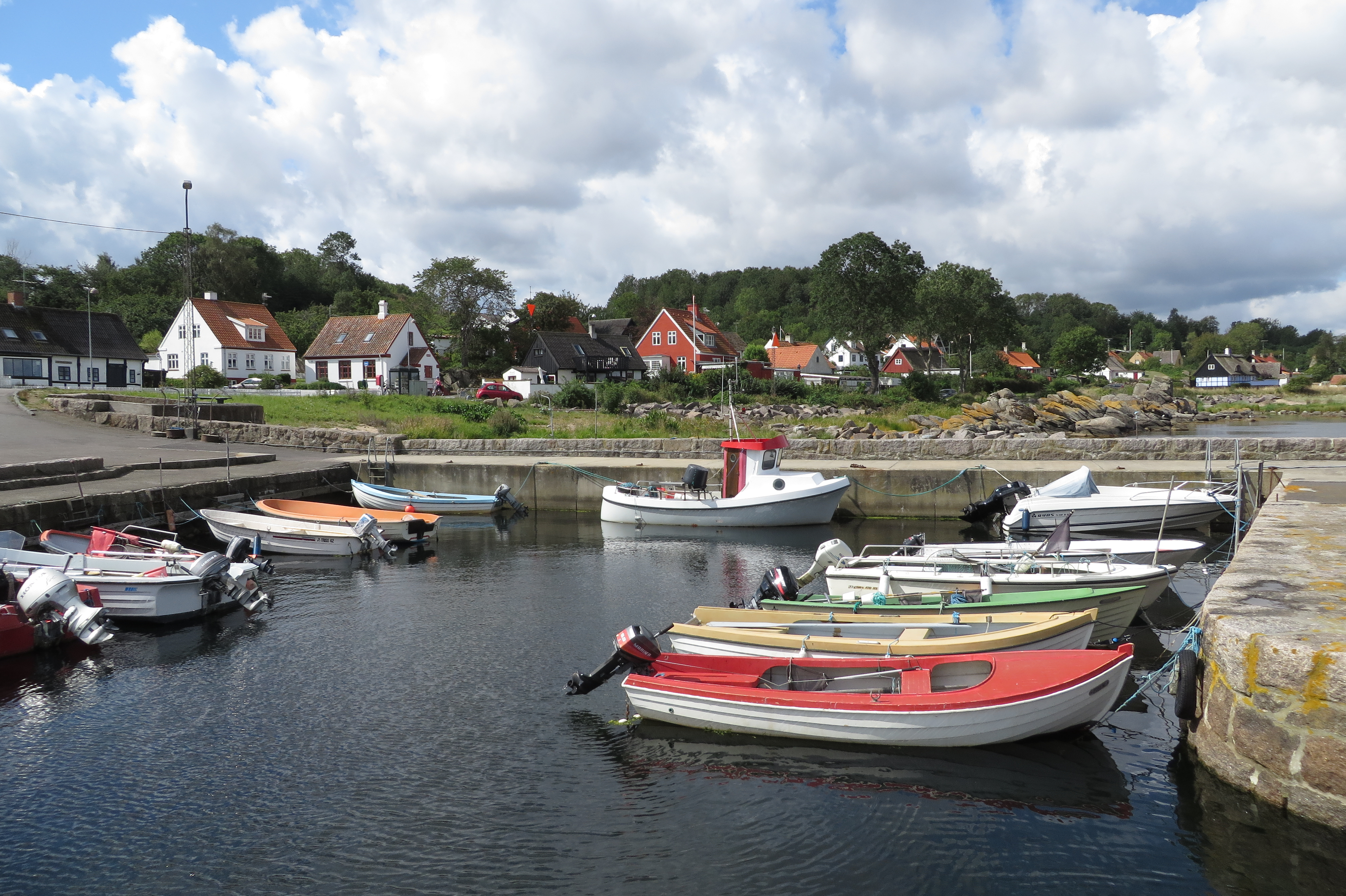
Harbour

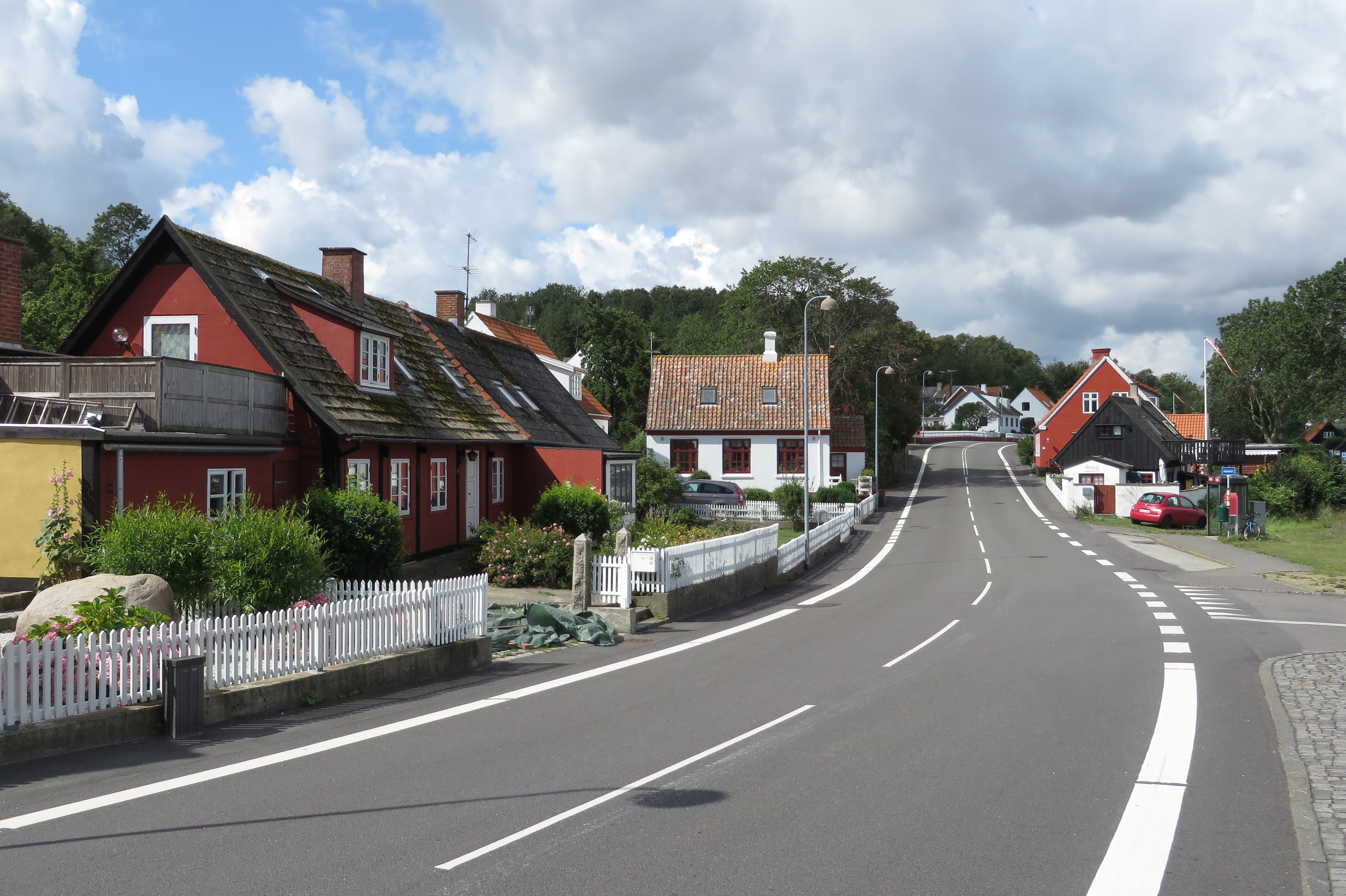
Village center
