= Bornholm =

Danish island in the Baltic Sea

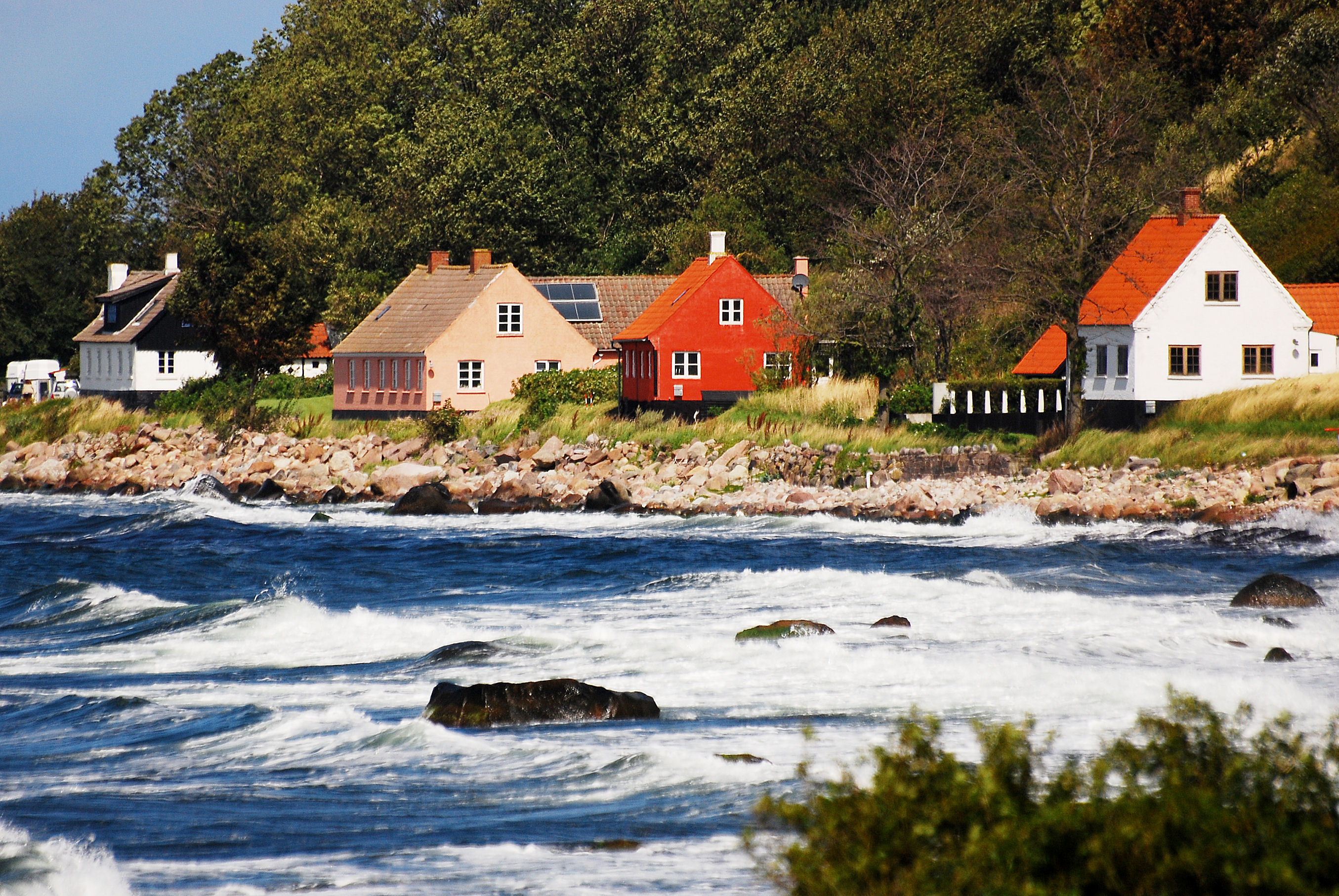

Geography
- Location: Baltic Sea
- Coordinates: 55°8′N 14°55′E
- Area: 588.36 km^{2} (227.17 sq mi)
- Highest elevation: 162 m (531 ft)
- Highest point: Rytterknægten

Administration
- Denmark
- Region: Capital Region
- Municipality: Bornholm
- Largest settlement: Rønne (pop. 13,772 (2020))

Demographics
- Population: 38,677 (January 2026)
- Pop. density: 65.72/km^{2} (170.21/sq mi)

Bornholm (Danish pronunciation: [pɒːnˈhʌlˀm]) is a Danish island in the Baltic Sea, to the east of the rest of Denmark, south of Sweden, northeast of Germany and north of Poland.

Strategically located, Bornholm has been fought over for centuries. It has usually been ruled by Denmark, but also by Sweden and by Lübeck. The ruin of Hammershus, at the northwestern tip of the island, is the largest medieval fortress in northern Europe, testament to the importance of its location. Bornholm and Ertholmene comprise the last remaining Danish territory in Skåneland east of Øresund, having been surrendered to Sweden in 1658, but regained by Denmark in 1660 after a local revolt.

The island is known as solskinsøen ("sunshine island") because of its weather and klippeøen ("rock island") because of its geology, which consists of granite, except along the southern coast. The heat from the summer is stored in the rock formations and the weather is quite warm until October. As a result of the climate, a local variety of the common fig, known as Bornholm's Diamond (Bornholms Diamant) (Ficus carica 'Bornholm'), can grow locally on the island. The island's topography consists of dramatic rock formations in the north (unlike the rest of Denmark, which is mostly gentle rolling hills) sloping down towards pine and deciduous forests (greatly affected by storms in the 1950s), farmland in the middle and sandy beaches in the south.

The island is home to many of Denmark's round churches. Occupying an area of 584.59 square kilometres (225.71 sq mi), the island had a total population of 38,966 as of January 2025.

== History ==
=== Medieval ===
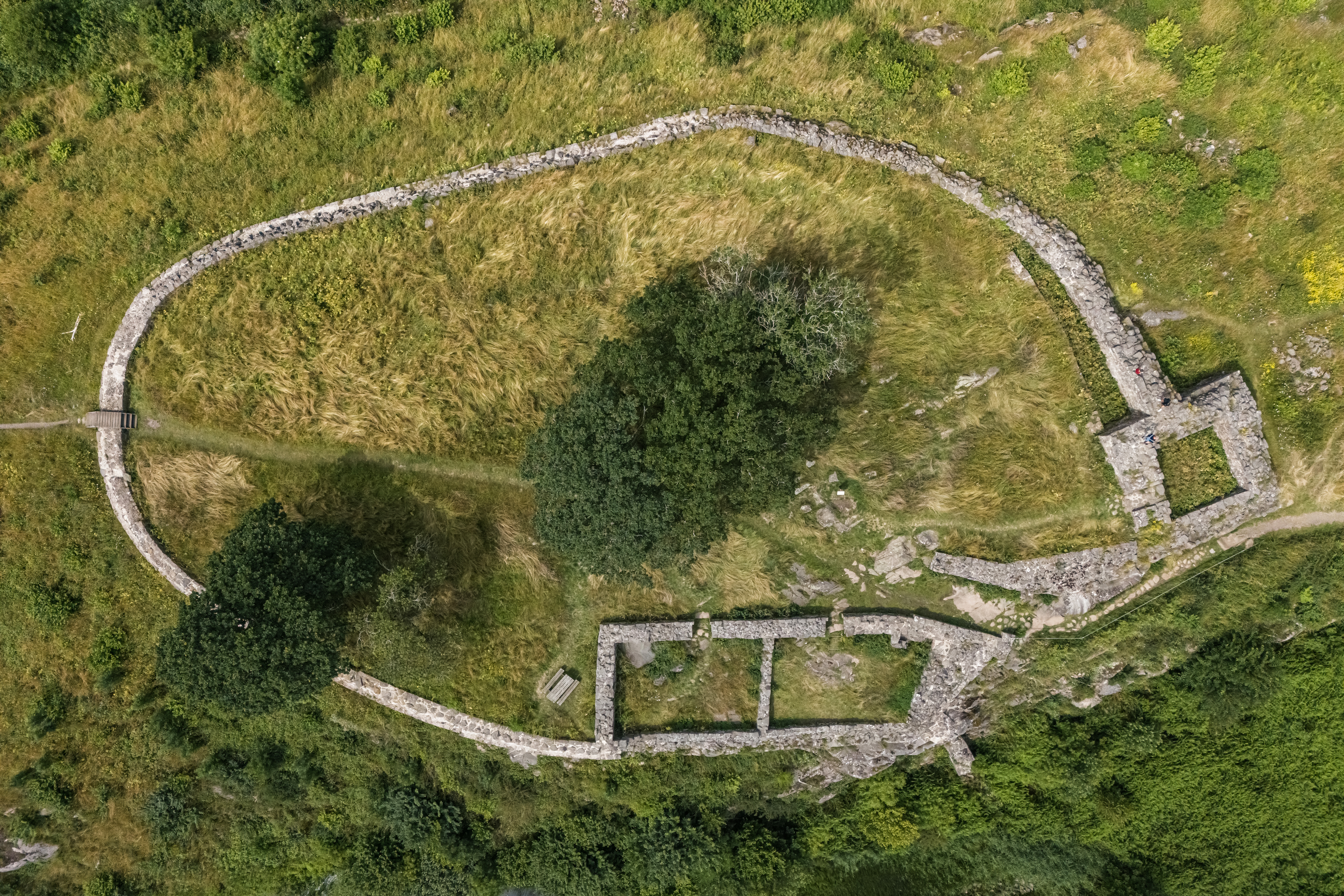
Lilleborg ruin

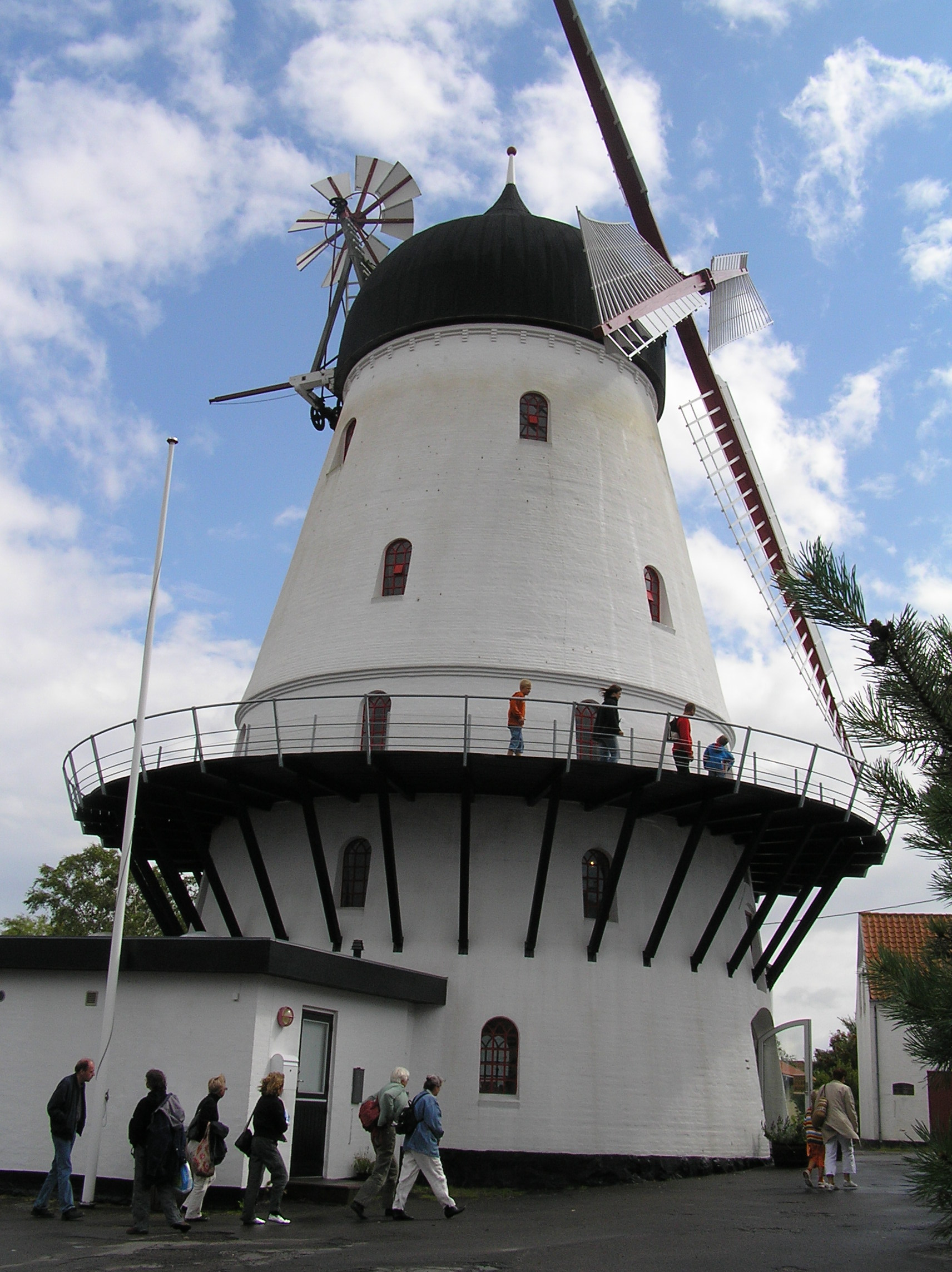
Windmill in Gudhjem

In Old Norse the island was known as Borgundarholmr, and in ancient Danish especially the island's name was Borghandæholm or Burghændæholm; these names were related to Old Norse borg 'height' and bjarg/berg 'mountain, rock' because it is an island that rises high from the sea. Other names known for the island include Burgendaland (9th century), Hulmo / Holmus (Gesta Hammaburgensis ecclesiae pontificum), Burgundehulm (1145), and Borghandæholm (14th century). The Old English translation of Orosius uses the form Burgenda land. There are scholars who believe that the Burgundians are named after Bornholm. The Burgundians were a Germanic people who were settled in the Rhone region by the Romans, and who the region of Burgundy in France is named after.

=== Modern ===
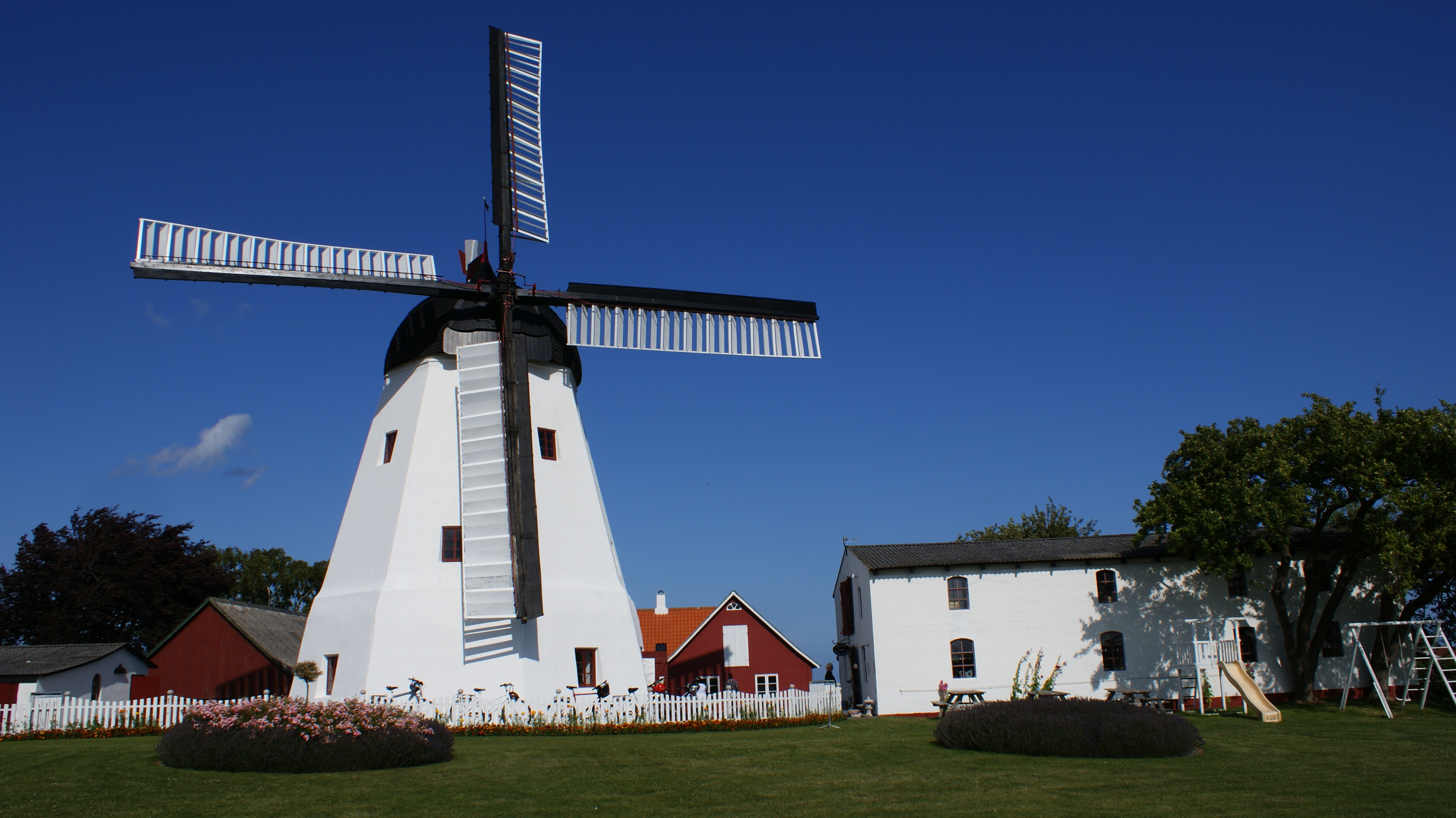
An 1877 windmill at Aarsdale

Bornholm was pawned to Lübeck by Frederick I of Denmark for 50 years starting in 1525, in payment for its support in his acquisition of the Danish throne. Its first militia, Bornholms Milits, was formed in 1624. Swedish forces conquered the island during the Torstenson War in 1645, but returned the island to Denmark in the following peace settlement. After the war in 1658, Denmark ceded the island to Sweden under the Treaty of Roskilde along with the rest of the Skåneland, Bohuslän and Trøndelag, and it was occupied by Swedish forces. A revolt broke out the same year, culminating in Villum Clausen's shooting of the Swedish commander Johan Printzensköld on 8 December 1658. After the revolt, the inhabitants handed back their island to the Danish kings.

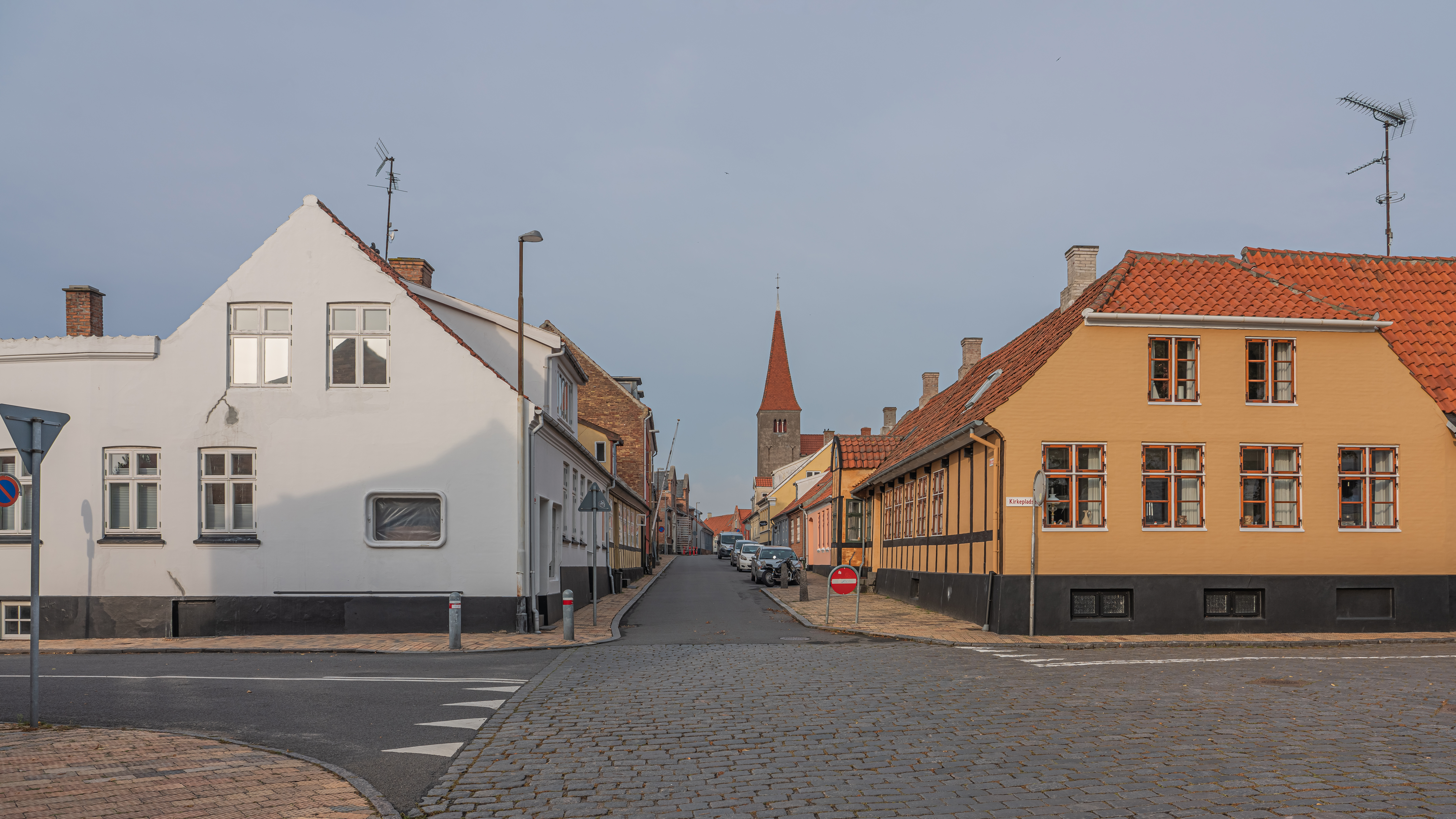
Rønne

Bornholm attracted many famous artists at the beginning of the 20th century, forming a group now known as the Bornholm school of painters. In addition to Oluf Høst, they include Karl Isaksson (1878–1922) from Sweden, and the Danes Edvard Weie (1879–1943), Olaf Rude (1886–1957), Niels Lergaard (1893–1982), and Kræsten Iversen (1886–1955).

=== World War II ===
In the early morning of 9 April 1940, German forces occupied Denmark and began the invasion of Norway (Operation Weserübung).

On 22 August 1942 a V-1 flying bomb crashed on Bornholm during a test – the warhead was a dummy made of concrete. The wreckage was photographed and sketched by the Danish Naval Officer-in-Charge on Bornholm, Lieutenant Commander Hasager Christiansen. When reported to British Intelligence, it was one of the first signs of Germany's aspirations to develop flying bombs and rockets, which were to become known as V-1. The Bornholm rocket turned out to be from Peenemünde.

The Soviet bombing of the two main towns on 7–8 May 1945 prepared the landing of Soviet troops at Bornholm. Danish radio was not allowed to broadcast the news because it was thought it would spoil the liberation festivities in Denmark. 8 May 1945 was the Victory in Europe Day. On 9 May, Soviet troops landed at Bornholm, and after a short fight, the German garrison (about 12,000 strong) surrendered. Soviet forces would leave the island on 5 April 1946.

Later research found that the Soviet bombing of Bornholm resulted in approximately three thousand Danish civilians in Rønne becoming homeless, while damaging a majority of the houses in Nexø, fully destroying roughly one-tenth. Ten Danes were killed and thirty-five wounded, considered a low number, because many civilians were evacuated to shelters on the outskirts of the respective towns before the worst raids hit. It was not until 5 April 1946, that Soviet troops finally left Bornholm. After the war, Bornholm received aid from Sweden to rebuild Rønne and Nexø.

=== Cold War ===
After the evacuation of their forces from Bornholm in 1946, the Soviet Union pressured Denmark not to allow non-Danish NATO troops to garrison the island. The Danish government never formally declared the island off-limits to foreign soldiers, but in practice the request was respected. During the Cold War, the island served as a radar base to monitor East Germany, Poland, and the Soviet Union.

On 5 March 1953, the day of Stalin's death, Polish pilot Franciszek Jarecki defected from the Eastern Bloc and landed a MiG-15 fighter on the island. He was later granted asylum and rewarded for providing Western intelligence with the then-newest Soviet jet fighter.

=== Since 1991 ===
In June 2014, Russian military planes practiced a missile attack on the island according to the Danish intelligence service.

In 2017, Denmark's Defence Intelligence Service decided to build a listening tower near Østermarie, almost 90 meters high, to intercept radio communications across the Baltic Sea and in parts of Russia.

In September 2022, both Nord Stream gas pipelines were damaged by explosives close to the island.

== Municipality ==
Result of referendum 29 May 2001 on merger of municipalities with the county 1 January 2003
Municipality	Yes		No	
Municipality	Votes	Percent	Votes	Percent
Allinge-Gudhjem	3,590	74	1,287	26
Hasle	2,886	70	1,219	30
Nexø	3,218	59	2,252	41
Rønne	7,754	85	1,366	15
Aakirkeby	3,131	74	1,118	26
Total:27821	20,579	74	7,242	26

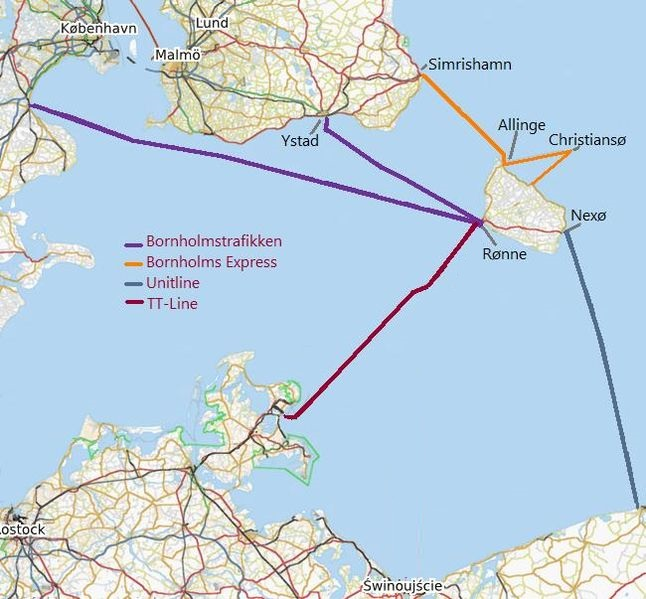
Ferry routes to and from Bornholm

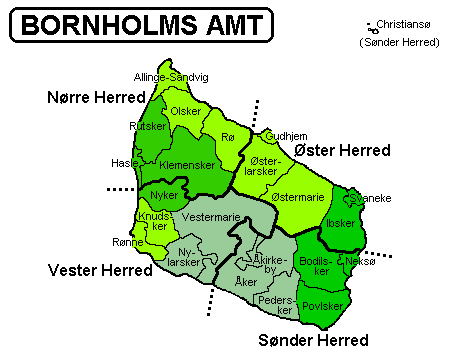
Bornholm and Christiansø hundreds and 5 municipalities (1970–2002) in green colour and 21 municipalities before 1 April 1970

Parishes in Church of Denmark numbered

Unofficial flag of Bornholm (the tourist flag)

Unofficial flag of Bornholm. The Dannebrog is clearly visible with the green cross inserted in the white cross.

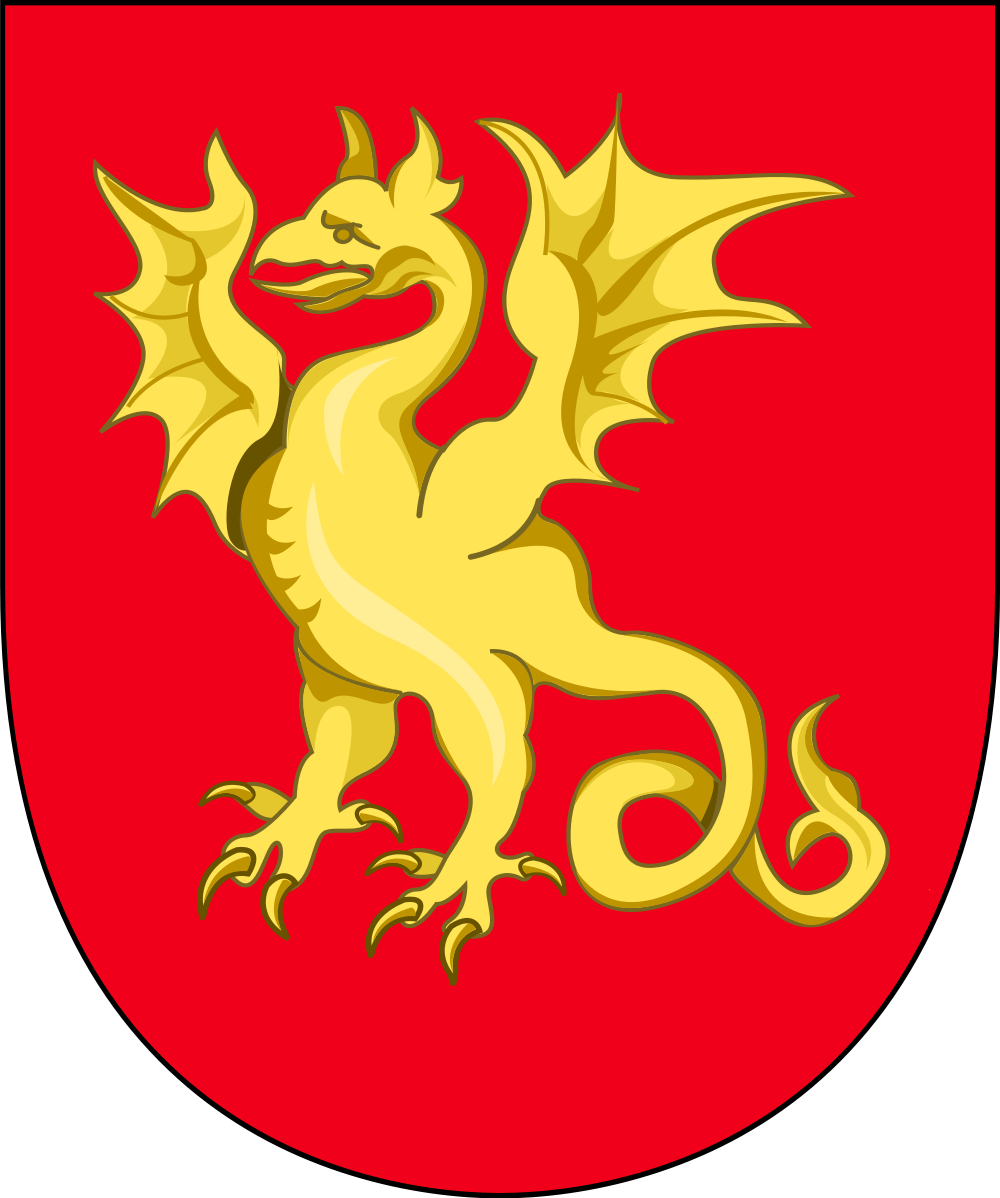
Old coat of arms of Bornholm.

Bornholm Regional Municipality is the local authority (Danish, kommune) covering the entire island. Its formal name is Bornholm Municipality. It is the result of a merger of the five former (1 April 1970 until 2002) municipalities on the island (Allinge-Gudhjem, Hasle, Nexø, Rønne and Aakirkeby) and the former Bornholm County. Bornholm Regional Municipality was also a county in its own right between January 2003 until 31 December 2006. From 1 January 2007 all counties were abolished, and Bornholm became part of the Capital Region of Denmark whose main responsibility is the health service. In the bill (Danish forslag) (Bill of Law on merger of the municipalities of Bornholm) presented 30 January 2002 by the Minister of Interior and Health to Folketinget, it states that "The 1st of January 2003 Bornholm Municipality is established by a merger of (names of municipalities mentioned, and county's name mentioned), and (2nd sentence) Bornholm Municipality is called Bornholm Regional Municipality".

The island had 21 municipalities until March 1970, of which 6 were market towns and 15 parishes. In addition to supervising parish municipalities, which was the responsibility of the counties in all of Denmark, the market town municipalities of Bornholm were supervised by Bornholm County as well and not by the Interior Ministry as was the case in the rest of Denmark. The seat of the municipal council is the island's main town, Rønne. The voters decided to merge the county with the municipalities in a referendum 29 May 2001, effective from 1 January 2003. The question on the ballot was, "Do you want the six municipal entities of Bornholm to be joined to form one municipal entity as of 1 January 2003?" 73.9% voted in favour. The lowest percentage for the merger was in Nexø municipality (966 more people voting "Yes" than "No"), whose mayor, Annelise Molin, a Social Democrat, spoke out against the merger. It was required that each municipality had more "Yes" votes than "No" votes. Otherwise the merger would have to be abandoned altogether. The six municipal entities had up to 122 councillors (of which county clls were 18, from 1998 15), reduced to 89 in the municipalities from the 1990s, in the 1970s and the new regional municipality would have 27 councillors from the start 1 January 2003. They were reduced to 23 from 1 January 2018 (election November 2017). From 1 January 2003 until 31 December 2006 the 27 cllrs were called Regional Council (Danish Regionsråd), from 1 January 2007 changed to Municipal Board (Danish Kommunalbestyrelse) as is the usual term in almost all Danish municipalities. This was to avoid confusion with the Regional Council in Region Hovedstaden, and in the other regions

The merger was approved in a law by the Folketing 19 (and signature by the head of state 25) March 2002, transferring the tasks of the abolished county and old municipalities to the new Bornholm Regional Municipality. The first regional mayor in the first three years from 2003 until 2005 was Thomas Thors (born 28 July 1949), a physician and member of the Social Democrats and previously the last mayor of Rønne Municipality for five years from 1998 until 2002. He became a mayor again in 2021. Bjarne Kristiansen, who was the last mayor of Hasle 2 1/2 years from the summer of 2000 until 2002, representing the local Borgerlisten political party, served as mayor for four years from 1 January 2006 until 2009. From 1 January 2007, Bornholm became a part of the Capital Region of Denmark. From 1 January 2010 until 31 December 2020 the mayor was Winni Grosbøll, a high school teacher and a member of the Social Democrats (Socialdemokratiet) political party. The deputy mayor Morten Riis was mayor for a short interlude from 1 January until 4 January 2021. He is from the Red-Green Alliance. Thomas Thors, who was elected again in 2017, became mayor again from 4 January 2021. After the 2021 Danish local elections Jacob Trøst became mayor from January 2022. He is from the Conservative party. This was after an agreement (aftale om konstituering) between the Red-Green Alliance, amongst whom Morten Riis will be deputy mayor, and the Danish People's Party with the Conservatives.

=== Municipal council ===
Bornholm's municipal council today consists of 23 members, elected every four years. In the first four local elections in the newly created municipality there were 27 members elected to the municipal council. The 2002 local election only took place on Bornholm. From the election in 2017 the number of councillors elected was reduced to 23 members, serving their term of office from 1 January 2018 until 31 December 2021.

Below are the election results to the new merged municipal council beginning with the first election 29 May 2002.

Election	Party												Total seats	Turnout	Elected mayor
Election	A	B	C	F	K	L	O	R	V	W	Ø	Å	Total seats	Turnout	Elected mayor
2002	8			1	1	9			8				27	79.3%	Thomas Thors (A)
2005	7		2	3	1	2	1	5	6				27	78.0%	Bjarne Kristiansen (L)
2009	8	1	1	4	1	3	1		8				27	72.1%	Winni Grosbøll (A); Morten Riis (Ø)(1 – 4 January 2021); Thomas Thors (A)(4 Jan – Dec 2021)
2013	12	1	2		1		2		6	1	2		27	77.1%	Winni Grosbøll (A); Morten Riis (Ø)(1 – 4 January 2021); Thomas Thors (A)(4 Jan – Dec 2021)
2017	8			1	1		4		5	1	2	1	23	75.6%	Winni Grosbøll (A); Morten Riis (Ø)(1 – 4 January 2021); Thomas Thors (A)(4 Jan – Dec 2021)
2021	4		3		1		4		2	2	7		23	72.91%	Jacob Trøst (C)
Data from KMDValg.dk

== Transport ==
Ferry services connect Rønne to Świnoujście (Poland), Sassnitz (Germany), Køge, 45 kilometres (28 miles) by road (34 kilometres or 21 miles as the crow flies) south of Copenhagen, Denmark; the destination to Køge replaced the nighttime route directly to and from Copenhagen (for both cargo and passengers) from 1 October 2004; and catamaran services to Ystad (Sweden). Simrishamn (Sweden) has a ferry connection during the summer. There are also regular catamaran services between Nexø and the Polish ports of Kołobrzeg, Łeba and Ustka. There are direct bus connections Ystad-Copenhagen, coordinated with the catamaran. There are also flights from Bornholm Airport to Copenhagen and other locations.

Because of its remote location Bornholm Regional Municipality has its own traffic company, BAT, and is its own employment region, and also performs other tasks normally carried out by the regions in the rest of Denmark. In some respects the municipality forms a region of its own.

Bornholm Regional Municipality was not merged with other municipalities on 1 January 2007 in the nationwide Municipal Reform of 2007.

== Towns and villages ==
The larger towns on the island are located on the coast and have harbours. There is however one exception, centrally placed Aakirkeby, which was also the name of the municipality from 1970 until 2002, but it included the harbour of Boderne, 5 kilometres (3.1 miles) to the south. The largest town is Rønne; it is the seat, in the southwest on the westernmost point of the island. The other main towns (clockwise around the island) are Hasle, Sandvig, Allinge, Gudhjem, Svaneke and Nexø. Monday morning 22 September 2014 it was documented by Folkeregistret in the municipality that the number of people living in the municipality that day were 39,922, the lowest number in over 100 years.

As of 2018, Statistics Denmark gave the populations as follows:

Rønne	12,887
Nexø	3,644
Aakirkeby	2,083
Hasle	1,622
Allinge-Sandvig	1,489
Svaneke	1,078
Tejn	890

Gudhjem	723
Snogebæk	715
Nyker	701
Klemensker	639
Sorthat-Muleby	519
Østermarie	486
Aarsdale	387

Lobbæk	355
Østerlars	238
Balka	214
Vestermarie	256
Pedersker	242
Nylars	228
Listed	204

The town of Rønne after the merger of the island's administrative entities 1 January 2003 reached a low point of 13,568 inhabitants 1 January 2014. 15,957 people in 1965 (date unknown;number not registerbased) lived in the two parishes that would become Rønne municipality from 1 April 1970. In the table, numbers for Rønne are for the parish of Rønne, Rønne Sogn, alone. The year is unknown but sometime between 2000 and 2005. It does not include Knudsker Sogn, which was also part of Rønne Municipality. Other localities (with approximate populations, not updated) include Aarsballe (86), Arnager (151), Olsker (67), Rutsker (64), Rø (181), Stenseby (?) and Vang (92). In 2010 and 2018 10,297 and 9,111 respectively lived in rural districts, and 88 and 71 had no fixed address. A rural district is defined by Statistics Denmark as a settlement with less than 200 inhabitants.

== Population ==
By 2014, population numbers showed fewer than 40,000 inhabitants on the island for the first time in over 100 years. The Folkeregister in the municipality could document 39,922 inhabitants in the municipality on that date.

Historical population
Year	Pop.	±%
1850	27,927	—
1901	40,677	+45.7%
1916	43,445	+6.8%
1925	45,550	+4.8%
1935	45,819	+0.6%
1945	47,185	+3.0%
1955	48,475	+2.7%
1965	48,620	+0.3%
1976	47,242	−2.8%
1981	47,370	+0.3%
1986	46,919	−1.0%
1990	45,784	−2.4%
1995	44,823	−2.1%
2000	44,238	−1.3%
2005	43,347	−2.0%
2010	41,802	−3.6%
2015	39,842	−4.7%
2020	39,499	−0.9%
2025	38,967	−1.3%
Source: statistikbanken.dk Statistical Yearbook 2009: Area and population. Regions and inhabited islands

== Language ==
Many inhabitants speak the Bornholmsk dialect, which is a dialect of Danish.

== Religion ==
Most inhabitants are members of the Lutheran Church of Denmark (Folkekirken). Various Christian denominations have become established on the island, most during the 19th century.

- Church of Denmark (1536)
- Baptist church (1843)
- The Church of Jesus Christ of Latter-day Saints (LDS Church) (1850)
- Methodist church (1895)
- Jehovah's Witnesses (1897)
- Roman Catholic Church (ca. 1150–1536, 1849)

== Sights and landmarks ==
Geological formations are immediately visible in Bornholm in a way not common elsewhere in Denmark. The still-operated Stubbeløkken and Klippeløkken granite quarries in Knudsker parish just east of central Rønne are among the few remaining of many formerly active quarries on the island. The island's varied geography and seascapes attract visitors to its many beauty spots from the Hammeren promontory in the northwest to the Almindingen forest in the centre and the Dueodde beaches in the southeast. Of special interest are the rocky sea cliffs at Jons Kapel and Helligdomsklipperne, the varied topography of Paradisbakkerne and rift valleys such as Ekkodalen and Døndalen. Furongian (late Cambrian period) sediments of the Alum Shale Formation of Bornholm presented by all six superzones; three agnostoid and fourteen trilobite zones are defined by fossils. 8502 specimens, most of which are disarticulated sclerites, have been collected from these strata. Described gerena include Ctenopyge, Eurycare, Leptoplastus, Olenus, Parabolina, Peltura, Protopeltura, Sphaerophthalmus, Lotagnostus and Triangulopyge.

Bornholm's numerous windmills include the post mill of Egeby and the well-kept Dutch mill at Aarsdale. The lighthouse at Dueodde is Denmark's tallest, while Hammeren Lighthouse stands at a height of 85 metres (279 ft) above sea level and Rønne Lighthouse rises over the waterfront.

Examples of roads that have (very) steep climbs and descents are: (inland) Simblegårdsvej in Klemensker, which begins by the village inn Klemens Kro, and Slamrebjergvej just outside Nexø extending northward from the main road from Rønne. Along the coast there are several steep roads, which is also the case in some parts of Denmark as a whole, for instance in and around Vejle.

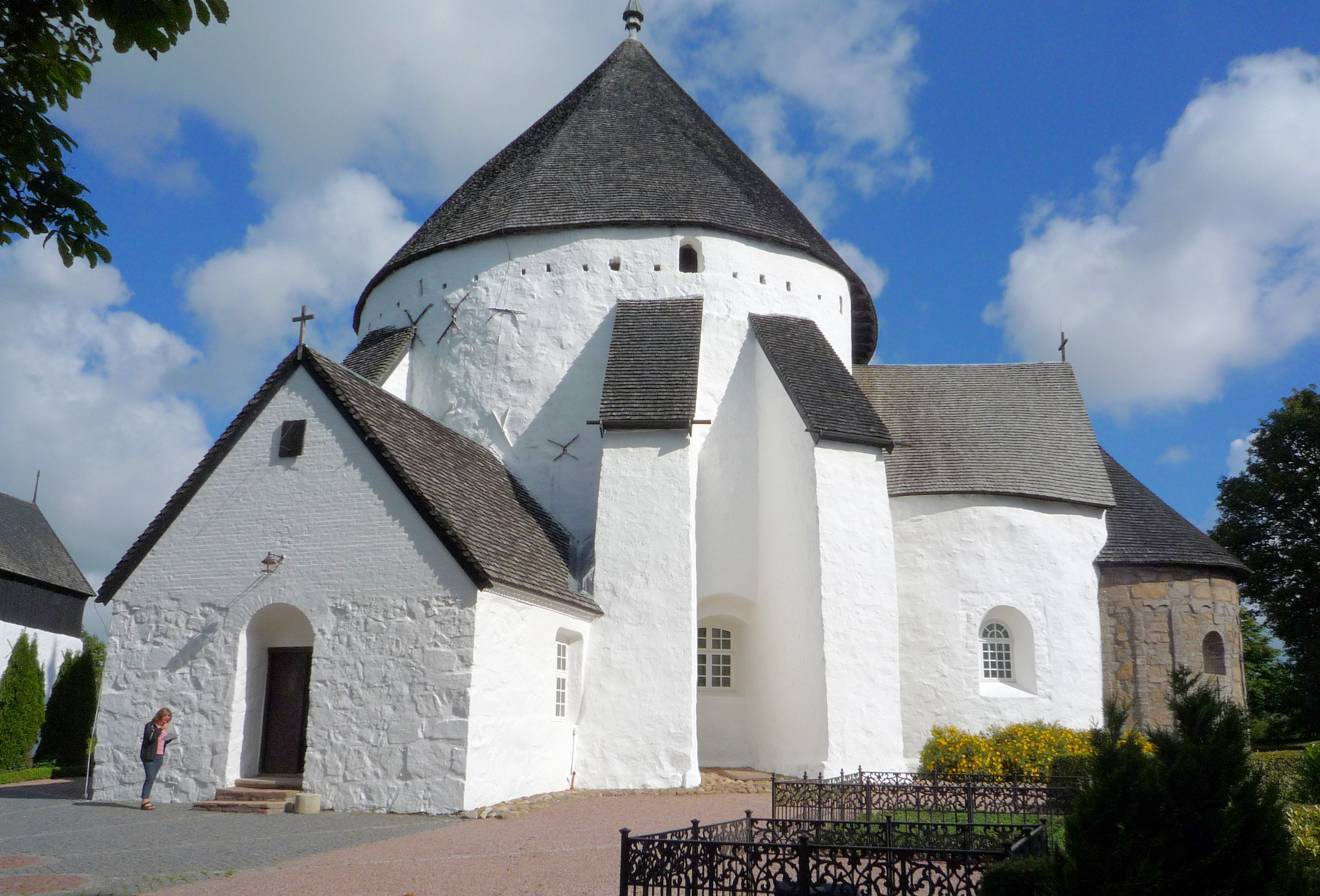
Østerlars Church, one of Bornholm's four round churches

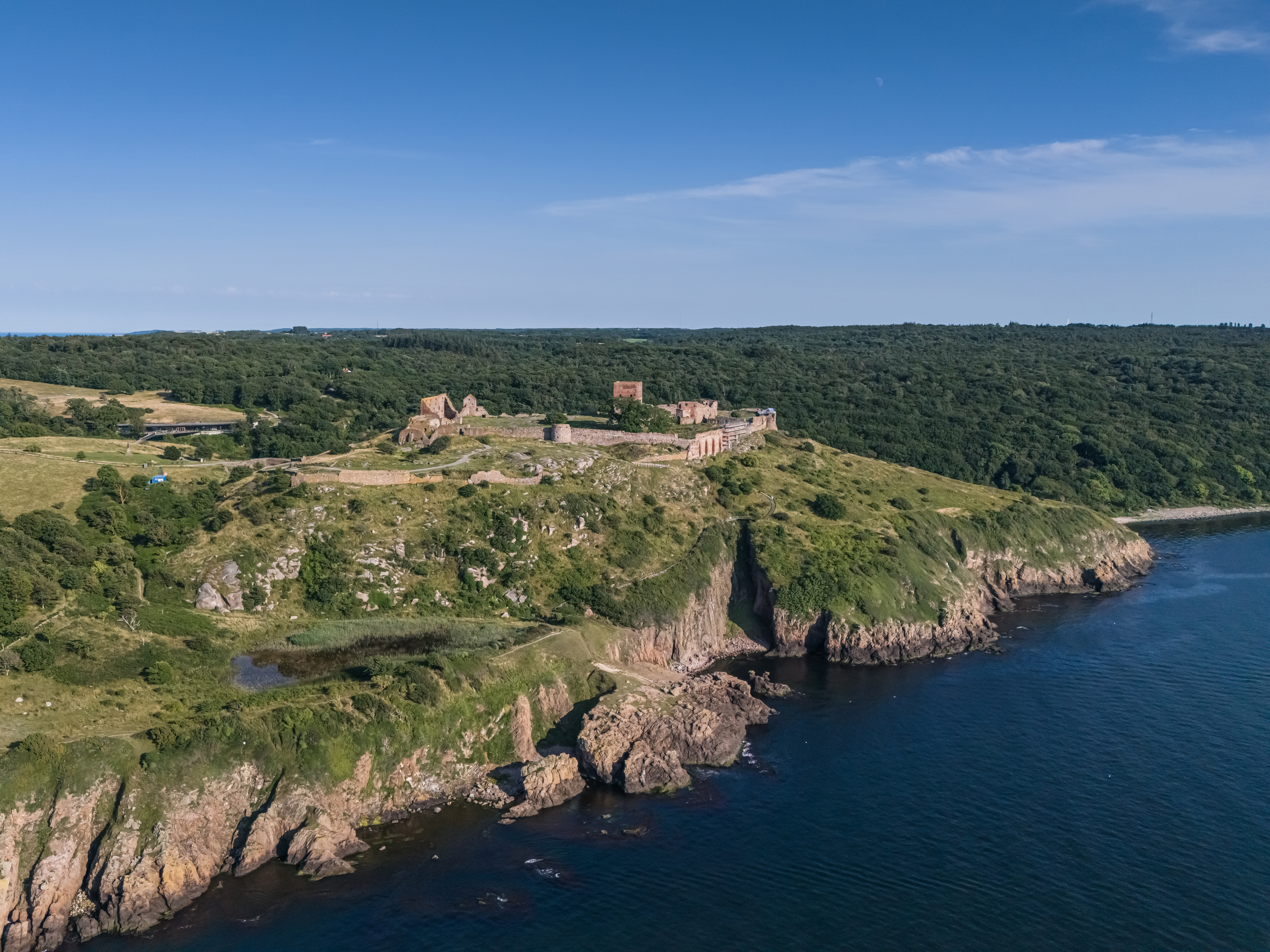
Ruins of Hammershus, a medieval fortress

The island hosts examples of 19th- and early-20th-century architecture, and about 300 wooden houses in Rønne and Nexø, donated by Sweden after World War II, when the island was repairing damage caused by the war. The island is home to 15 medieval churches, four of which are round churches with unique artwork and architecture. The ancient site of Rispebjerg has remains of sun temples from the Neolithic and earthworks from the Iron Age.

There are 14 European bison near Åkirkeby, attracting 100,000 visitors a year.

== Education ==
Because of the dilapidated state of their buildings, all secondary educational facilities in Rønne, including adult evening classes, were transferred to new facilities at Campus Bornholm in 2018. Campus Bornholm is an amalgamation of Bornholms Erhvervsskole (youth and adults), Bornholm High School (youth) and VUC Bornholm (adults). Learning institutions not part of this formalised collaboration will also be housed at Minervavej in Rønne. The building costs were over 300 million DKK (US$46.9 million (29 June 2018)). The A.P. Møller Foundation contributed a sum of 56 million DKK (US$8.76 million (29 June 2018)) to the project.

== Economy ==
Bornholm's economy relies on dairy farming and crafts. Potters use local clay, and glassmakers have worked on the island since the 20th century; pottery itself dates to the early 1800s. About 15 dairy farms keep some 5,500 cows, producing 57–58 million kg of milk a year for the local dairy.

Jensen-Group makes industrial washing and folding machines. Founded in Rønne in 1937 as a dairy-equipment workshop, it still has a factory there. The company is headquartered in Wetteren, Belgium, and is Bornholm's largest private employer, with roughly 600 local staff.

Tourism matters most in summer. In 2025 it created 4,290 full-time jobs and generated 4.6 billion DKK. July alone brings about 40% of overnight stays; Danish tourists make roughly 80% of their bookings in the summer months.

== Electricity supply ==
Bornholm is also home to a large internationally funded demonstration project to test the viability of novel energy market mechanisms to regulate energy networks with a high prevalence of renewables (such as wind turbines and photovoltaics). 50% of the EcoGrid project is EU-funded, with the remainder coming mainly from large corporations.

== Military ==
Almegårds Kaserne on Bornholm is home to the III Reconnaissance Battalion (III/GHR) from the Guard Hussar Regiment.

== Climate ==
Bornholm has an oceanic climate relatively similar to southern Sweden and mainland Denmark, whose summer highs and winter lows are heavily moderated by its maritime and isolated position. Though intense heat is rare, the climate is sunny during summer and rainfall is generally sparse for a climate of this type. The winter of 2010 – 2011 was exceptionally extreme with snow depth reaching at least 146 cm (58 inches) and snowdrifts of six meters (20 feet), the highest in Northern Europe. Military assistance was needed to clear roadways. The DMI estimated the weight of snow to be 100 million tons.

Climate data for Bornholm (1971–2000 normals)
Month	Jan	Feb	Mar	Apr	May	Jun	Jul	Aug	Sep	Oct	Nov	Dec	Year
Record high °C (°F)	8.9 (48.0)	9.7 (49.5)	15.1 (59.2)	26.6 (79.9)	27.2 (81.0)	31.7 (89.1)	31.9 (89.4)	32.0 (89.6)	27.9 (82.2)	20.2 (68.4)	15.7 (60.3)	11.0 (51.8)	32.0 (89.6)
Mean daily maximum °C (°F)	2.7 (36.9)	2.4 (36.3)	4.5 (40.1)	8.9 (48.0)	14.5 (58.1)	17.9 (64.2)	20.1 (68.2)	20.5 (68.9)	16.4 (61.5)	11.9 (53.4)	7.3 (45.1)	4.4 (39.9)	10.9 (51.6)
Daily mean °C (°F)	0.9 (33.6)	0.4 (32.7)	2.1 (35.8)	5.5 (41.9)	10.5 (50.9)	14.3 (57.7)	16.8 (62.2)	17.0 (62.6)	13.4 (56.1)	9.5 (49.1)	5.4 (41.7)	2.6 (36.7)	8.2 (46.8)
Mean daily minimum °C (°F)	−1.1 (30.0)	−1.7 (28.9)	−0.4 (31.3)	2.1 (35.8)	6.6 (43.9)	10.7 (51.3)	13.3 (55.9)	13.4 (56.1)	10.5 (50.9)	6.9 (44.4)	3.2 (37.8)	0.5 (32.9)	5.3 (41.5)
Record low °C (°F)	−15.7 (3.7)	−17.7 (0.1)	−16.1 (3.0)	−7.0 (19.4)	−3.0 (26.6)	−0.2 (31.6)	4.0 (39.2)	5.4 (41.7)	−0.2 (31.6)	−5.7 (21.7)	−10.1 (13.8)	−14.1 (6.6)	−17.7 (0.1)
Average precipitation mm (inches)	40.2 (1.58)	22.8 (0.90)	30.6 (1.20)	30.2 (1.19)	31.9 (1.26)	44.2 (1.74)	47.1 (1.85)	41.4 (1.63)	55.5 (2.19)	50.2 (1.98)	52.1 (2.05)	42.4 (1.67)	488.7 (19.24)
Average precipitation days (≥ 0.1 mm)	16.5	12.9	13.7	11.2	10.0	11.0	10.6	10.8	13.2	14.5	16.7	16.1	157.3
Average snowy days	5.6	5.3	4.0	0.9	0.1	0.0	0.0	0.0	0.0	0.0	1.8	3.4	21.2
Mean monthly sunshine hours	35	53	112	190	284	266	276	252	155	102	46	31	1,809
Source: Danish Meteorological Institute

== Sports ==
Bornholm's geography as an island and moderate climate makes Bornholm an ideal location for sailing and other water-based sports. Bornholm has also become an internationally recognised venue for 'match racing', a sailing sport where two identical yachts are raced in one-on-one events on the water. The Danish Open event was held in Bornholm in September 2010 at the port town of Rønne on the western coast of Bornholm. The five-day Danish Open is a key event in the World Match Racing Tour calendar which is one of only 3 events awarded 'special event' status by the International Sailing Federation. The Tour is the world's leading professional 'match racing' series and features a nine-event calendar which crosses three continents during the series. Points accrued during the Danish Open contribute directly to the World Match Racing Tour championship with the winner of the season finale at the Monsoon Cup in Malaysia claiming the ultimate match racing title ISAF World Match Racing Champion.

There are two small stadiums: Nexø Stadion, in Nexø, where NB Bornholm association football club play; and the slightly larger multi-use stadium Rønne Stadion Nord in Rønne, which serves the Bornholm national football team, multi-section club most well known for athletics IK Viking, and several local football clubs. The DBU Bornholm is the local branch governing football on the island.

== Cultural references ==
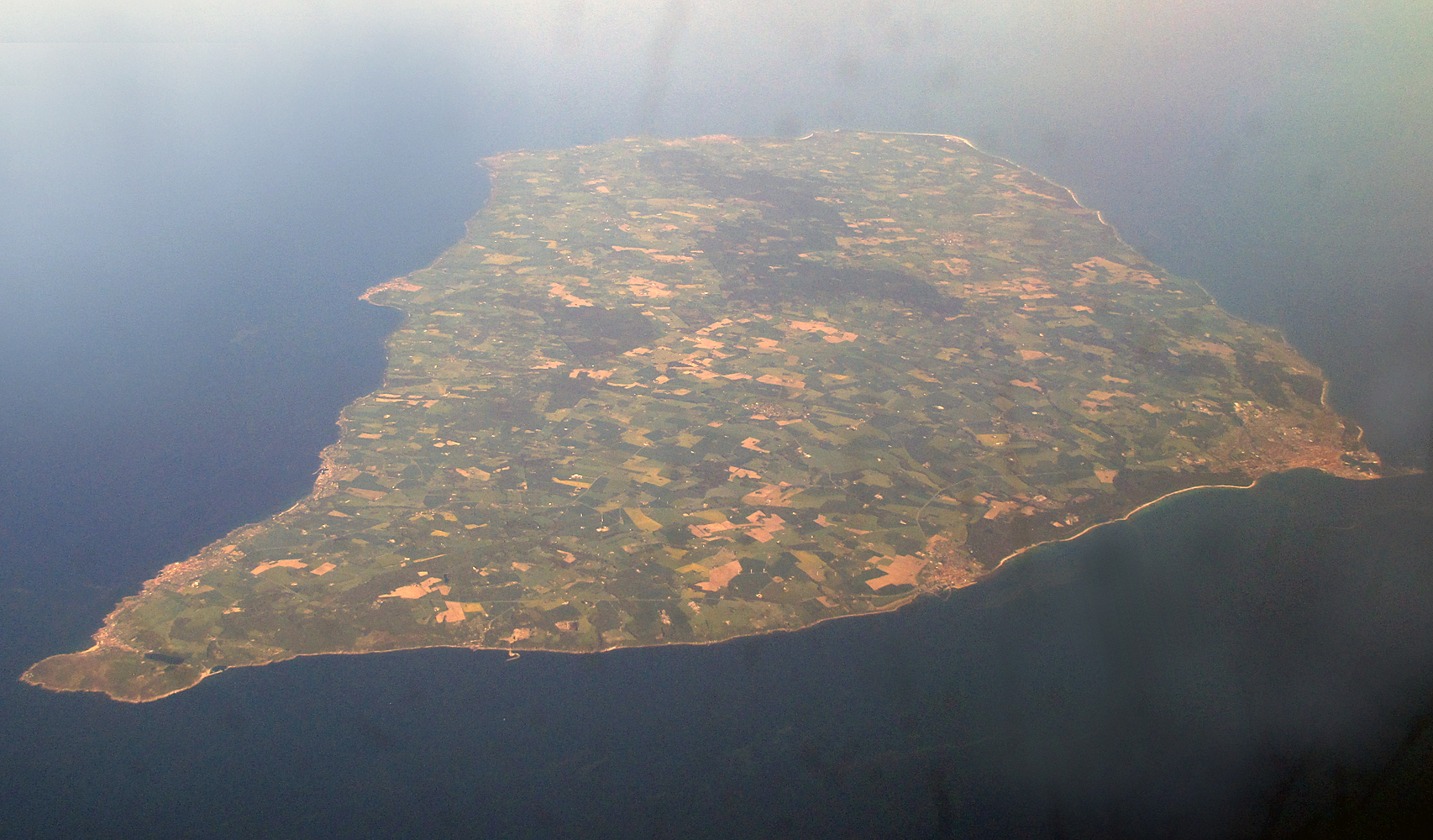
Aerial view of Bornholm

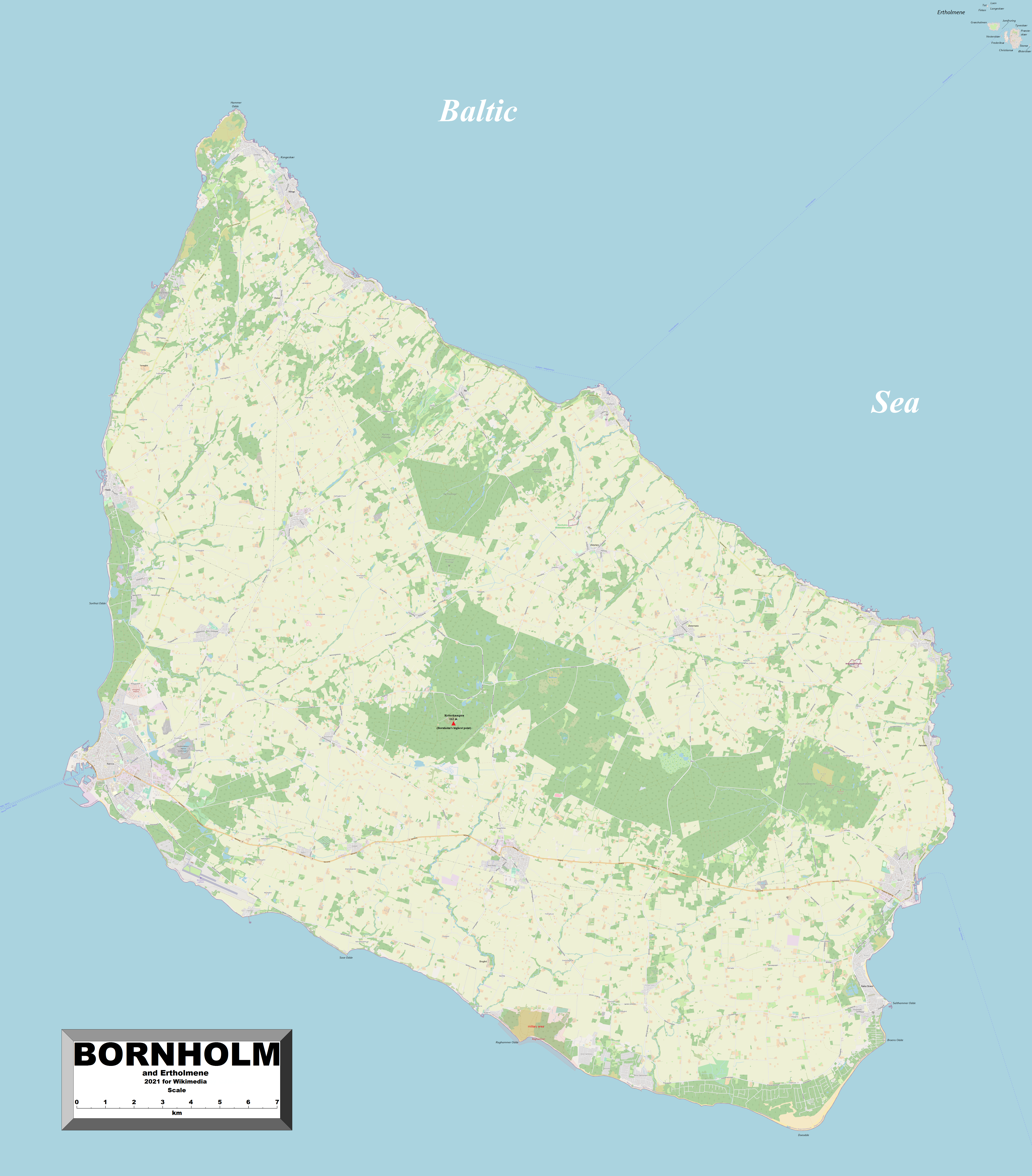
Enlargeable, detailed map of Bornholm

- Russian writer Nikolay Karamzin in his 1794 short story "The Island of Bornholm" ("Ostrov Borngolm") depicts formidable rocks and green meadows of the island. This story about forbidden love is considered one of the first Russian gothic tales.
- The Academy Award-winning 1987 Bille August film Pelle the Conqueror, an adaptation of Martin Andersen Nexø's four volume novel by the same name, is set and was shot on the island.
- A considerable part of the Second World War spy thriller Hornet Flight by Ken Follett takes place on Bornholm, depicting the island under German occupation.
- Megaheavy by Danish filmmaker Fenar Ahmad is set on Bornholm in the 1980s. It won the Grand Prix at the 2010 Odense Film Festival.
- The 2006 film Tempelriddernes Skat (The Lost Treasure of the Knights Templar) takes place on Bornholm.
- Bornholm has an appearance in a Roblox game titled Dynamic Ship Simulator 3, made by CaptainMarcin and his dev team, Badyacht.
- Minor planet 4453 Bornholm is named after the island.
- The 1933 work, Folkeliv og Indstiftelser paa Bornholm, describes the culture and history of the island.
- In the webcomic Stand Still, Stay Silent by Minna Sundberg, Bornholm is the last remaining inhabited area of Denmark after the world is ravaged by a pandemic, and the southernmost area known to still be inhabited by humans.

== Notable residents ==
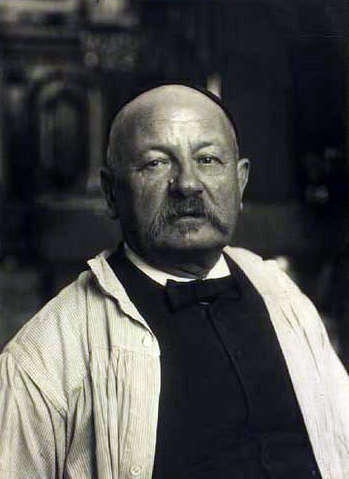
Kristian Zahrtmann

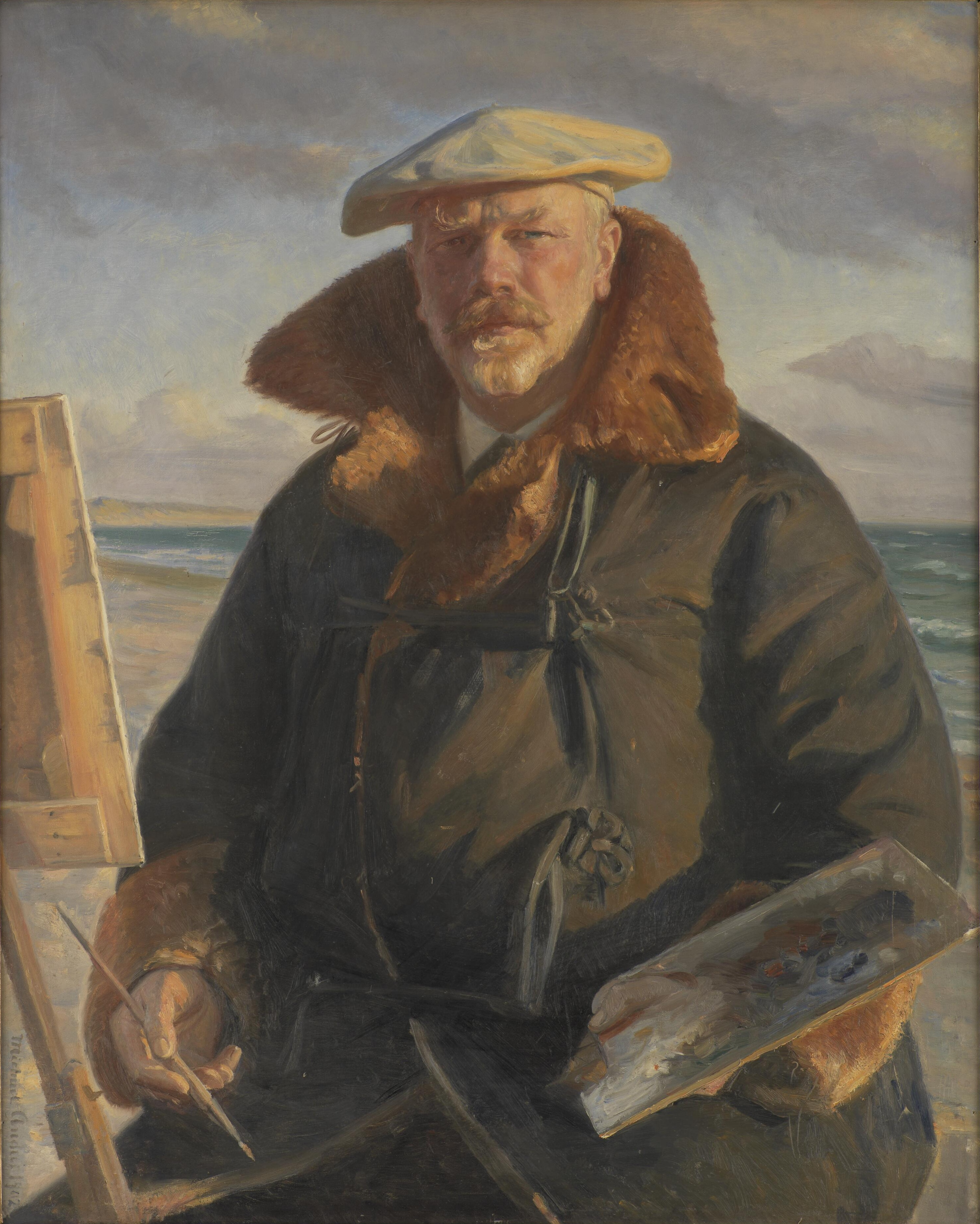
Michael Ancher, self-portrait 1902

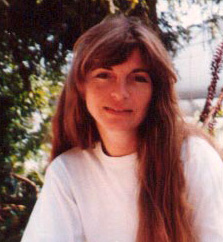
Pia Ranslet

=== Arts ===
- Kristian Zahrtmann (1843 in Rønne – 1917) painter, favoured naturalism and realism
- Michael Ancher (1849 in Rutsker – 1927) realist artist, painted fishermen in Skagen
- Mathias Bidstrup (1852 in Rønne – 1929) architect of many buildings on Bornholm, schools, churches (including Gudhjem Church), train stations and the post office in Rønne
- Hans Henny Jahnn (1894–1959), German playwright, novelist, and organ-builder, lived in Rutsker from 1934 to 1950.
- Janus Laurentius Ridter (1854 in Aakirkeby – 1921) painter and illustrator of topographical watercolours
- Julius Folkmann (1864 in Rønne – 1948) a Danish photographer and cinematographer
- Vilhelm Herold (1865 in Hasle – 1937) operatic tenor, voice teacher, and theatre director
- Oluf Høst (1884 in Svaneke – 1966) Expressionist painter, the only native member of the Bornholm school of painters
- Else Højgaard (1906–1979) ballerina and an actress of stage and screen, noted for her fiery temperament and edgy intensity
- Gustaf Munch-Petersen (1912–1938) writer and painter, moved to Bornholm in 1935
- Gertrud Vasegaard (1913 in Rønne – 2007), a ceramist remembered for her stoneware, in 1933 she moved to Bornholm whence her family originated and opened a studio in Gudhjem.
- Arne Ranslet (1931–2018) sculptor and ceramist, moved to Bornholm in 1955
- Tulla Blomberg Ranslet (born 1928) Norwegian painter, moved to Bornholm in 1955
- Heather Spears (1934–2021), Canadian poet, artist, and novelist, moved to Bornholm in 1962
- Ursula Munch-Petersen (born 1937 in Rønne) ceramist
- Bente Hammer (born 1950) textile artist and fashion designer, moved to Bornholm in 1987, opened a workshop and boutique
- Pia Ranslet (born 1956 in Allinge) painter and sculptor
- Klaus Bondam (born 1963 in Aakirkeby) actor and ex-politician
- Sofie Stougaard (born 1966 in Svaneke) actress
- Jonas Jeberg (born 1975 in Rønne) a songwriter and music producer, lives in Los Angeles
- Engelina Andrina Larsen (born 1978) singer and songwriter
- Aura Dione (born 1985) pop singer and songwriter, resident on Bornholm since age seven
- Astrid Sonne (born 1994) singer-songwriter and violist, born and raised on Bornholm

=== Science ===
- Peder Olsen Walløe (1716–1793) Dano–Norwegian Arctic explorer, explored the former Norse settlements on Greenland
- Peter Schousboe (1766 in Rønne – 1832) botanist and Danish consul general in Tangier
- Johan Nicolai Madvig (1804 in Svaneke – 1886) a Danish philologist and Kultus Minister of Denmark.
- Peter Ludvig Panum (1820 in Rønne – 1885) physiologist and pathologist
- Dr. Lilli Nielsen (1926 in Rønne – 2013) psychologist, taught blind children and those with multiple disabilities

=== Business ===
- Hans Peder Kofoed (1743 in Svaneke – 1812) a Danish brewer, merchant and shipowner traded with Danish West Indies
- M.P. Möller (1854 in Østermarie – 1937), a pipe-organ builder and manufacturer, moved to the United States in 1872
- Christian Schmiegelow (1859 in Rønne – 1949) a Danish businessman, co-founder of Dampskibsselskabet Torm
- Nicolai Nørregaard (born 1979 in Svaneke) chef and restaurateur

=== Public affairs ===
- Jørgen Landt (1751–1804 in Olsker) a Danish priest, botanist and author
- Johan Peter Andreas Anker (1838 in Knudsker Sogn – 1876) a Danish military officer
- Johanne Münter (1844 in Rønne – 1921) a Danish women's rights activist and writer
- Martin Andersen Nexø (1869–1954) socialist writer, moved to the island aged 8 and adopted the city name
- Vilhelm Grønbech (1873 in Allinge – 1948) cultural historian and professor of the history of religion at the University of Copenhagen
- Mogens Glistrup (1926–2008) controversial politician, lawyer and tax protester
- Flemming Kofod-Svendsen (born 1944 in Aakirkeby) an ordained minister in the Lutheran Church and politician
- Lea Wermelin (born 1985 in Rønne) a Danish politician, Minister for the Environment
- Peter Kofod Poulsen (born 1990 in Snogebæk) a Danish politician, MEP since 2019

=== Sport ===
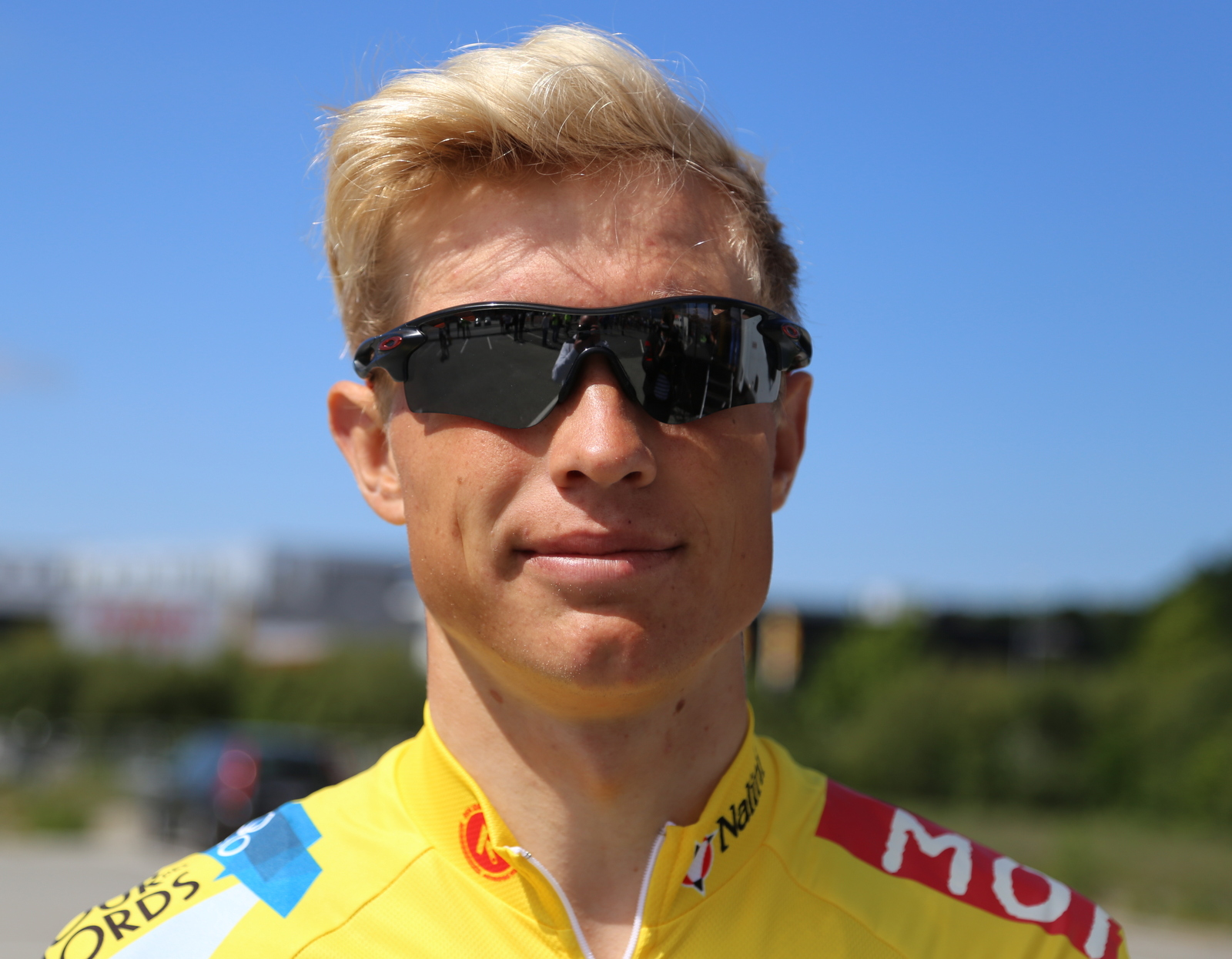
Magnus Cort

- Hans Colberg (1921 in Klemensker – 2007) football player, over 200 pro appearances
- Allan Kuhn (born 1968 in Rønne) a Danish association football coach and former player.
- Julie Houmann (born in Rønne 1979) badminton player
- Lisbet Jakobsen (born 1987 in Nexø) rower, competed at the 2016 Summer Olympics
- Magnus Cort (born 1993) professional road bicycle racer
- Mathias Christiansen (born 1994) badminton player
- Amir Hadžiahmetović (born 1997 in Nexø) a Bosnian professional footballer

== See also ==
- Bornholm disease
- Battle of Bornholm (disambiguation)
- Dromaeosauroides bornholmensis, the first dinosaur found in Denmark
- Arts and Crafts movement
- List of islands of Denmark
