= Nylars =

Village in Bornholm, Denmark

Coordinates: 55°04′21″N 14°48′36″E

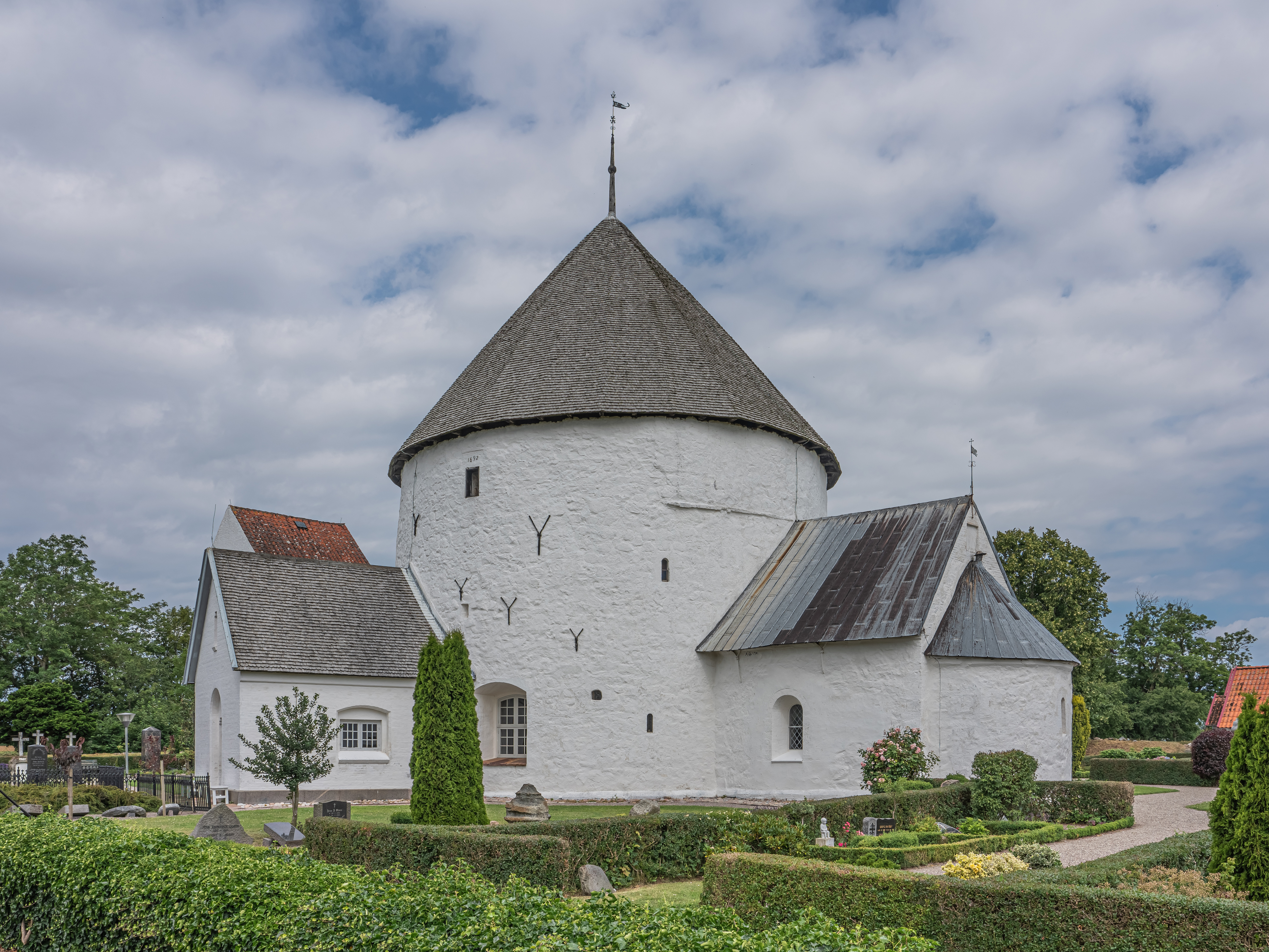
Nylars Church

Nylars is a village in the southwest of the Danish island of Bornholm, 8 km east of Rønne and 8 km west of Aakirkeby. In January 2026 it had a population of 204. It is best known for Nylars Church, the island's second largest round church. The village developed at the beginning of the 20th century as a result of the railway line from Rønne to Nexø. It is located between the discontinued railway to the north and the main road from Rønne to Aarkirkeby to the south.
