= Listed buildings in Bornholm Municipality =

This is a list of listed buildings in Bornholm Municipality, Denmark.

== The list ==
=== 3700 Rønne ===
| Listing name | Image | Location | Coordinates | Description |
|---|---|---|---|---|
| Amtmandsboligen | | Storegade 36, 3700 Rønne | | |
| Amtmandsboligen | | Storegade 36, 3700 Rønne | | |
| Erichsens Gård | | Laksegade 7, 3700 Rønne | | |
| Erichsens Gård | | Laksegade 7, 3700 Rønne | | |
| Etatsrådinde Marie Kofoeds Stiftelse | | Marie Kofoeds V 1, 3700 Rønne | | |
| Havnesmedjen | | Munch Petersens Vej 10, 3700 Rønne | | |
| Hovedvagten | | Søndergade 12, 3700 Rønne | | |
| Johnsens Gård | | Raadhusstræde 2, 3700 Rønne | | |
| Johnsens Gård | | Raadhusstræde 2A, 3700 Rønne | | |
| Karnaphuset | | Østergade 2, 3700 Rønne | | |
| Kastellet | | Arsenalvej 8, 3700 Rønne | | |
| Kastellet | | Arsenalvej 8, 3700 Rønne | | |
| Kastellet | | Arsenalvej 8, 3700 Rønne | | |
| Kastellet | | Arsenalvej 8, 3700 Rønne | | |
| Kommandantboligen | | Storegade 42, 3700 Rønne | | |
| Kommandantboligen | | Storegade 42, 3700 Rønne | | |
| Købmand Rønnes Gård | | Søndergade 14, 3700 Rønne | | |
| Købmand Rønnes Gård | | Søndergade 14, 3700 Rønne | | |
| Købmand Rønnes Gård | | Søndergade 14, 3700 Rønne | | |
| Købmand Rønnes Gård | | Søndergade 14, 3700 Rønne | | |
| L. Hjorts Terracotta Factory | | Krystalgade 5, 3700 Rønne | | |
| L. Hjorts Terracotta Factory | | Krystalgade 5, 3700 Rønne | | |
| L. Hjorts Terracotta Factory | | Krystalgade 5, 3700 Rønne | | |
| L. Hjorts Terracotta Factory | | Krystalgade 5, 3700 Rønne | | |
| L. Hjorts Terracotta Factory | | Krystalgade 5, 3700 Rønne | | |
| Laksegade 5 | | Laksegade 5, 3700 Rønne | | |
| Lybækkerhuset | | Storegade 19, 3700 Rønne | | |
| Rønne Rectory | | Pistolstræde 12, 3700 Rønne | | |
| Rønne Rectory | | Pistolstræde 12, 3700 Rønne | | |
| Rønne Rectory | | Pistolstræde 12, 3700 Rønne | | |
| Rønne Tinghus | | Store Torv 1, 3700 Rønne | | |
| Rønne Theater | | Teaterstræde 2, 3700 Rønne | | |
| Old Town Hall | | Store Torv 1, 3700 Rønne | | |
| Toldbodgade 1 | | Toldbodgade 1A, 3700 Rønne | | |

=== 3720 Aakirkeby ===
| Listing name | Image | Location | Coordinates | Description |
|---|---|---|---|---|
| Christianshøj Halt | | Almindingsvej 40, 3720 Aakirkeby | | |
| Egeby Mølle | | Nexøvej 74A, 3720 Aakirkeby | | |
| Myreagre Mølle | | Nexøvej 26A, 3720 Aakirkeby | | |
| Saksebro Mølle | | Søndre Landevej 55, 3720 Aakirkeby | | |
| Saksebro Mølle | | Søndre Landevej 55, 3720 Aakirkeby | | |
| Saksebro Mølle | | Søndre Landevej 55, 3720 Aakirkeby | | |
| Saksebro Mølle | | Søndre Landevej 55, 3720 Aakirkeby | | |
| Slusegårdens Watermill and Ørredhus | | Strandvejen 10, 3720 Aakirkeby | | |
| Slusegårdens Watermill and Ørredhus | | Strandvejen 10, 3720 Aakirkeby | | |
| Storegade 15 | | Storegade 15, 3720 Aakirkeby | | |

=== 3730 Nexø ===
| Listing name | Image | Location | Coordinates | Description |
|---|---|---|---|---|
| Amtsgården | | Købmagergade 33, 3730 Nexø | | |
| Martin Andersen Nexø's childhood home | | Ferskesøstræde 36, 3730 Nexø | | |
| Martin Andersen Nexø's childhood home | | Ferskesøstræde 36, 3730 Nexø | | |
| Martin Andersen Nexø's childhood home | | Ferskesøstræde 36, 3730 Nexø | | |
| Stenbrudsgården | | Stenbrudsvej 55, 3730 Nexø | | |
| Stenbrudsgården | | Stenbrudsvej 55, 3730 Nexø | | |
| Stenbrudsgården | | Stenbrudsvej 55, 3730 Nexø | | |
| Vangegemmerhuset | | Gl Rønnevej 1A, 3730 Nexø | | |

=== 3740 Svaneke ===
| Listing name | Image | Location | Coordinates | Description |
|---|---|---|---|---|
| Årsdale Mølle | | Gaden 44, 3740 Svaneke | | |
| Borgergade 11 | | Borgergade 11, 3740 Svaneke | | |
| Storegade 28 | | Storegade 28, 3740 Svaneke | | |
| Storegade 28 | | Storegade 28, 3740 Svaneke | | |
| Bechs Mølle | | Møllebakken 13, 3740 Svaneke | | |
| Svaneke water tower | | Dyrlæge Jürgensensgade 1A, 3740 Svaneke | | |
| Svaneke Waterworks | | Hans Thygesensvej 46 A, 3740 Svaneke | | |
| Svanemøllen | | Nørrevang 9C, 3740 Svaneke | | |
| Vagtbodgade 2 | | Vagtbodgade 2, 3740 Svaneke | | |
| Vestergade 1 | | Vestergade 1, 3740 Svaneke | | |
| Vestergade 1 | | Vestergade 1, 3740 Svaneke | | |
| Vestergade 1 | | Vestergade 1, 3740 Svaneke | | |
| Vestergade 1 | | Vestergade 1, 3740 Svaneke | | |
| Vestergade 1 | | Vestergade 1, 3740 Svaneke | | |
| Vestergade 1 | | Vestergade 1, 3740 Svaneke | | |
| Vigebakken 1 | | Vigebakke 1A, 3740 Svaneke | | |
| Vigebakken 1 | | Vigebakke 1A, 3740 Svaneke | | |

=== 3751 Østermarie ===
| Listing name | Image | Location | Coordinates | Description |
|---|---|---|---|---|
| Lille Frigård | | Nybrovej 47, 3751 Østermarie | | |
| Lille Frigård | | Nybrovej 47, 3751 Østermarie | | |
| Lille Frigård | | Nybrovej 47, 3751 Østermarie | | |
| Lille Frigård | | Nybrovej 47, 3751 Østermarie | | |
| Øster Ellebygård | | Ølenevej 8, 3751 Østermarie | | |
| Øster Ellebygård | | Ølenevej 8, 3751 Østermarie | | |
| Øster Ellebygård | | Ølenevej 8, 3751 Østermarie | | |

=== 3760 Gudhjem ===
| Listing name | Image | Location | Coordinates | Description |
|---|---|---|---|---|
| Gudhjem Station | | Stationsvej 1, 3760 Gudhjem | | |
| Melstedgård | | Melstedvej 25, 3760 Gudhjem | | South wing. |
| Melstedgård | | Melstedvej 25, 3760 Gudhjem | | West wing. |
| Melstedgård | | Melstedvej 25, 3760 Gudhjem | | North wing. |
| Melstedgård | | Melstedvej 25, 3760 Gudhjem | | |
| Melstedgård | | Melstedvej 25, 3760 Gudhjem | | |
| Stråhytten, Melsted | | Melsted By 8, 3760 Gudhjem | | |
| Stråhytten, Melsted | | Melsted By 8, 3760 Gudhjem | | |
| Tejn Windmill | | Melstedvej 25M, 3760 Gudhjem | | |
| Østerlars Rectory | | Gudhjemvej 28, 3760 Gudhjem | | |
| Østerlars Rectory | | Gudhjemvej 28, 3760 Gudhjem | | |
| Østerlars Rectory | | Gudhjemvej 28, 3760 Gudhjem | | |
| Østerlars Station | | Nybrovej 33, 3760 Gudhjem | | |
| Østerlars Station | | Nybrovej 33, 3760 Gudhjem | | |
| Østerlars Station | | Nybrovej 33, 3760 Gudhjem | | |

=== 3770 Allinge ===
| Listing name | Image | Location | Coordinates | Description |
|---|---|---|---|---|
| Den gamle Rådstue ved Sandvig Havn | | Strandpromenaden 24, 3770 Allinge | | |
| Missionshuset Menighedshjemmet | | Pilegade 7B, 3770 Allinge | | |
| Missionshuset Menighedshjemmet | | Pilegade 7B, 3770 Allinge | | |

=== 3790 Hasle ===
| Listing name | Image | Location | Coordinates | Description |
|---|---|---|---|---|
| Peter Nielsen's Smokehouse | | Søndre Bæk 18, 3790 Hasle | | |
| Peter Nielsen's Smokehouse | | Søndre Bæk 18, 3790 Hasle | | |
| Peter Nielsen's Smokehouse | | Søndre Bæk 18, 3790 Hasle | | |
| Vang Watermill | | Vandmøllevej 8, 3790 Hasle | | |
