= 2021 Bornholm municipal election =

← 2017	16 November 2021	2025 →

All 23 seats to the Bornholm Municipal Council 12 seats needed for a majority
- Turnout: 23,960 (72.9%) ▼2.7pp
	First party	Second party	Third party
	Ø	A	O
Party	Red–Green Alliance	Social Democrats	Danish People's Party
Last election	2 seats, 6.3%	8 seats, 34.2%	4 seats, 15.7%
Seats won	7	4	4
Seat change	▲5	▼4	0
Popular vote	5,420	3,616	3,597
Percentage	23.1%	15.4%	15.3%
Swing	▲16.8%	▼18.8%	▼0.4%
	Fourth party	Fifth party	Sixth party
	C	W	V
Party	Conservatives	Bornholmerlisten	Venstre
Last election	0 seats, 0.8%	1 seat, 5.8%	5 seats, 18.6%
Seats won	3	2	2
Seat change	▲3	▲1	▼3
Popular vote	2,896	2,623	2,245
Percentage	12.3%	11.2%	9.6%
Swing	▲11.5%	▲5.4%	▼9.0%
	Seventh party	Eighth party	Ninth party
	K	F	Å
Party	Christian Democrats	Green Left	The Alternative
Last election	1 seat, 4.2%	1 seat, 3.5%	1 seat, 6.0%
Seats won	1	0	0
Seat change	0	▼1	▼1
Popular vote	985	682	414
Percentage	4.2%	2.9%	1.8%
Swing	0.0%	▼0.6%	▼4.2%
Mayor before election
Thomas Thors
Social Democrats (Note: Winnie Grosbøll became mayor following the 2017 election, but stepped down in 2020)
Mayor after election
Jacob Trøst
Conservatives

Ever since 2003, the Social Democrats had held the mayor's position in Bornholm Regional Municipality.

Following the 2017 election, Winnie Grosbøll from the Social Democrats had won the mayor's position.

In 2020, she accepted a new job as CEO of Friluftsrådet, and announced that she would step down as mayor from 2021. This would result in Thomas Thors making a comeback as mayor, a position he held from 2003 to 2005.

In September 2021, an opinion poll suggested that the Red–Green Alliance could challenge the Social Democrats in becoming the largest party. Later in October, they would even lead an opinion poll. It was speculated that the Red–Green Alliance had managed to win sympathy, after arguing that the money for the Social Democrats's project of a new town hall, could be spend better on funds for vulnerable young people, and club offers for kids around the 7–9 years.

In the election result, the Social Democrats would lose 4 seats, and see their worst election result in the municipality. The Red–Green Alliance would manage to receive the most votes and seats. However it would be from Jacob Trøst from the Conservatives who would become the new mayor. This was following an agreement between the Conservatives, the Christian Democrats, Danish People's Party and the Red–Green Alliance.

In total, the Social Democrats and Venstre won 6 seats, a decrease of 7. They were the parties who had made the plans to build a new town hall, and this might have played a big factor.

== Electoral system ==
For elections to Danish municipalities, a number varying from 9 to 31 are chosen to be elected to the municipal council. The seats are then allocated using the D'Hondt method and a closed list proportional representation. Bornholm Municipality had 23 seats in 2021

Unlike in Danish General Elections, in elections to municipal councils, electoral alliances are allowed.

== Electoral alliances ==
=== Electoral Alliance 1 ===
Party		Political alignment
B	Social Liberals	Centre to Centre-left
C	Conservatives	Centre-right
K	Christian Democrats	Centre to Centre-right

=== Electoral Alliance 2 ===
Party		Political alignment
F	Green Left	Centre-left to Left-wing
G	Vegan Party	Single-issue
Ø	Red–Green Alliance	Left-wing to Far-Left
Å	The Alternative	Centre-left to Left-wing

=== Electoral Alliance 3 ===
Party		Political alignment
D	New Right	Right-wing to Far-right
L	Lavere skatter og afgifter	Local politics
V	Venstre	Centre-right

=== Electoral Alliance 4 ===
Party		Political alignment
O	Danish People's Party	Right-wing to Far-right
W	Bornholmlisten	Local politics

== Results by polling station ==
L = Lavere skatter og afgifter

Division	A	B	C	D	F	G	K	L	O	V	W	Ø	Å
Division	%	%	%	%	%	%	%	%	%	%	%	%	%
Allinge	13.1	2.0	10.2	1.6	4.4	0.7	3.6	0.2	13.5	12.0	9.6	27.1	2.1
Østermarie	8.3	2.2	11.2	1.6	2.6	0.8	5.2	0.3	15.1	9.2	10.5	30.8	2.0
Svaneke	12.4	2.2	13.9	0.5	3.3	0.6	3.1	0.0	6.5	9.7	9.8	35.3	2.7
Nexø	13.3	2.3	10.9	1.5	2.6	0.6	4.2	0.1	14.2	9.6	13.3	25.5	1.8
Rønne	20.3	1.7	14.0	1.7	3.2	0.5	3.5	0.2	14.0	7.9	9.8	21.8	1.5
Klemensker	10.8	0.9	10.5	1.9	1.6	1.0	4.3	0.4	25.1	11.2	13.4	17.0	1.7
Aakirkeby	14.2	1.6	12.1	2.2	2.5	0.4	6.0	0.3	18.2	10.9	12.3	17.6	1.7
Pedersker	11.3	3.1	11.6	1.9	2.5	0.5	5.1	0.1	16.9	13.3	14.1	18.0	1.7
Hasle	16.7	1.9	11.5	1.9	2.4	0.3	4.0	0.1	17.1	8.4	12.0	21.9	1.8

== Results ==
Party		Votes	%	+/-	Seats	+/-
Bornholm Regional Municipality
Ø	Red-Green Alliance	5,420	23.07	+16.73	7	+5
A	Social Democrats	3,616	15.39	-18.86	4	-4
O	Danish People's Party	3,597	15.31	-0.37	4	0
C	Conservatives	2,896	12.33	+11.48	3	+3
W	Bornholmerlisten	2,623	11.16	+5.39	2	+1
V	Venstre	2,245	9.56	-9.06	2	-3
K	Christian Democrats	985	4.19	-0.01	1	0
F	Green Left	682	2.90	-0.58	0	-1
B	Social Liberals	443	1.89	-0.95	0	0
Å	The Alternative	414	1.76	-4.27	0	-1
D	New Right	399	1.70	+1.16	0	0
G	Vegan Party	130	0.55	New	0	New
L	Lavere skatter og afgifter	44	0.19	New	0	New
Total		23,494	100	N/A	23	N/A
Invalid votes		94	0.29	+0.04		
Blank votes		372	1.13	+0.14		
Turnout		23,960	72.91	-2.72		
Source: valg.dk
