= List of windmills on Bornholm =

This is a list of windmills in Bornholm, Denmark.

== The list ==
Location	Name of mill	Type	Built	Notes	Photograph
Aakirkeby	Egeby Mølle	Post	1787	Source	
Aakirkeby	Limensgade Mølle		1873	Source	
Aakirkeby	Myreagre Mølle	Tower	1865	Source	
Aakirkeby	Saxebro Mølle		1870	Source	
Aakirkeby	Valsemøllen		1867	Source	
Aarsdale	Aarsdale Mølle	Tower	1877	Source	
Gudhjem	Gudhjem Mølle	Tower	1893	Source	
Gudhjem	Røbro Mølle		c. 1885	Source	
Gudhjem	Stenby Mølle		1857	Source	
Gudhjem	Melsted Mølle	Post	c. 1800	Source	
Hasle	Bymøllen		c. 1875	Source	
Nexø	Bakkemøllen		1871	Source	
Pedersker	Kirkemølle	Tower	1861	Source	
Svaneke	Bechs Mølle	Post	1629	Source	
Svaneke	Svanemøllen		1857	Source	
Østermarie	Kuremøllen		1861	Source	
