= 2025 Bornholm municipal election =

← 2021	18 November 2025	2029 →

All 23 seats to the Bornholm municipal council 12 seats needed for a majority
- Turnout: 23,192 (72.3%) ▼0.6%
	First party	Second party	Third party
	O	A	V
Party	Danish People's Party	Social Democrats	Venstre
Last election	4 seats, 15.3%	4 seats, 15.4%	2 seats, 9.6%
Seats won	6	5	4
Seat change	▲2	▲1	▲2
Popular vote	4,515	5,026	3,638
Percentage	19.9%	22.1%	16.0%
Swing	▲4.6%	▲6.7%	▲6.5%
	Fourth party	Fifth party	Sixth party
	F	C	Ø
Party	Green Left	Conservatives	Red-Green Alliance
Last election	0 seats, 2.9%	3 seats, 12.3%	7 seats, 23.1%
Seats won	3	2	2
Seat change	▲3	▼1	▼5
Popular vote	2,176	2,175	2,034
Percentage	9.6%	9.6%	8.9%
Swing	▲6.7%	▼2.8%	▼14.1%
	Seventh party
	K
Party	Christian Democrats
Last election	1 seat, 4.2%
Seats won	1
Seat change	0
Popular vote	904
Percentage	4.0%
Swing	▼0.2%
Mayor before election
Jacob Trøst
Conservatives
Mayor after election
Frederik Tolstrup
Venstre

The 2025 Bornholm Municipal election was held on 18 November 2025, to elect the 23 members to sit in the regional council for the Bornholm Municipal council, in the period of 2026 to 2029. The Danish People's Party would win the most seats, but it was Frederik Tolstrup from Venstre, who would secure the mayoral position.

== Background ==
In the 2021 election, Red–Green Alliance became the largest party. However, it was Jacob Trøst from the Conservatives, who became mayor. However, he would not run for re-election.

Former mayor, and latest mayoral candidate for the Social Democrats, Thomas Thors announced a few days following the 2021 election that he would stop in politics.

== Electoral system ==
For elections to Danish municipalities, a number varying from 9 to 31 are chosen to be elected to the municipal council.

The seats are then allocated using the D'Hondt method and a closed list proportional representation.

Unlike in Danish General Elections, in elections to city councils, electoral alliances are allowed.

== Electoral alliances ==
=== Electoral Alliance 1 ===
Party		Political alignment
B	Social Liberals	Centre to Centre-left
F	Green Left	Centre-left to Left-wing

=== Electoral Alliance 2 ===
Party		Political alignment
C	Conservatives	Centre-right
O	Danish People's Party	Right-wing to Far-right
V	Venstre	Centre-right
Æ	Denmark Democrats	Right-wing to Far-right

=== Electoral Alliance 3 ===
Party		Political alignment
I	Liberal Alliance	Centre-right to Right-wing
K	Christian Democrats	Centre to Centre-right

=== Electoral Alliance 4 ===
Party		Political alignment
Q	Independent Greens	Left-wing
Ø	Red-Green Alliance	Left-wing to Far-Left

== Results by polling station ==
Division	A	B	C	E	F	I	J	K	M	O	Q	V	Æ	Ø
Division	%	%	%	%	%	%	%	%	%	%	%	%	%	%
Allinge	22.2	2.2	8.9	0.1	8.8	1.9	1.0	3.8	1.5	20.0	0.6	14.0	1.9	13.1
Østermarie	16.2	2.0	9.9	0.3	10.5	1.8	0.8	4.3	2.0	17.9	1.1	14.2	2.2	16.9
Svaneke	22.8	2.9	8.4	0.3	13.4	0.6	0.2	3.1	1.3	10.5	0.9	16.1	1.3	18.0
Nexø	24.2	2.0	9.9	0.8	9.4	0.9	1.4	4.0	2.4	18.4	0.7	16.9	1.2	7.7
Pedersker	17.5	2.1	10.2	0.6	6.6	1.5	1.3	4.1	1.3	23.3	0.2	21.5	2.6	7.2
Aakirkeby	18.0	1.6	9.7	0.3	6.8	1.4	1.1	5.2	2.2	24.0	0.4	19.8	2.4	7.1
Klemensker	15.8	1.7	10.3	0.4	6.5	0.5	1.5	4.5	3.9	27.4	0.6	15.9	4.3	6.8
Rønne	25.5	2.9	9.5	0.2	11.2	1.4	1.8	3.6	2.3	18.5	0.5	14.6	1.2	6.8
Hasle	23.4	1.8	9.5	0.3	8.5	1.3	1.3	3.6	2.1	21.8	0.5	15.5	2.4	7.9

== Results ==
Party		Votes	%	+/-	Seats	+/-
Bornholm Municipality
A	Social Democrats	5,026	22.11	+6.72	5	+1
O	Danish People's Party	4,515	19.87	+4.56	6	+2
V	Venstre	3,638	16.01	+6.45	4	+2
F	Green Left	2,176	9.57	+6.67	3	+3
C	Conservatives	2,175	9.57	-2.76	2	-1
Ø	Red-Green Alliance	2,034	8.95	-14.12	2	-5
K	Christian Democrats	904	3.98	-0.22	1	0
B	Social Liberals	524	2.31	+0.42	0	0
M	Moderates	499	2.20	New	0	New
Æ	Denmark Democrats	421	1.85	New	0	New
J	Fælleslisten Bornholm	312	1.37	New	0	New
I	Liberal Alliance	301	1.32	New	0	New
Q	Independent Greens	127	0.56	New	0	New
E	Bornholm 360	76	0.33	New	0	New
Total		22,728	100	N/A	23	N/A
Invalid votes		65	0.20	-0.08		
Blank votes		399	1.24	+0.05		
Turnout		23,192	72.31	-0.60		
Source: valg.dk

== Opinion polls ==
Polling firm	Fieldwork date	Sample size	Ø	A	O	C	V	K	F	B	E	I	J	M	Q	Æ	Others	Lead
Norstat	20 Oct - 2 Nov 2025	1013	8.2 (2)	23.4 (6)	18.8 (5)	9.4 (2)	16.0 (4)	3.1 (1)	11.6 (3)	1.8 (0)	0.2 (0)	2.0 (0)	0.3 (0)	0.9 (0)	0.7 (0)	2.6 (0)	–	4.6
Epinion	4 Sep - 13 Oct 2025	490	9.8	29.1	18.2	9.2	11.4	–	9.5	0.5	–	5.9	–	2.1	–	2.8	0.0	10.9
Jysk-Analyse/TV-2-Bornholm	5 - 20 Feb 2025	1000	9.2 (2)	32.7 (9)	8.4 (2)	13.2 (3)	14.4 (4)	3.8 (1)	8.0 (2)	2.3 (0)	–	2.0 (0)	0.0 (0)	1.1 (0)	–	3.3 (0)	0.0	18.3
2024 european parliament election	9 Jun 2024		7.3	20.0	7.7	8.0	18.0	–	15.6	4.2	–	4.1	–	5.0	–	7.8	–	2.0
Jysk-Analyse/TV-2-Bornholm	22 - 27 Nov 2023	1105	10.8 (3)	26.0 (6)	10.0 (2)	16.6 (5)	14.8 (4)	3.1 (0)	9.1 (2)	0.3 (0)	–	4.1 (1)	–	2.1 (0)	–	0.4 (0)	0.0	9.4
Jysk-Analyse/TV-2-Bornholm	6 - 11 Sep 2023	1004	10.8 (3)	25.5 (7)	10.5 (3)	16.9 (4)	9.9 (2)	3.5 (1)	5.8 (2)	1.1 (0)	–	1.6 (0)	–	–	0.0 (0)	0.0 (0)	0.0	8.6
2022 general election	1 Nov 2022		5.2	35.3	6.3	3.7	18.7	2.0	6.4	1.0	–	3.6	–	6.1	0.2	6.4	–	16.6
Jysk-Analyse/TV-2-Bornholm	19–25 May 2022	1012	14.8 (4)	23.9 (6)	11.6 (3)	16.4 (4)	14.6 (4)	3.6 (1)	3.6 (0)	3.3 (0)	–	1.4 (0)	–	0.0	0.6 (0)	0.0	0.0	7.5
2021 regional election	16 Nov 2021		8.9	38.4	14.9	4.5	20.5	3.9	2.0	2.0	–	0.4	–	–	–	–	–	17.9
2021 municipal election	16 Nov 2021		23.1 (7)	15.4 (4)	15.3 (4)	12.3 (3)	9.6 (2)	4.2 (1)	2.9 (0)	1.9 (0)	–	–	–	–	–	–	–	7.7
