= Boderne =

- Village
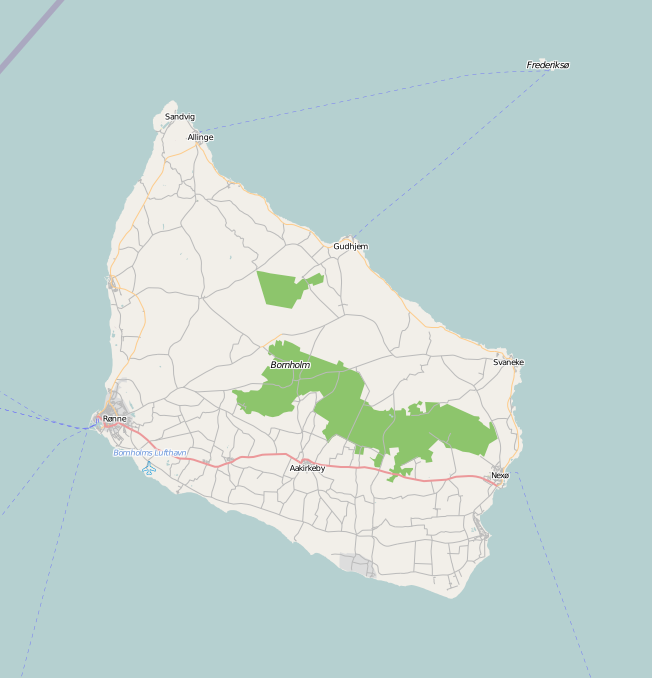
- Location on Bornholm
- Coordinates: 55°01′26.4″N 14°54′23.8″E
- Country: Denmark
- Region: Capital (Hovedstaden)
- Municipality: Bornholm
- Time zone: UTC+1 (CET)
  - Summer (DST): UTC+2 (CEST)

Boderne is a small village on the south-eastern coast on the island of Bornholm in Denmark. It is located approximately 5 km south of Aakirkeby.
