= Kuremøllen =

Wooden smock mill on the Danish island of Bornholm

Coordinates: 55°08′16″N 15°05′32″E

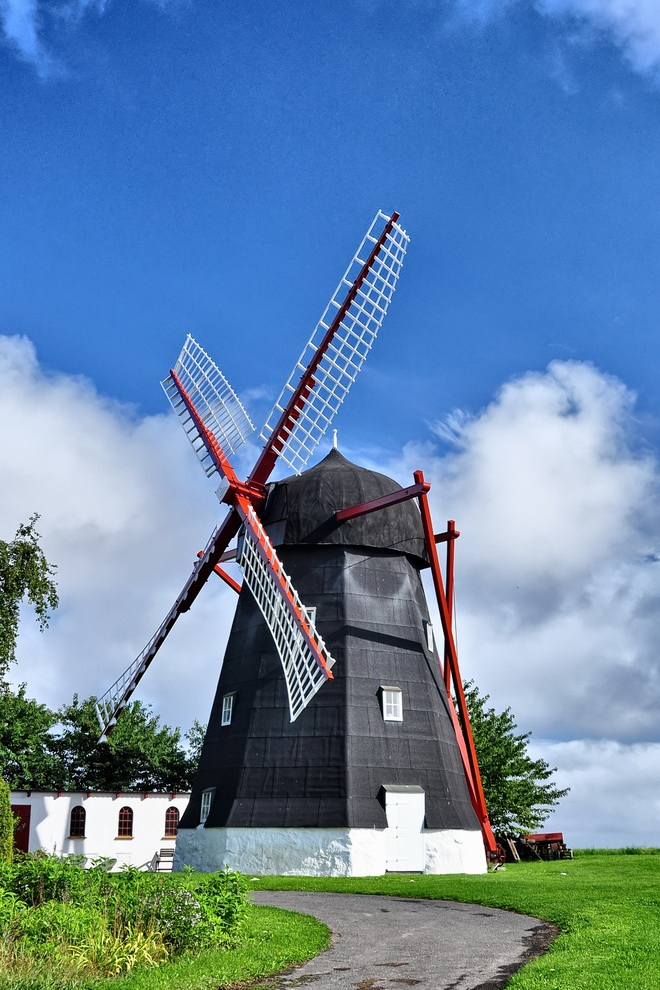
Kuremøllen near Svaneke, Bornholm

Kuremøllen is a wooden smock mill located 3 kilometres (1.9 mi) west of Svaneke on the Danish island of Bornholm. Built in 1861, it remained in service until 1960.

== Description ==
Christian Sommer, the current owner's grandfather, built the windmill in 1861 for himself after having constructed nearby Svanemøllen for a group of Svaneke citizens a few years earlier. Kuremøllen was not as impressive as Svanemøllen: it was a bit smaller and had a boat-shaped cap rather than an onion top. It was also finished with wooden planks rather than with oak shingles. When his son Emil took the mill over in 1900, he undertook a number of improvements: first an engine, then he added self-adjusting flaps (1903) and finally opened a bakery (1912). He also replaced the cap with an onion top and added an automatic yaw system with a fantail.

In 1930 the engine was replaced and, in 1940, a new beam was installed together with new sails. From 1943, the mill was run by Christian Sommer who terminated its operation in the 1950s but continued to run the bakery until 1976. In 1978, the association, Kuremøllens Venner, was founded to take care of the mill's upkeep. They spent several years restoring the windmill, adding a new tail, repairing the shaft and the sails, and more recently recladding the tower and having the engine repaired. When the tarpaulin was renewed in 1993, it became clear that the mill had once a shingle cladding for a number of years, probably in the very beginning of the 20th century.

== The mill today ==
The mill is open to visitors during the summer months.

== See also ==
- List of windmills on Bornholm
