= Egeby Mølle =

Post mill in Denmark

Coordinates: 55°03′54″N 15°00′07″E

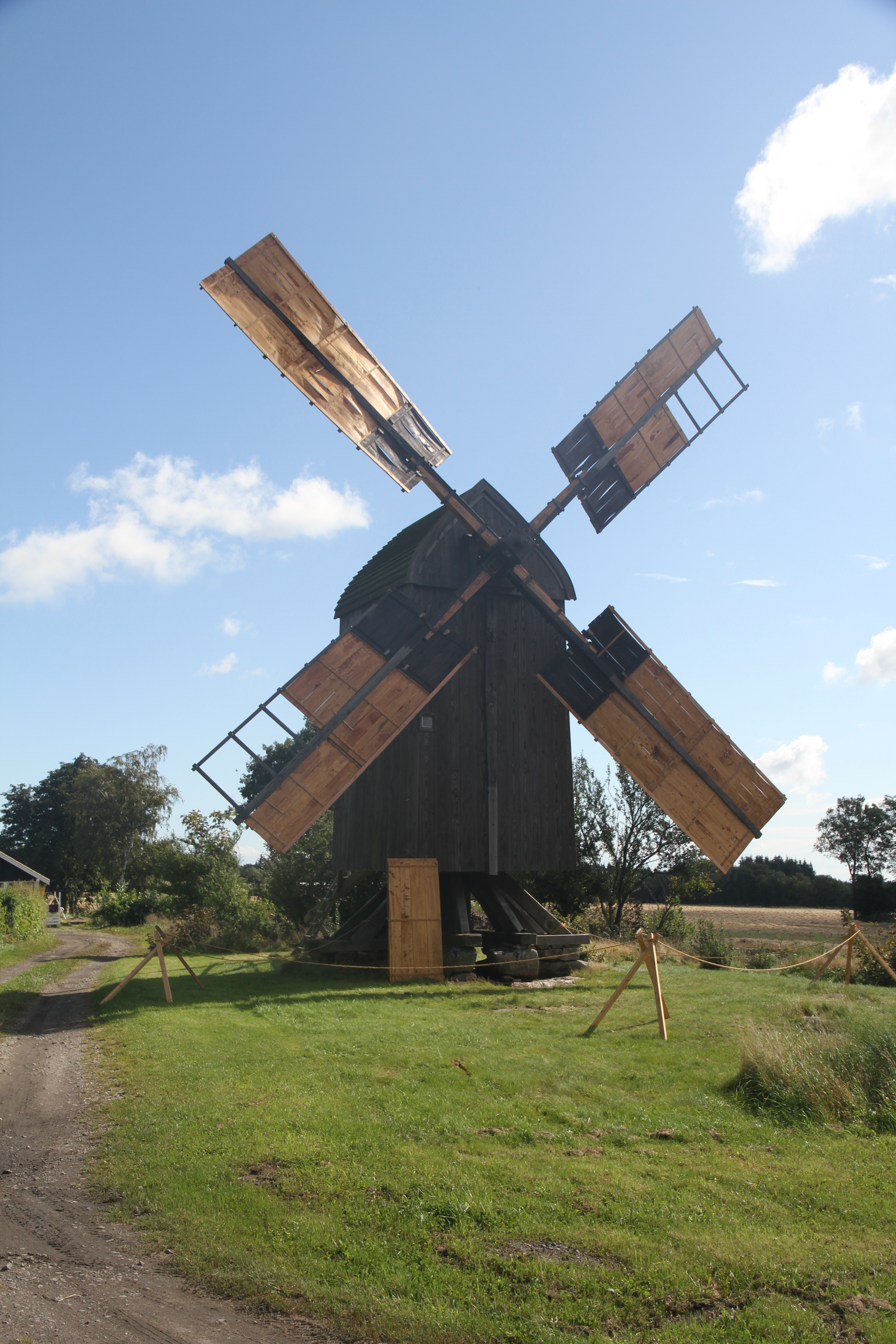
Egeby Mølle, Bornholm

Egeby Mølle (Egeby Windmill) is a post mill located 5 kilometres (3.1 mi) east of Aakirkeby on the Danish island of Bornholm. Built in 1787, it remained in service until the late 1920s.

== History ==
First built in 1787, in connection with a move in 1794 which brought it closer to the road, the mill was slightly enlarged, making it 30 centimetres (12 in) wider. In 1847, the mill was repaired after being struck by lightning. Originally there was a half-timbered mill house next to the mill, still visible on a photograph from 1928. In 1934, Foreningen Bornholm acquired the mill and has since taken care of its upkeep. New sails were fitted in the 1960s but had to be removed in 1987 after a storm. In 1996, comprehensive restoration work was carried out and completed in 1999, bringing the mill into a fully operational state. Since 1964, Egeby Mølle has been a listed building.

The first recorded owner was Hans Peter Hiorth (1800). The last was Mathis Peder Madsen who bought it on 12 June 1906. Foreningen Bornholm acquired it on 28 March 1935.

== Description ==
Of the three surviving post mills on Bornholm, Egeby is the most characteristic. A timber structure with a wooden roof, the mill has four latticed sails. The single millstone is of Nexø sandstone. During the restoration work completed in 1999, much of the original machinery was retained but the sails, base, roofing and external cladding were replaced.

In addition to Egeby Mølle, there are two other post mills on Bornholm, Bechs Mølle and Tejn Mølle, both listed.

== See also ==
- List of windmills on Bornholm
