= Tejn Mølle =

Post mill on the Danish island of Bornholm

Coordinates: 55°12′10″N 14°48′35″E

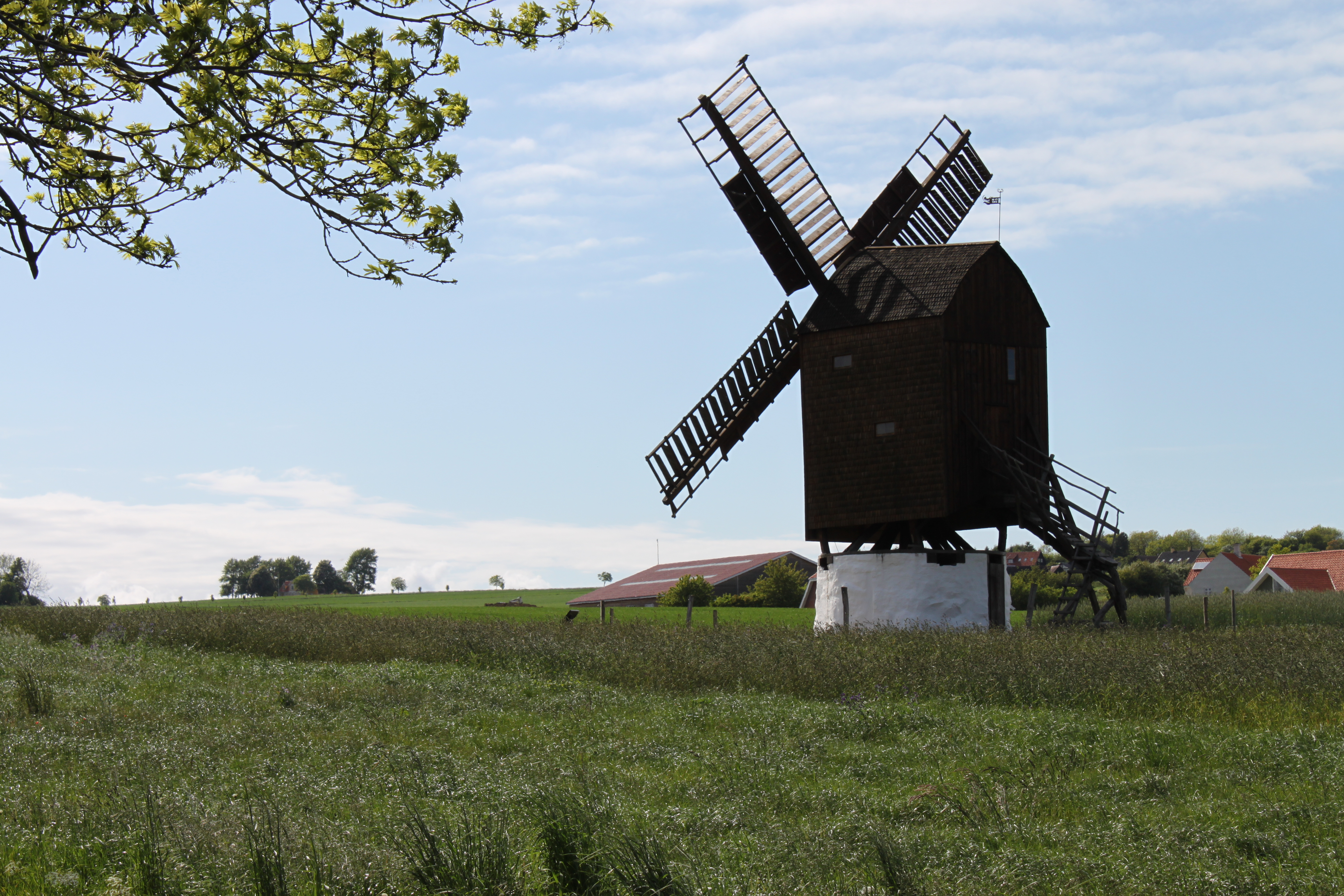
Tejn Mølle, now at Melstedgård, Bornholm

Tejn Mølle (Tejn Windmill), also known as Melsted Stubmølle, is a post mill on the Danish island of Bornholm. It was recently moved from Tejn on the west coast to Melstedgård near Gudhjem where it is part of Bornholms Landbrugsmuseum (Bornholm's Farming Museum).

The exact age of the mill is not known but it was probably built around 1800. Originally located at Aarsballe, in c. 1850 it was moved to Tejn. Despite being positioned at the top of a cliff, the wooden structure was not high enough. In 1882, it was therefore repositioned on a round base. The owner, Peter Mikkelsen, took advantage of the move to replace the old sails with new ones complete with adjustable flaps. Unlike most post mills, the sails rotate anticlockwise. Mikkelsen also enlarged the mill, both in height and depth. His son operated the mill until 1941 when Foreningen Bornholm took it over to ensure its upkeep. By 2000, the mill was no longer able to function properly as a result of trees and buildings in the surroundings. In 2006, it was therefore decided it should be moved to Landbrugsmuseet Melstedgård where it was inaugurated in 2009.

Tejn Mølle (Tejn Windmill) became a listed building in 1959. There are two other post mills on Bornholm, Bechs Mølle and Egeby Mølle, both listed.

== The mill today ==
At its new location at 7A Møllegade in Gudhjem, the mill stands in a fine position to the west of the museum farm known as Melstedgård. Its high position not only makes it visible from the main road but means there is enough wind for it to function. It is used to grind corn to feed the farm animals. The museum farm is of course open to visitors. There is an exhibition about mills on Bornholm as well as a demonstration of the mill.

== See also ==
- List of windmills on Bornholm
