= Pedersker Kirkemølle =

Windmill in Bornholm, Denmark

Coordinates: 55°01′36″N 14°58′19″E

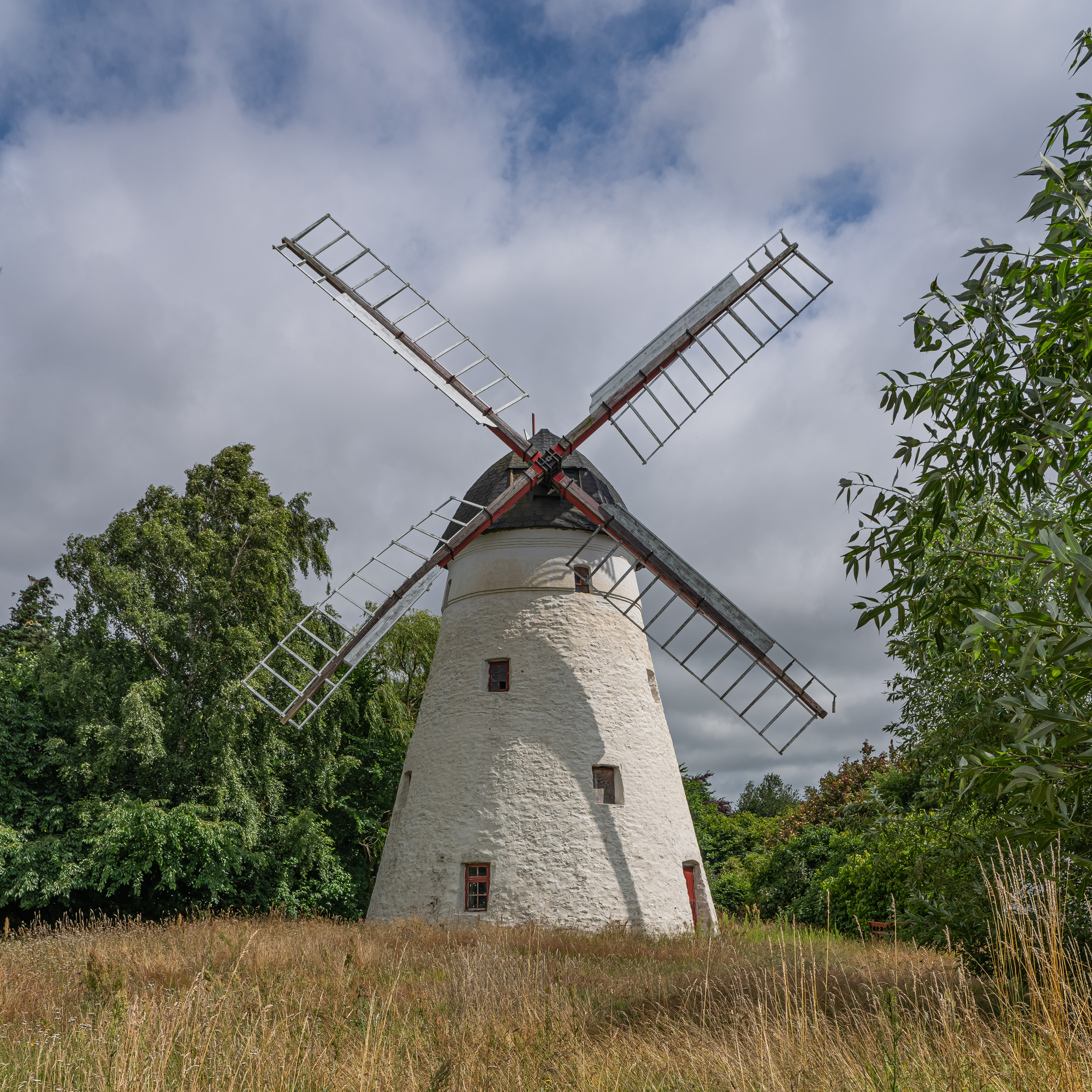
Pedersker Kirkemølle, Bornholm

Pedersker Kirkemølle is a Dutch windmill located in the little village of Pedersker on the Danish island of Bornholm. It functioned until 1969.

== Description ==
The Kirkemølle is the island's oldest standing stone mill. It dates from 1861 when it replaced a 150-year-old post mill on the same site. The cylindrical tower mill measured 9.5 metres (31 ft) to the cap. Built of sandstone masonry, it had a wooden cap and four floors. Originally it had common cloth sails but in 1899 they were replaced with self-regulating patent sails. Until 1908, the mill was rotated manually but after being heightened a further 1.9 metres (6 ft 3 in), it was equipped with a fantail. In 1932, a 34 hp Ruston & Hornsby diesel engine was installed. The mill was closed in 1969 but from 1969 it functioned using the diesel engine rather than from wind power.

After buying the mill in 1982, Pedersker Lokalforening undertook substantial restoration work including the replacement of the cap (1979) and the wings (2002). The adjoining warehouse also received a new roof.

In the 19th and early 20th century, there was both a bakery and an inn at the mill. The bakery later moved into the village.

== See also ==
- List of windmills on Bornholm
