= Aarsdale Windmill =

Smock windmill on the Danish island of Bornholm

Coordinates: 55°06′14″N 15°08′35″E

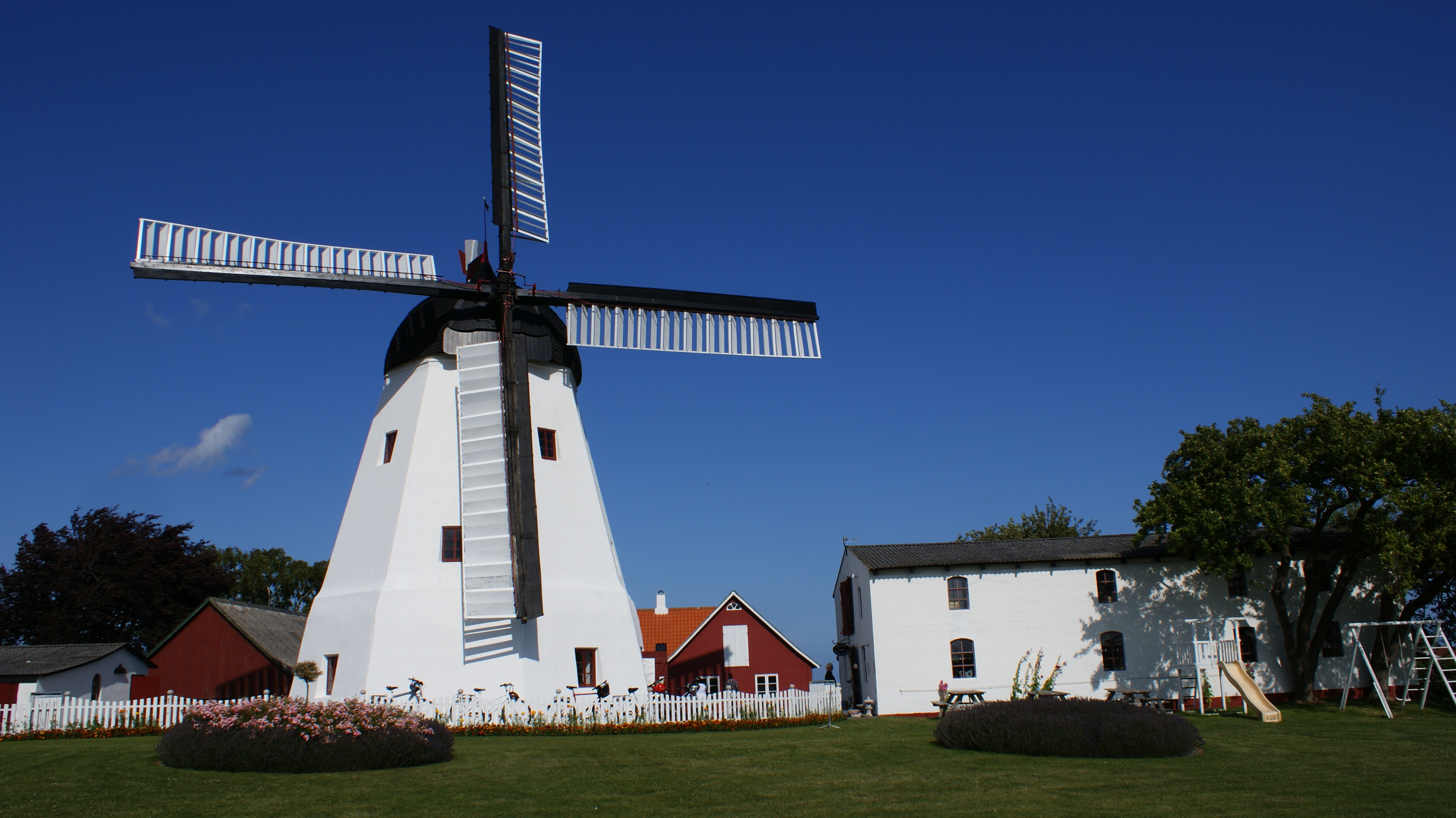
Aarsdale Windmill, Bornholm

Aarsdale Windmill (Danish: Aarsdale Mølle) is a smock windmill located on a hilltop on the southern fringe of Aarsdale, 3 kilometres (1.9 mi) south of Svaneke on the Danish island of Bornholm. Constructed in 1877, it is still in operational condition although it is no longer in regular use.

== Description ==
H. P. Mikkelsen, the present owner's grandfather, built the mill in 1877. Around 1880, a bakery was opened in the building to the south of the mill but ceased operations at the beginning of the 21st century. An octagonal brick structure, the mill is 20 metres (66 ft) high. Originally it had cloth sails and an onion cap with a tail. In 1919, two self-adjusting sails were installed and two more in 1921. The first backup motor for use in calm weather came in 1904, the second in 1939 and the third in 1961. Anthon Mikkelsen, the current owner and operator, took it over in 1956. He has taken special care of it since it was listed in 1960. Substantial work has been carried out over the years on the cap, sails and the yaw bearing. In 1998, a new oak fantail was fitted.

Aarsdale Windmill was one of eight Dutch mills on Bornholm. The only other location where Dutch mills are to be found in Denmark is Sillerup near Haderslev. Around 1900, steam-powered mills started to replace windmills and watermills. The Aarsdale Mill, however, continued to mill flour until 2003, longer than any other Danish windmill.

== Visits ==
The windmill is open to visitors on most days. Inside the mill, all the machinery can be seen. "Anton på Møllen", a film from 1995 with English subtitles, shows the mill in full operation. On windy days the sails continue to rotate.

== See also ==
- List of windmills on Bornholm
