= Rispebjerg =

Archaeological site on the Danish island of Bornholm

Coordinates: 55°01′042″N 14°01′09″E

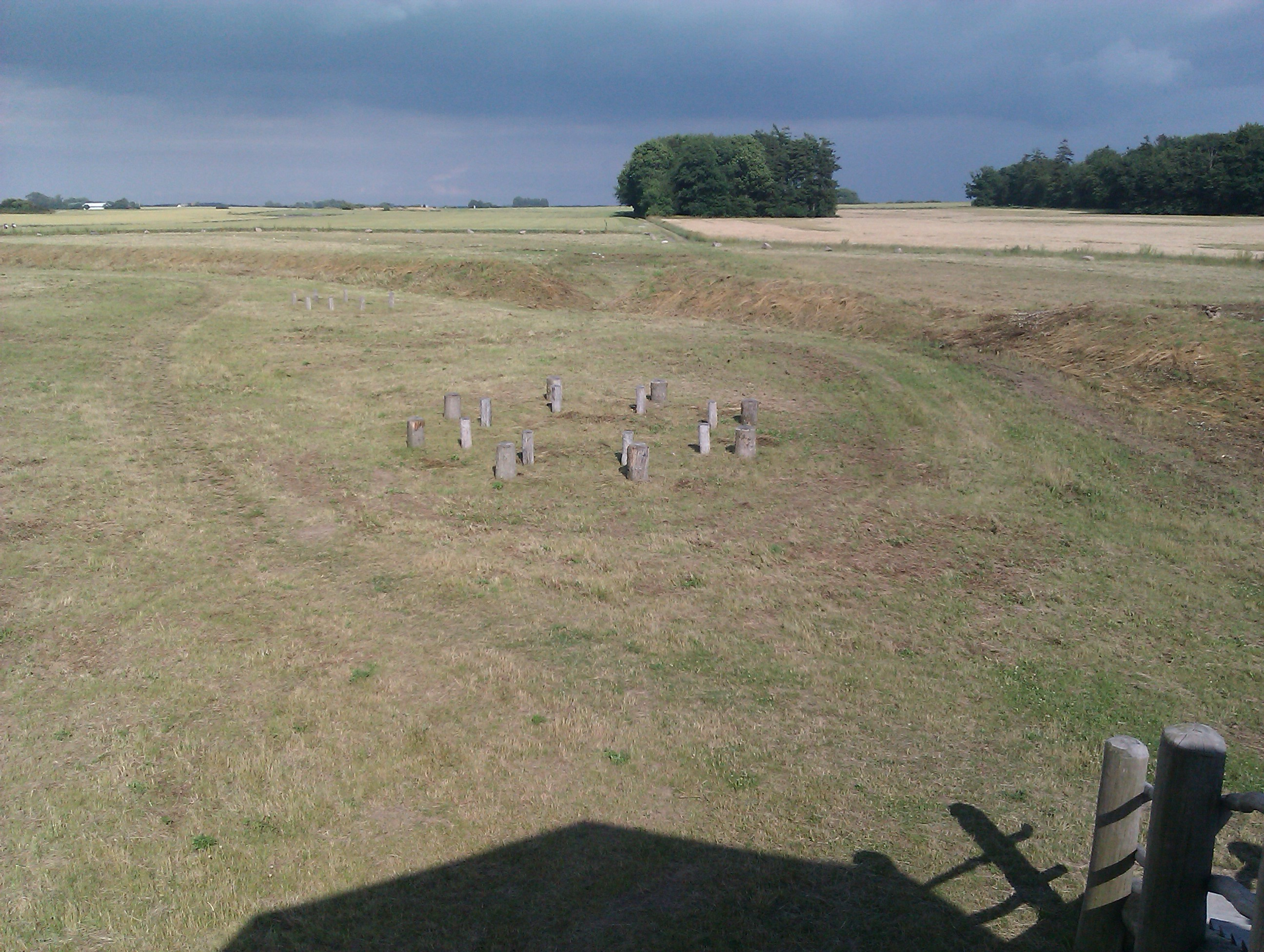
Rispebjerg archaeological site, Bornholm

Rispebjerg is an archaeological site on the Danish island of Bornholm. Located 7 km west of Snogebæk on the road to Pedersker, it contains both the remains of a Neolithic sun temple and Iron Age earthworks.

== Description ==
Bordered by the Øleådalen valley, the site is marked by Iron Age earthworks consisting of semicircular ramparts 3 metres (9.8 ft) high and a dry ditch 2 metres (6 ft 7 in) deep, dating back some 2,000 years. There are also remains of a number of 5,000-year-old woodhenges, one of which has been recreated with stumps of wood in the original holes, giving an impression of the size of the ancient site. An observation tower provides information and views over the historic area.

== Early finds ==
The site was discovered in 1897, leading to finds near a spring of six flint axes and four flint chisels from the mid-Neolithic. The following year, a further 13 flint axes and two chisels were found, making it one of the principal sites for finds of flint axes and chisels. The fact that the finds were made near a spring indicated that the site had religious significance.

== Ancient wooden circles ==
The site contains a number of ancient wooden circles from about 2,800 BC. Traces of the original wooden poles have been found and recently marked out with stumps of wood. From the clay pieces, burnt flint and burnt bones found on the site, it has been suggested that the circles may have served as a sun temple. They apparently supported a clay-covered platform, accessed by a flight of steps, on which experts believe fires could have been lit, possibly for sacrifices. Clay disks with ancient sun symbols have also been found, ritually buried under the poles. It appears as if the wooden circles were constructed over three separate periods.
