= Gudhjem Windmill =

Windmill on Bornholm

Coordinates: 55°12′30″N 14°58′21″E

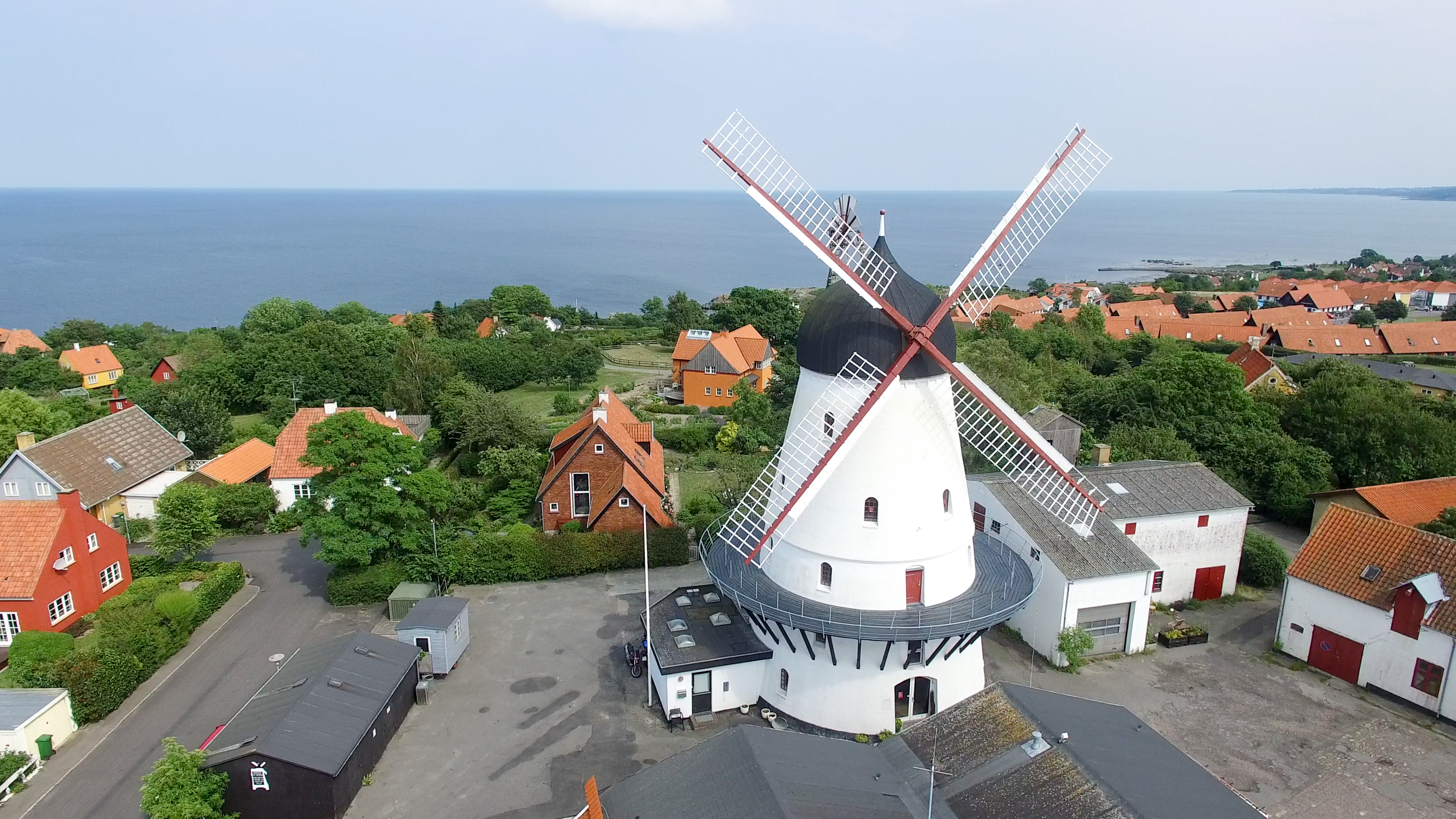
Gudhjem Windmill, Bornholm

Gudhjem Windmill (Danish: Gudhjem Mølle) is located in the village of Gudhjem on the Danish island of Bornholm. With a sail span of 24 metres (79 ft), the Dutch mill is the largest windmill in Denmark. It served from 1893 to 1962 when it was taken out of commission.

== History ==
The mill was built by Matts Kullmann for his son Christian in 1893. The large cap was manufactured by Frichs, Aarhus. In connection with the mill, a house, warehouse, bakery, machine room and electrical generator were also constructed. The Kullmans operated the mill until 1944 when it was bought by the corn firm Asmussen from Copenhagen. The sails rotated for the last time in 1959. In 1961 Bornholms Korn took it over, but completely stopped operations in 1962. In 1965 all the machinery was removed and the windmill was converted into a discothèque and later into a ceramics store. In 1993, the sails were replaced and in 1998 the hat and wind rose were renovated.

== The mill today ==
Gudhjem Mølle is owned by the insurance company Bornholms Brand. Today the mill is used by Bornholms Andels og Foderstofforetning for training courses and meetings. Since 2007, the public have been able to visit the shop and café which now occupy the mill's two lower floors.

== See also ==
- List of windmills on Bornholm
