= Aakirkeby Municipality =

Municipality on Bornholm, Denmark

Coordinates: 55.070084°N 14.920503°E

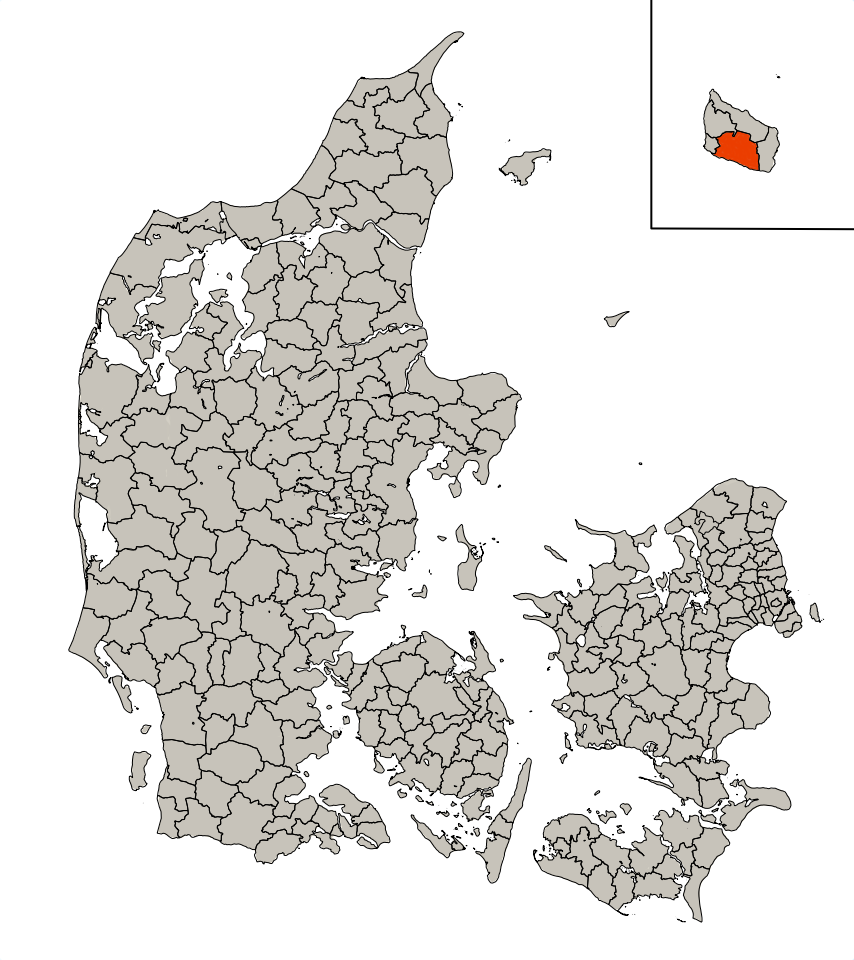
Aakirkeby Municipality's location in Denmark, 1970–2007.

Aakirkeby Municipality is a former municipality of Denmark which existed from 1970 until 2007. Its administrative region is today part of Bornholm Municipality.

The municipality was created in 1970 as a result of the 1970 Danish Municipal Reform. In 2005, it covered an area of 186 km^{2}, and had a total population of 6,622. The main town and seat of the municipality was in Aakirkeby. Aakirkeby Municipality ceased to exist as a result of the Municipal reform of 2007.
