= Melstedgård =

Old farm on the Danish island of Bornholm

Coordinates: 55°12′09″N 14°58′45″E

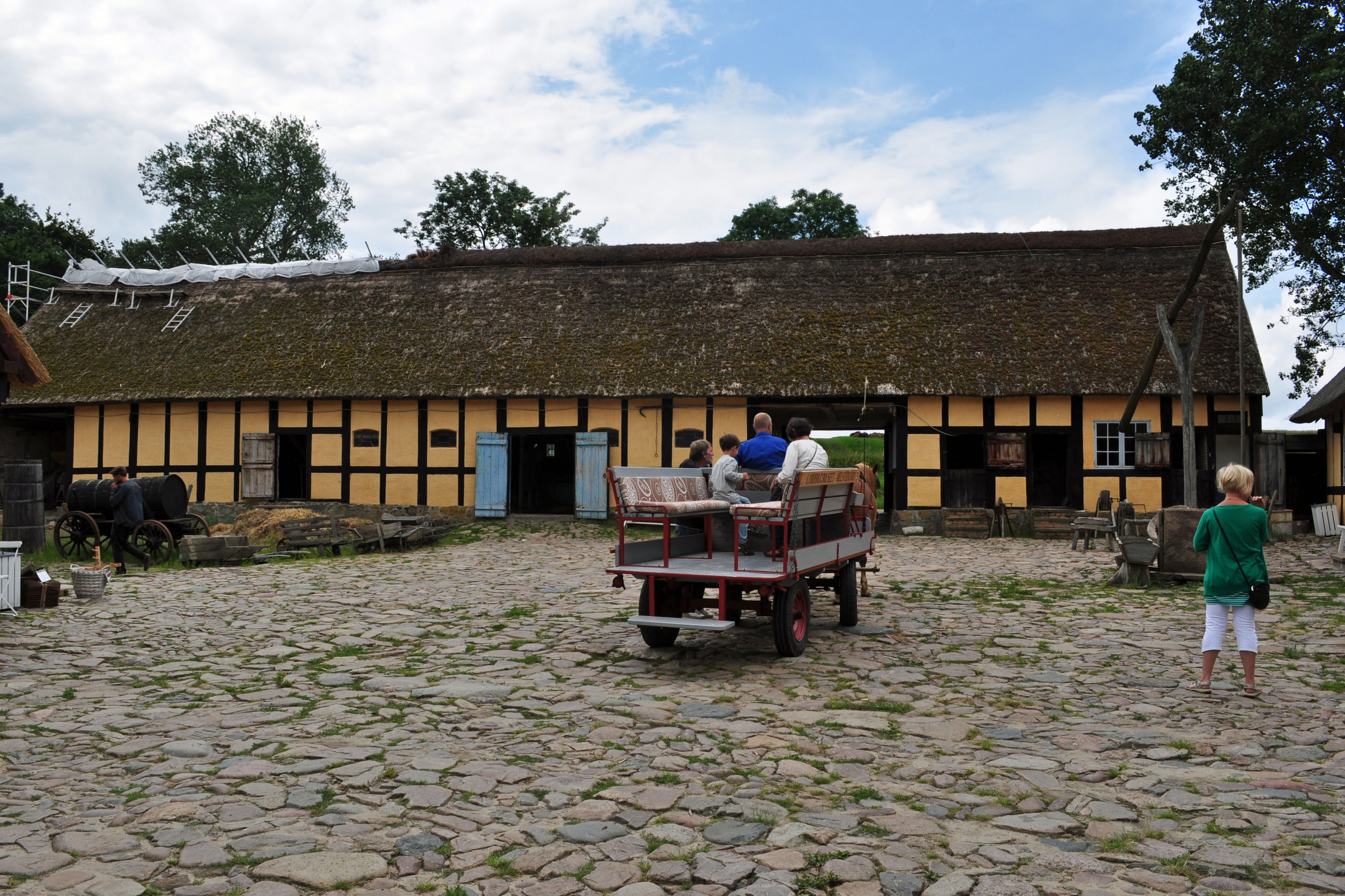
Melstedgård, near Gudhjem, Bornholm

Melstedgård, also known as Bornholms Landbrugsmuseum (Bornholm's Farming Museum), is an old farm 13 kilometres (8.1 mi) west of Svaneke on the Danish island of Bornholm. Built in 1801, the half-timbered farmhouse now serves as the centre of a farming museum. One of its main attractions is the windmill, Tejn Mølle, which opened in 2009. Melstedgård is operated s a part of the Bornholm Museum.

== History ==
The farm can be traced back to the 17th century, when the fields were tilled by a farmer who lived nearby. The first farmhouse, built at the end of the 17th century, was demolished around 1796, allowing today's half-timbered building to be completed in 1801 on the same site. In 1982, it was acquired by the Bornholm authorities who have entrusted it to Bornholm Museum.

The first owners were Svend Thorsen and Kirstine Pedersdatter. Their initials can be seen on the farmhouse. Hans Svendsen bought the farm in 1857, adding several outhouses and renovating the farmhouse in 1862. Milking facilities were added in 1873 paving the way for increased milk production. Sevendsen and his son Julius also made improvements inside the house, adding a kitchen and modernizing the rooms. Svend Andersen, Julius' nephew, took the farm over in 1947, becoming its last private owner.

== Farmhouse ==
The house has been preserved with its historic furnishings (or copies thereof), reflecting its appearance in the 19th century. In the living room, there is a Swedish oven from the 17th century. The alcove in the wall contains a bed. There is also an 18th-century Bornholm grandfather clock.

=== Pantry and kitchen ===
The pantry has a large oven while the adjoining kitchen has an iron stove with hotplates, bought in the 1870s to replace an open fire. The old kitchen implements are on display.

=== Bedroom ===
The room is painted blue to keep the flies away, just like the toilet and the stable. A separate bedroom with a double bed was unusual in farmhouses in the 1860s as beds were usually in the living room. A washing stand and jug for daily washing form part of the bedroom furnishings.

=== Servants rooms ===
At the back of the house. there is a small room with two beds which could be used by the maids, children or visitors. The two beds could be extended if necessary. The two wardrobes housed their personal belongings. At the other end of the house there are three bedrooms for children or guests, one a little larger than the others.

=== Drawing room ===
The little wall-papered drawing room is better kept than the living room with fine curtains and a cloth on the table. It is heated by an iron oven.

=== Office ===
The farmer had his private office where he could handle accounts and keep a diary. The old photographs on the walls reflect the interest in photography triggered by photographers from Copenhagen who visited the island from the 1860s. The bird cage reflects the family's high standard of living.

=== Veranda ===
The veranda or conservatory was originally for guests or family gatherings but from 1862 it was used by the family as a living and dining room. The room was designed for relaxation with a rocking chair, sofa and armchairs where guests could be received or books could be read aloud. The room contains pictures of Hans and Ane Margrethe Svendsen who owned the farm from 1857 to 1903.

== Outhouses ==
There are three outhouses. The one on the left served as a repair shop and also had an unheated room for the farm hands as well as a stable and a box for a foal. The southern outhouse houses old farm machinery as well as three old tractors, one of them a 1948 John Deere sent from the United States under the post-war Marshall Plan. There is also harvesting machinery and an old sledge. The east outhouse was originally used for storing and drying grain. The area used for cows and pigs has been converted into a shop and exhibition. In the entrance there are some of the museum's carriages including a late 19th-century Landau, a charabanc and a pony trap from 1920.

== The windmill ==
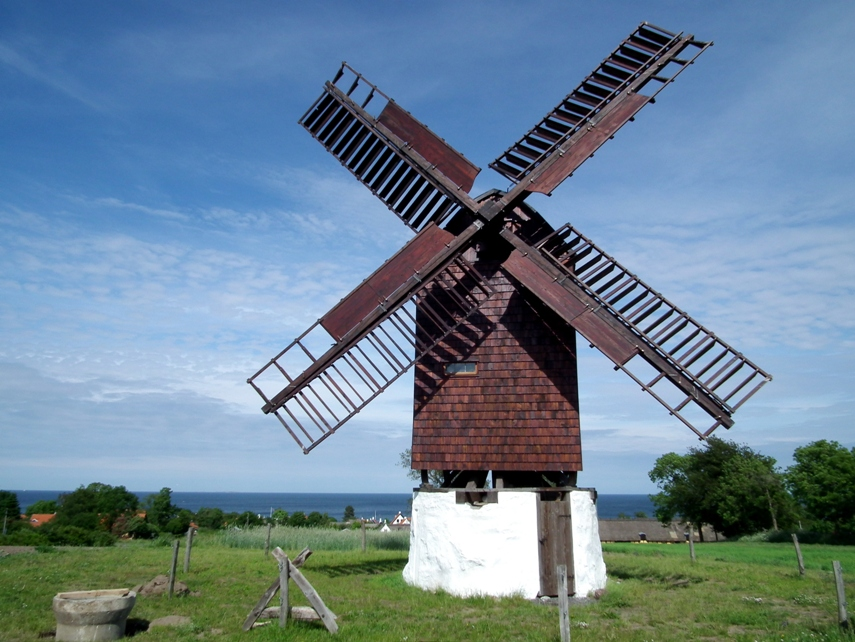
Tejn Windmill

Tejn Mølle, as its name implies, used to stand above the village of Tejn on the island's west coast. Dating from around 1800, it was moved to Melsted after the surrounding buildings and trees prevented its proper functioning. It now stands in a field on the other side of the main road from Gudhjem to Svaneke where it is used for grinding feed for the farm animals. There is an exhibition about mills on Bornholm as well as a demonstration of the mill.
