= Myreagre Mølle =

Whitewashed tower mill on the Danish island of Bornholm

Coordinates: 55°04′08″N 14°57′56″E

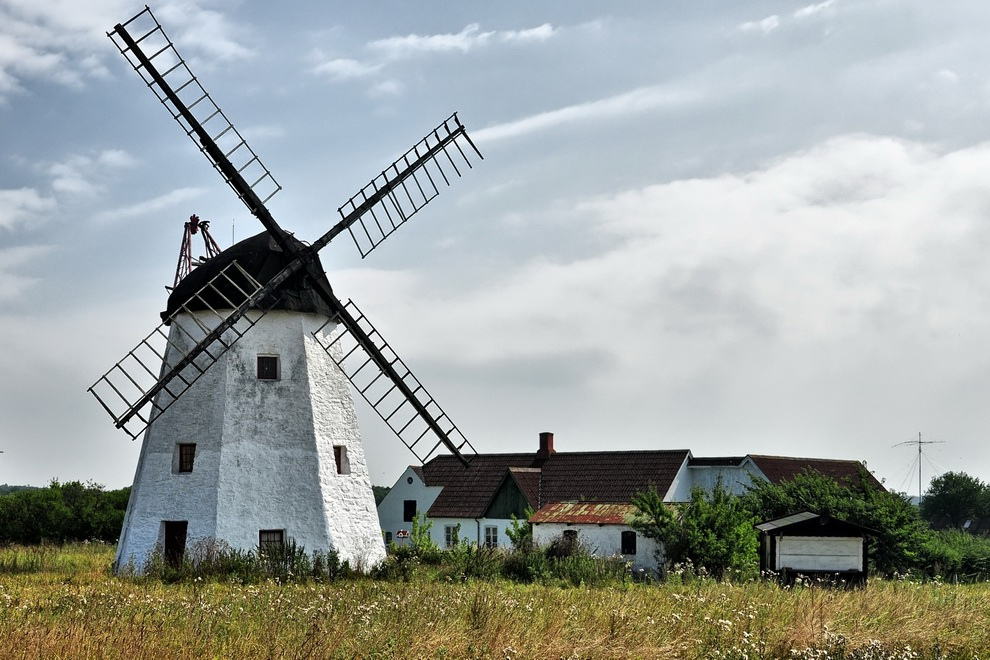
- Myreagre Mølle in 2010.
- Type of building: Windmill
- Built: 1865
- Location: Bornholm, Denmark
- Type of windmill: Tower mill

Myreagre Mølle is a whitewashed tower mill located 3 kilometres (1.9 mi) east of Aakirkeby on the Danish island of Bornholm. Built in 1865, it remained in service until 1970.

== Description ==
Built in 1865, the mill was originally a grain mill. From 1925, a bakery was added to its operations. In 1921, the mill was modernized with a wind rose and self-adjusting sails and in 1926 a 14 hp Hornsby oil engine was installed. In 1971, the self-adjusting sails were renewed. At that time, the mill was still functional but was no longer in use. The octagonal tower (circular inside) is built of natural sandstone and the cap is roofed with roofing felt. There is an engine room with a functioning engine. The mill is in a reasonable state of repair. The cap can yaw and the sails can rotate but as a result of the old age of the owner it is not being properly maintained.

== See also ==
- List of windmills on Bornholm
