= Allinge-Gudhjem Municipality =

Former municipality in Denmark

Coordinates: 55°16′27″N 14°47′59″E

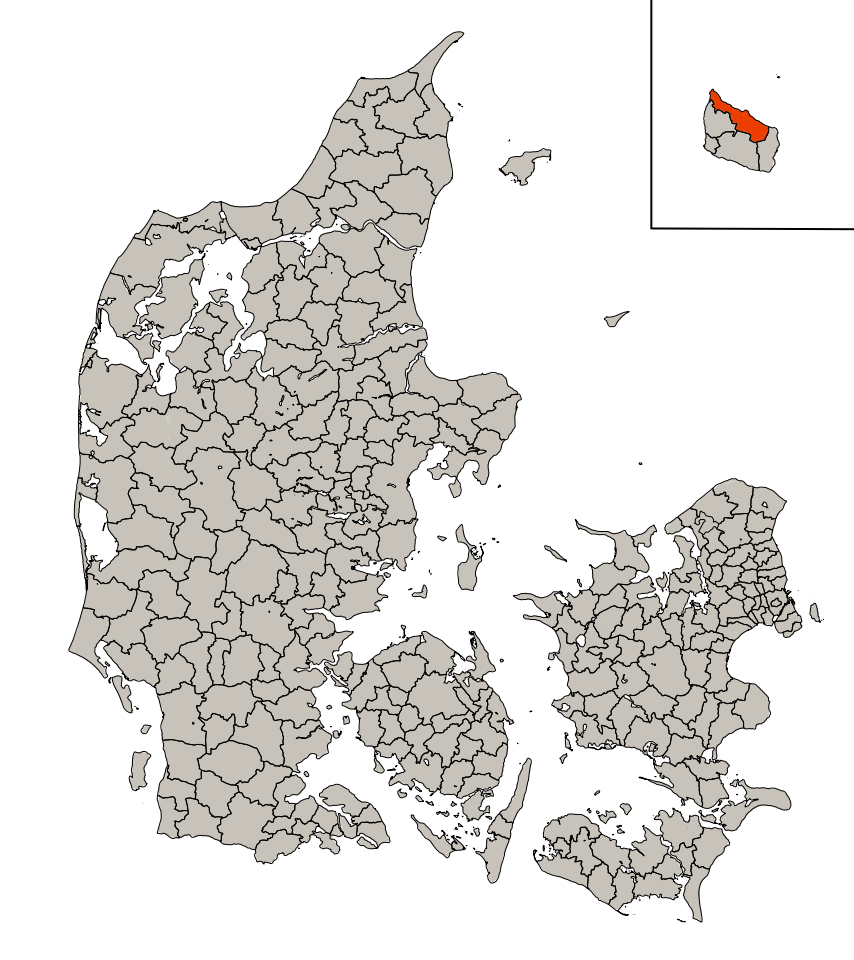
Allinge-Gudhjem Municipality's location in Denmark, 1970–2006.

Allinge-Gudhjem Municipality (Danish: Allinge-Gudhjem Kommune) is a former municipality in Denmark, on the island of Bornholm in the Baltic Sea.

The municipality covered an area of 154 km^{2}, and had a total population of 7,658.

This former municipality is, since January 1, 2003, included in the municipality of Bornholm.
