= Aarsdale =

- Village
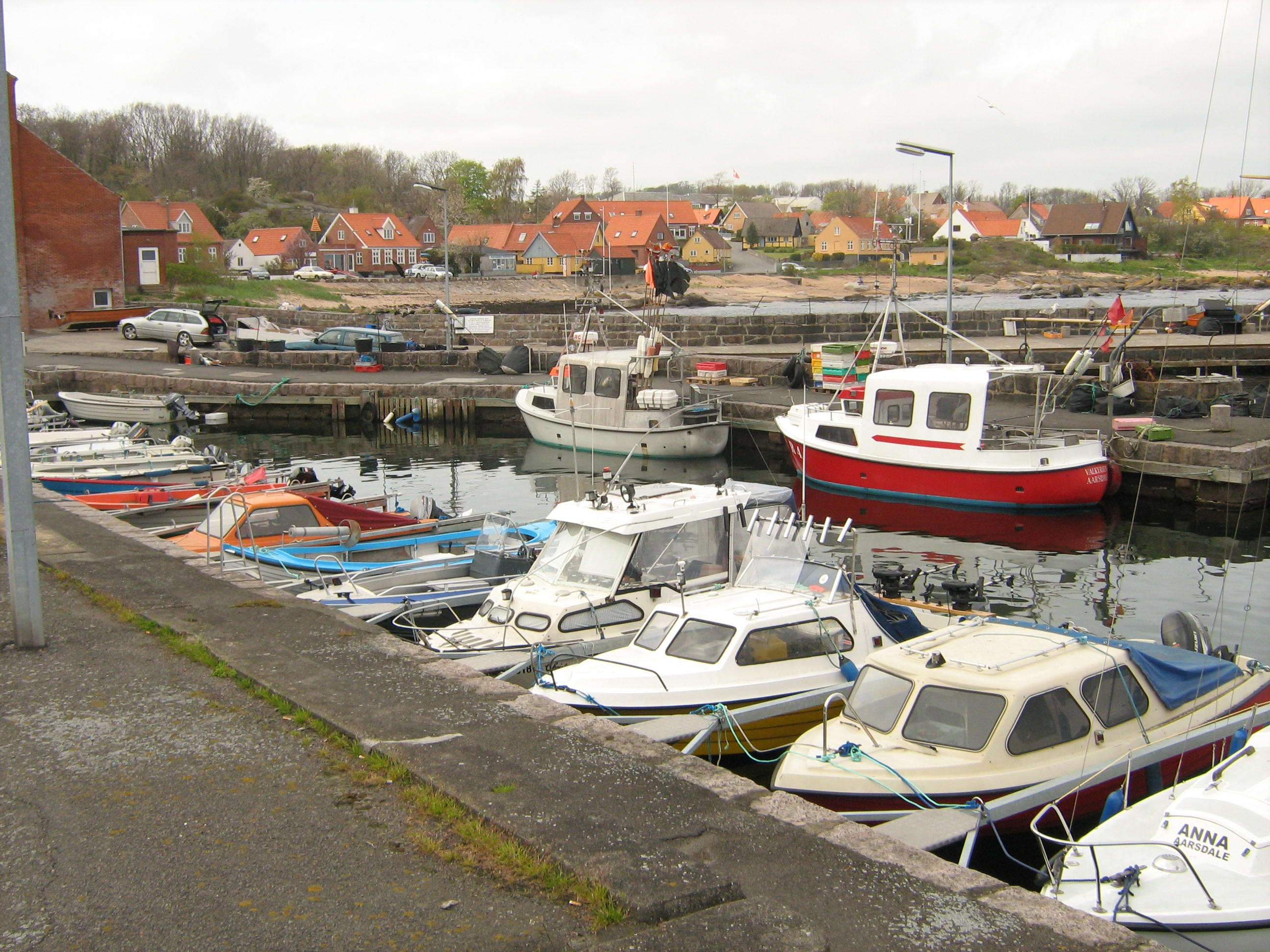
- Aarsdale harbour

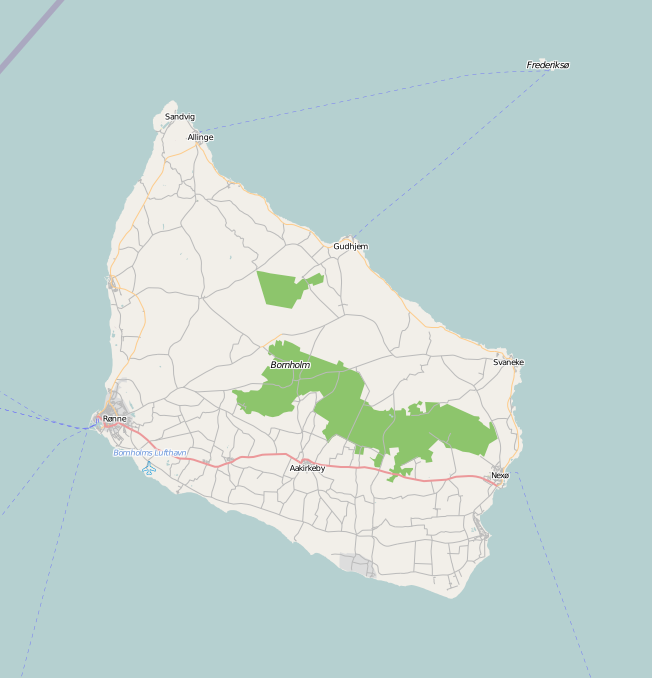
- Location on Bornholm
- Coordinates: 55°06′00″N 15°08′00″E
- Country: Denmark
- Region: Capital (Hovedstaden)
- Municipality: Bornholm

Population (2026)
  - Total: 264
- Time zone: UTC+1 (CET)
  - Summer (DST): UTC+2 (CEST)

Aarsdale (also: Årsdale) is a village on the eastern coast of the Baltic island of Bornholm, Denmark. Located between Svaneke and Nexø, it has a population of 264 (1 January 2026). Once a prosperous fishing village, its economy now relies mainly on tourism thanks to its half-timbered houses, its harbour and its windmill.

== History ==
The name Aarsdale can be traced back to 1410 in connection with herring processing when it occurred as Osdael. The fishing village has been inhabited at least since the 17th century,. The harbour built in 1870 has been extended several times since. It still has three smokehouses.

== Tourism ==
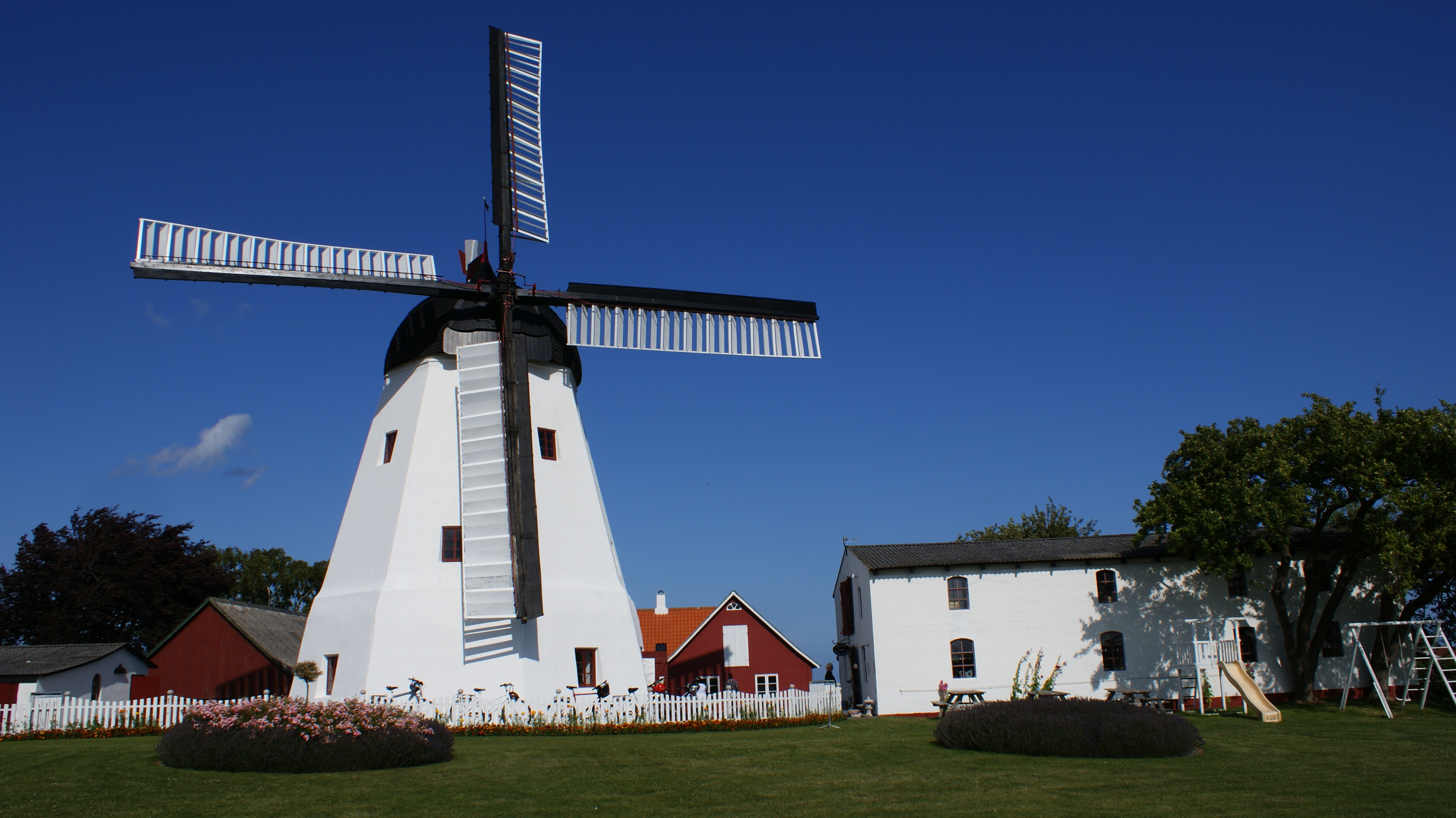
1877 windmill at Aarsdale

The eight-sided Dutch windmill (1877) close to the main road at the southern end of the village is a local landmark. It is the only windmill on the island which has been in constant operation since it was built serving three generations of the Mikkelsen family. Flour production is now for private use only.

The village has many half-timbered houses, some of them 200 years old. The harbour, originally built for fishing boats, now also has facilities for pleasure craft. Aarsdale has a small beach suitable for bathing on Bornholm's rocky eastern coast. The village also has three smokehouses providing a variety of smoked fish and seafood.

There are interesting walks along the rocky coastline both towards Svaneke to the north and Nexø to the south.
