= Svanemøllen =

Wooden smock mill on the Danish island of Bornholm

Coordinates: 55°08′14″N 15°08′03″E

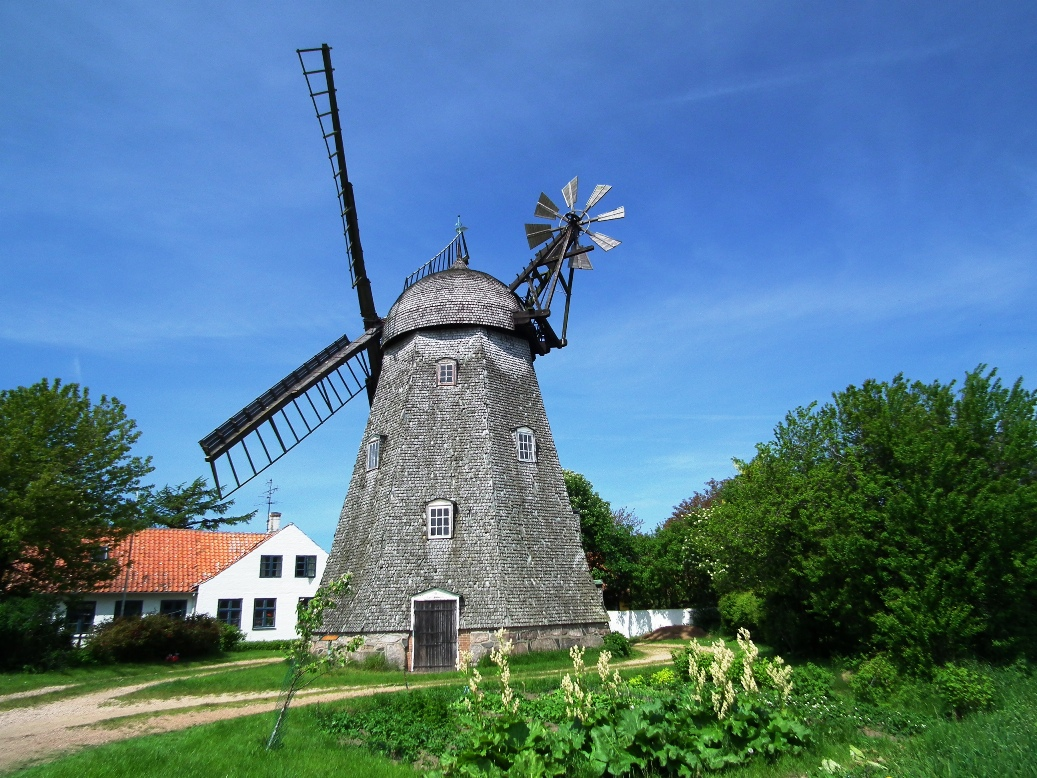
Svanemøllen, Svaneke, Bornholm

Svanemøllen (Swan Mill) is a wooden smock mill located just west of Svaneke on the Danish island of Bornholm. Built in 1857, it remained in service until the 1950s. Since 1960, it has been a listed building.

== Background ==
Over the years, Bornholm has had up to 30 smock mills built of wood and almost as many in masonry. Today four wooden and three masonry mills remain. Of the wooden mills, Svanemøllen is the only one to be listed. It is certainly the prize of the wooden mills, well built and well preserved. Its octagonal body is clad with oak shingles as is its ogee cap.

== History ==
In 1855, ten influential citizens from Svaneke and Ibsker founded an association aimed at building a smock windmill. There were already four post mills in the Svaneke area but only Bechs Mølle was still fully functional. Even that, however, was by no means as productive as a modern smock mill. Bornholm already had considerable experience with smock mills, starting with the one on Christiansø built in 1761. The association therefore bought a plot of land northwest of the town, not far from the three northern post mills. They commissioned Christian Sommer from Rønne to build the mill which was completed in 1857. It had five grinders, three for flour, the others for meal and husks. Together with the mill, there was a half-timbered two-storey house with a cellar providing accommodation for the miller, initially Christian Sommer himself, who operated the mill until 1861. Thereafter Hans Anker Kofoed and his son Hans Anker ran the mill until 1920, opening a bakery in 1895 and later adding self-adjusting sails, a self-adjusting yaw system and an engine housed in a little shed northwest of the mill. During the First World War, the engine provided Svaneke with electric power.

Both the windmill and the bakery ceased operations in the 1950s. In 1958, just before it was going to be demolished, the mill was acquired by Svanekes Venner who subsequently undertook extensive restoration work. Since the mill was listed in 1960, the shingles and wind rose have been replaced (1966–67), the cap and two of the sails have been completely renewed (1993–94) and the wind rose has been fully repaired (2001).

== See also ==
- List of windmills on Bornholm
