= Bechs Mølle =

Post mill in Svaneke on the Danish island of Bornholm

Coordinates: 55°08′26″N 15°08′01″E

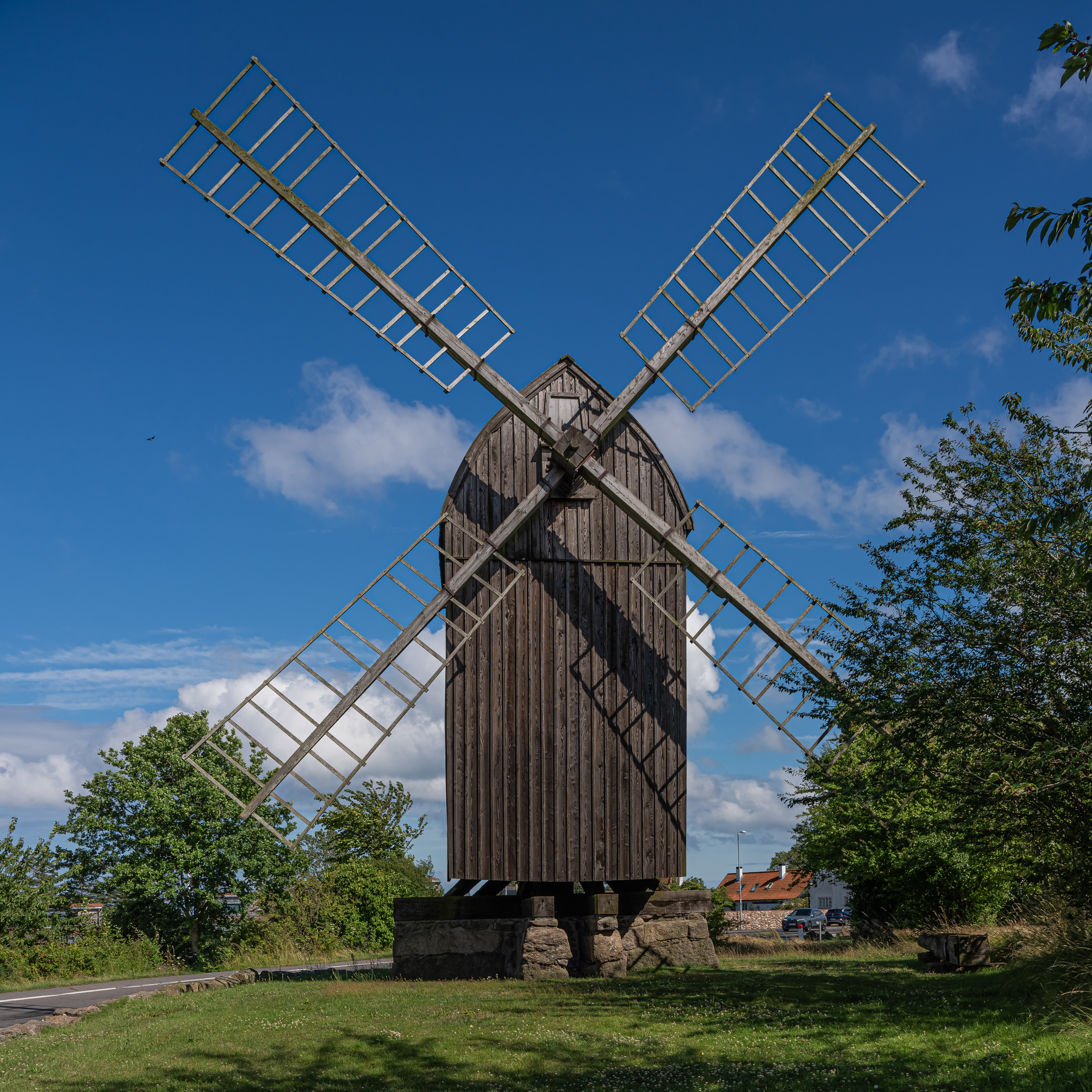
Bechs Mølle, Bornholm

Bechs Mølle (Bech's Windmill) is a post mill located in Svaneke on the Danish island of Bornholm. Built in 1629, it is the oldest standing windmill in Denmark. In recent years, extensive restoration work has been carried out, preserving as far as possible the old structure and machinery.

== History ==
Built in 1629, the post mill on Svaneke's Møllebakken is the oldest standing windmill in Denmark. In the 17th century, it was one of three mills on the northern fringe on Svaneke. David Wolfsen had the mill built and was the first owner. In 1737, a rich inhabitant of Svaneke, Jochum Thiesen, bought the mill, inscribing his and his wife's names on the main beam. After it had changed hands several times, Anders Hansen Kofoed from Nexø bought it in 1793 and in 1814 passed it on to his daughter and his son-in-law Hans Bentzen Bech, from whom the mill takes its name. His son, Peder Hansen Bech was the next to run the mill. It was he who from 1848 to 1860 built the house with a bakery which now stands opposite the mill.

The mill was first next to the cliff top but was moved when the road was laid in 1866. On that occasion, it was positioned on a foundation about one metre high, enlarged and equipped with the latest fittings. Surprisingly, there were four flour grinders in what was technically a primitive mill. P. H. Bech's son, Peter Emilius Hansen Bech, acquired the mill in 1880 and operated it until he died in 1934. He had however sold it to Foreningen Bornholm in 1928 who thereafter cared for its upkeep.

The mill which still has wooden sails remained in service until 1928. In 1975 it was transferred to Byforeningen Svanekes Venner who are still the owners. Major restoration work was carried out in 1972–73 and again in 2002–2007. It has been a listed building since 1960.

In addition to Bechs Mølle, there are two other post mills on Bornholm, Egeby Mølle and Tejn Mølle, both listed. Bechs Mølle is however the oldest and largest of the three.

== The mill today ==
The windmill has been well preserved. Much of the original structure and machinery has been retained. However, while it is in a good state of repair, it is no longer functional. Foreningen Bornholm and Svanekes Venner continue to care for the upkeep of which is considered to be a highly valuable monument. Positioned next to the road from Svaneke to Gudhjem, it is easily accessible but normally remains closed to visitors.

== See also ==
- List of windmills on Bornholm
