= Pedersker =

Village in Bornholm, Denmark

Coordinates: 55°01′48″N 14°59′32″E

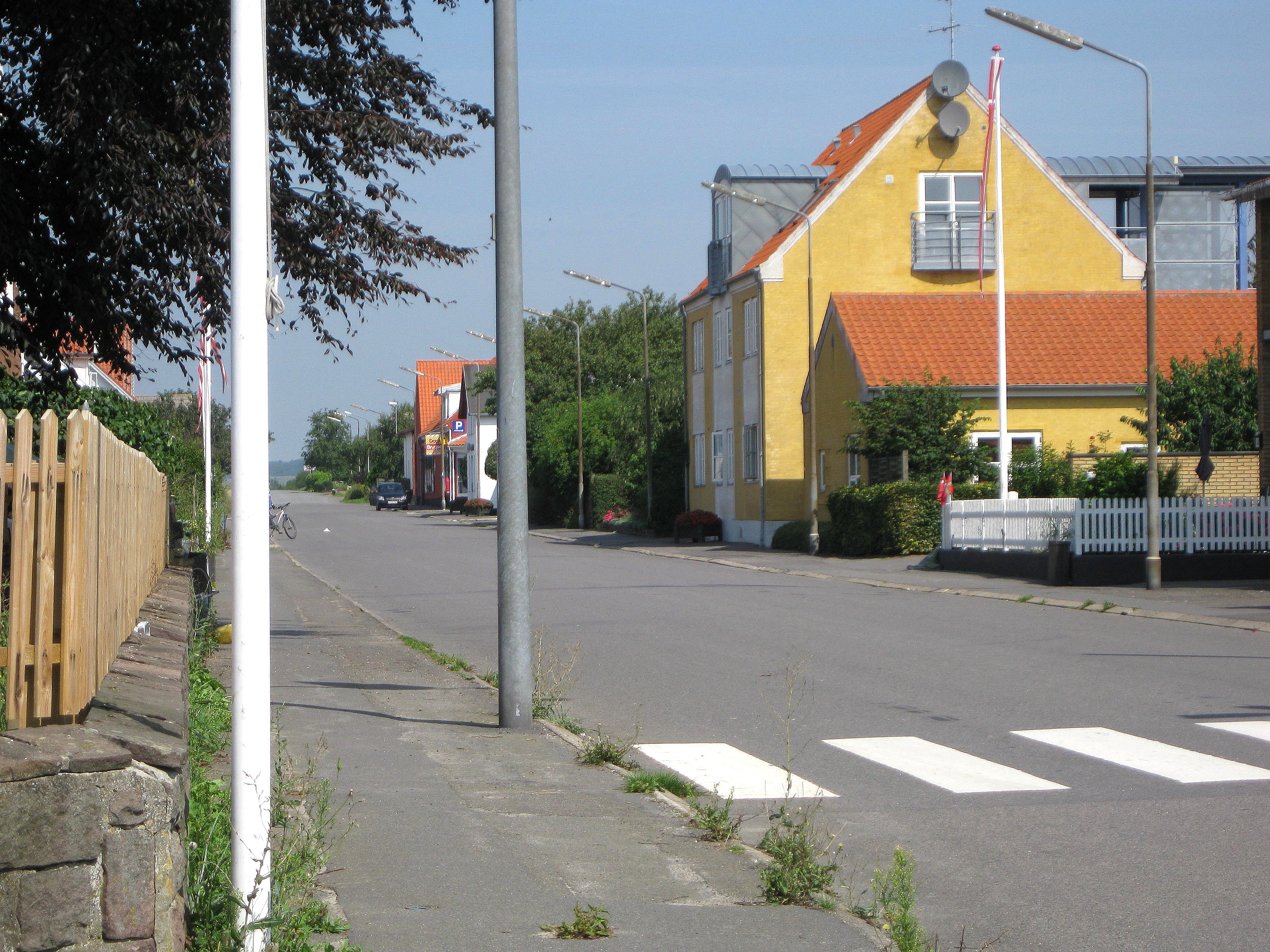
Pedersker, Bornholm

Pedersker is a village in the southeast of the Danish island of Bornholm, 8 kilometres (5.0 mi) southeast of Aakirkeby and 11 kilometres (6.8 mi) southwest of Nexø. As of 2026, it has 204 inhabitants.

== Description ==
Pedersker is a quiet Danish village surrounded by farmed fields. To the north, beyond the former railway, the Lynggårdsskoven woods are managed by the State. The populated area is mainly in a triangular section between the main road and the railway, some 64% of the houses dating to before 1950. To the south of the village, the little fishing village of Bakkerne Havn has become an important summer house development. There is a private school in the village and the old dairy is considered to be of importance to the local heritage. The old railway station at 51 Pedersker Hovedgade served the Rønne–Nexø railway which ran from 1900 to 1968. Not far from the church to the west of the village (at 208 M Søndre Landevej), there is a Dutch windmill, Kirkemøllen, built in 1861. It was renovated and repainted in 2010.

== St Peter's Church ==
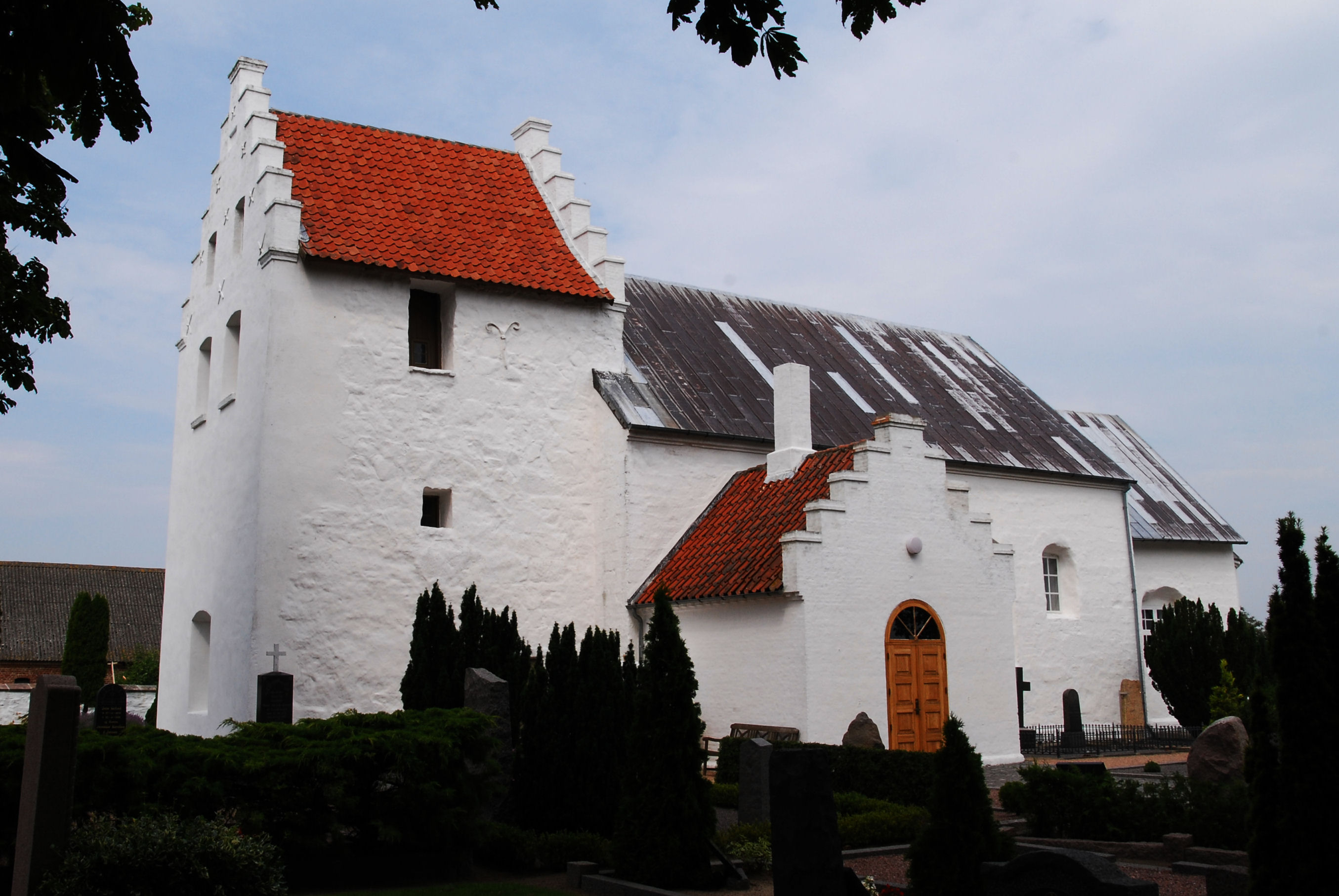
St Peter's Church, Pedersker

The village gets its name from St Peter's Church as Peders ker simply means "Peter's church" in Bornholm dialect. Built in the Romanesque style, the church is thought to be the oldest on Bornholm, dating from the 10th or the 11th century.

== Rispebjerg ==
The archeological site of Rispebjerg is located some 3 kilometres (1.9 mi) east of the village. Open to visitors, it contains the remains of a Neolithic sun temple as well as Iron Age earthworks.
