= Allinge-Sandvig =

Town on Bornholm in Capital, Denmark

- Town
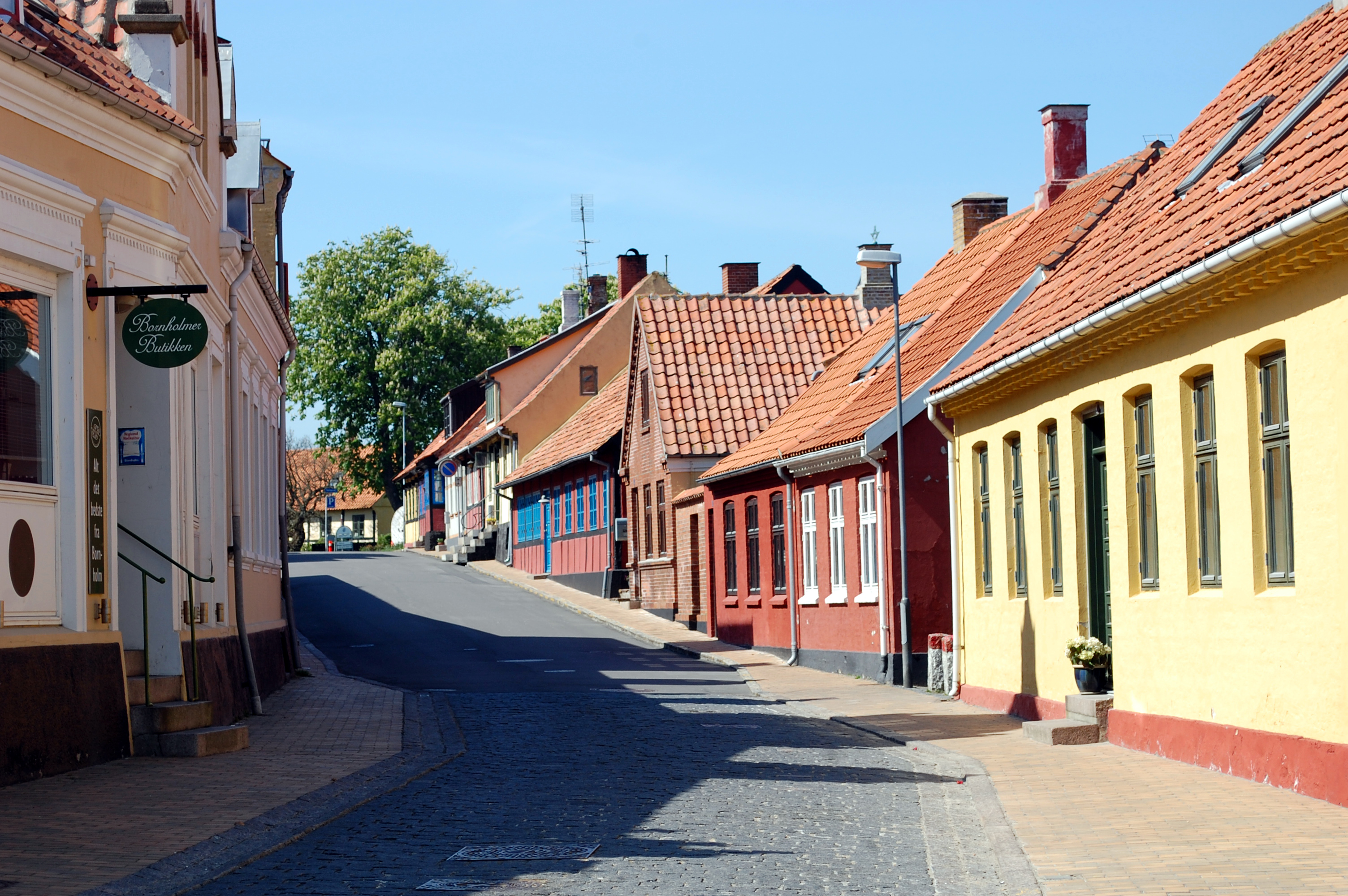
- Road from Allinge Harbour

- Coat of arms

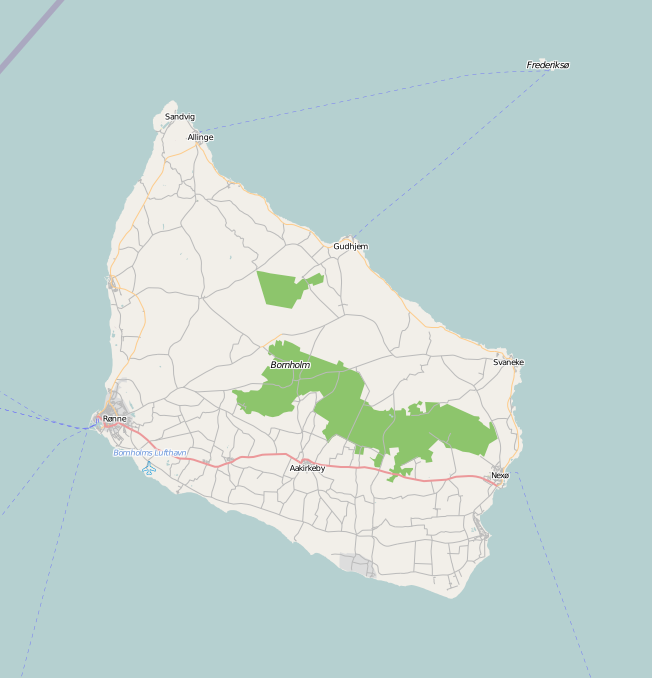
- Location on Bornholm
- Coordinates: 55°16′40″N 14°48′5″E
- Country: Denmark
- Region: Capital (Hovedstaden)
- Municipality: Bornholm

Area
  - Urban: 0.69 sq mi (1.78 km^{2})

Population (2026)
  - Urban: 1,448
  - Urban density: 2,110/sq mi (813/km^{2})
- Time zone: UTC+1 (CET)
  - Summer (DST): UTC+2 (CEST)

Allinge-Sandvig is a small town on the northern coast of the Baltic island of Bornholm, Denmark. Its population is 1,448 (1 January 2026). It was part of the former municipality Allinge-Gudhjem. Sandvig is the northernmost part of the town.

== History ==
Prior to Allinge and Sandvig becoming urban areas, people in the Bronze Age lived there and made rock carvings at Madsebakke. Not all carvings of ships, suns, and footprints have survived, however. Late in the 19th century, stone quarries flourished in the area and some rock carvings were blown up between 1885 and 1902.

Allinge and Sandvig were two separate towns, the former formed near the natural harbour on the northwestern coast, while Sandvig has been a small fishing village, whose origins can be traced to the Middle Ages, its name derived from a sandy cove on the coast. The port of Allinge dates from 1862, while that of Sandvig from 1831 to 1833.

== Hammershus fortress ==
The Hammershus fortress, Northern Europe's largest medieval fortification dating from 13th century is located northwest of Allinge, near the Hammeren promontory, the northernmost point on the island.

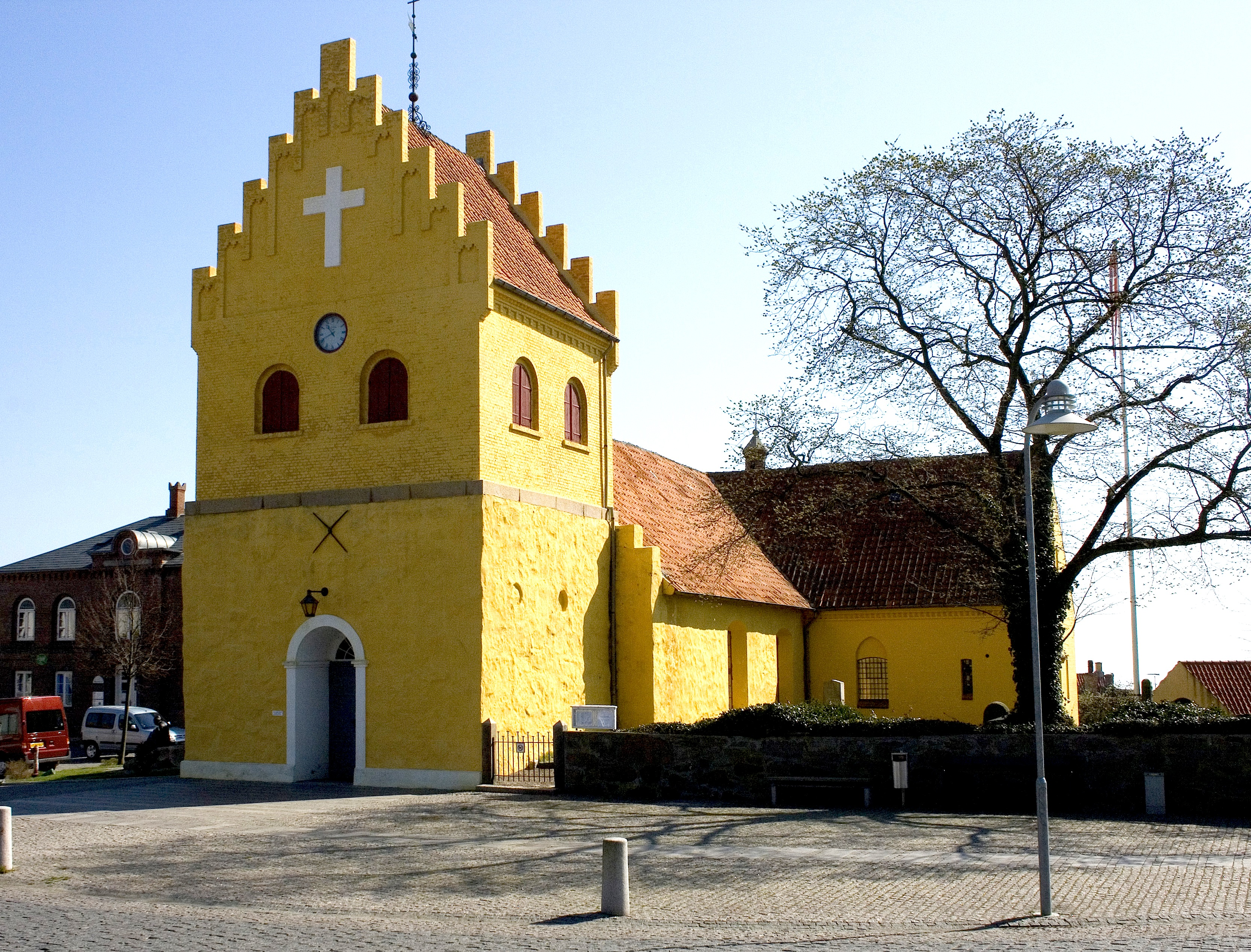
16th century church in Allinge

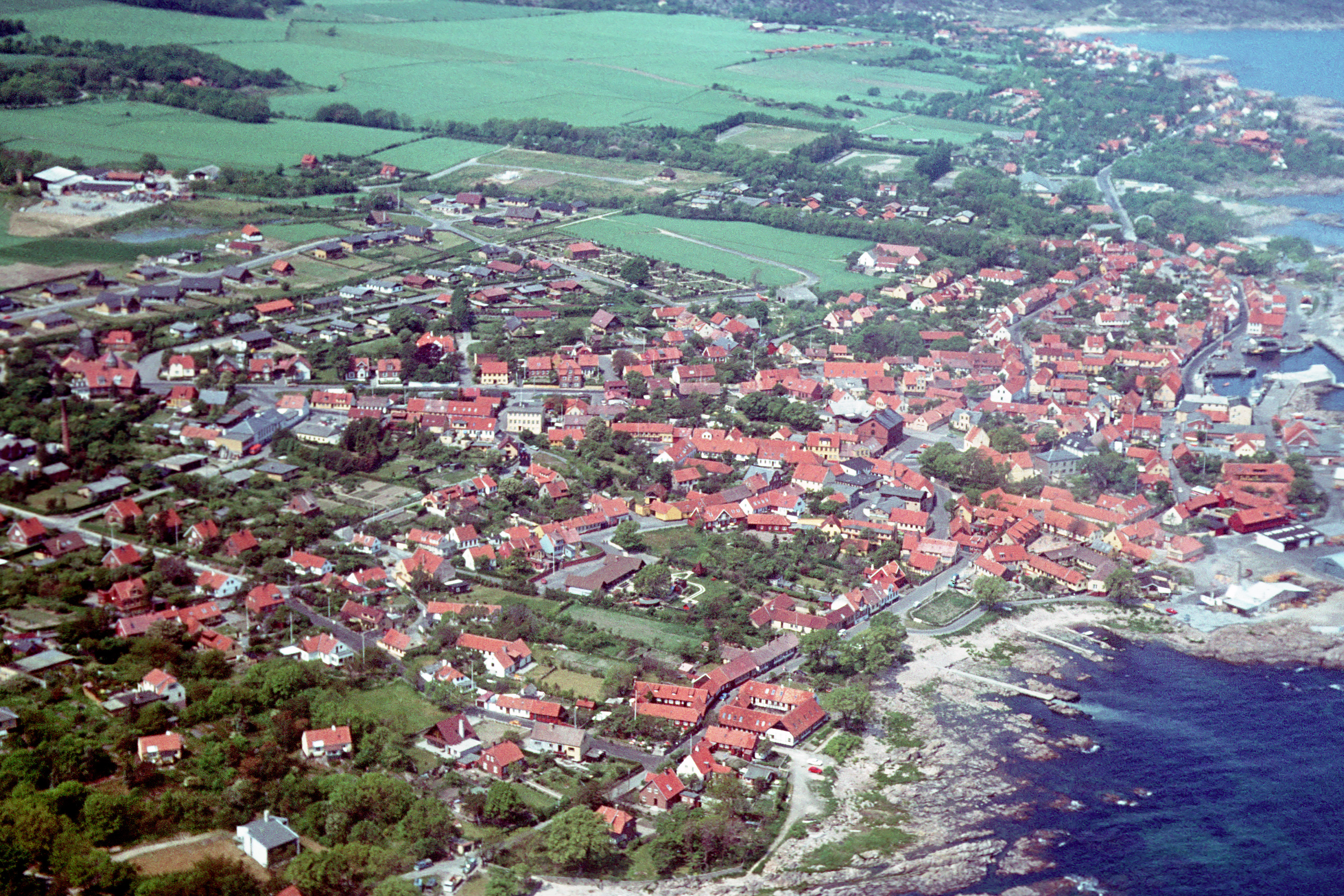
Allinge (aerial view)

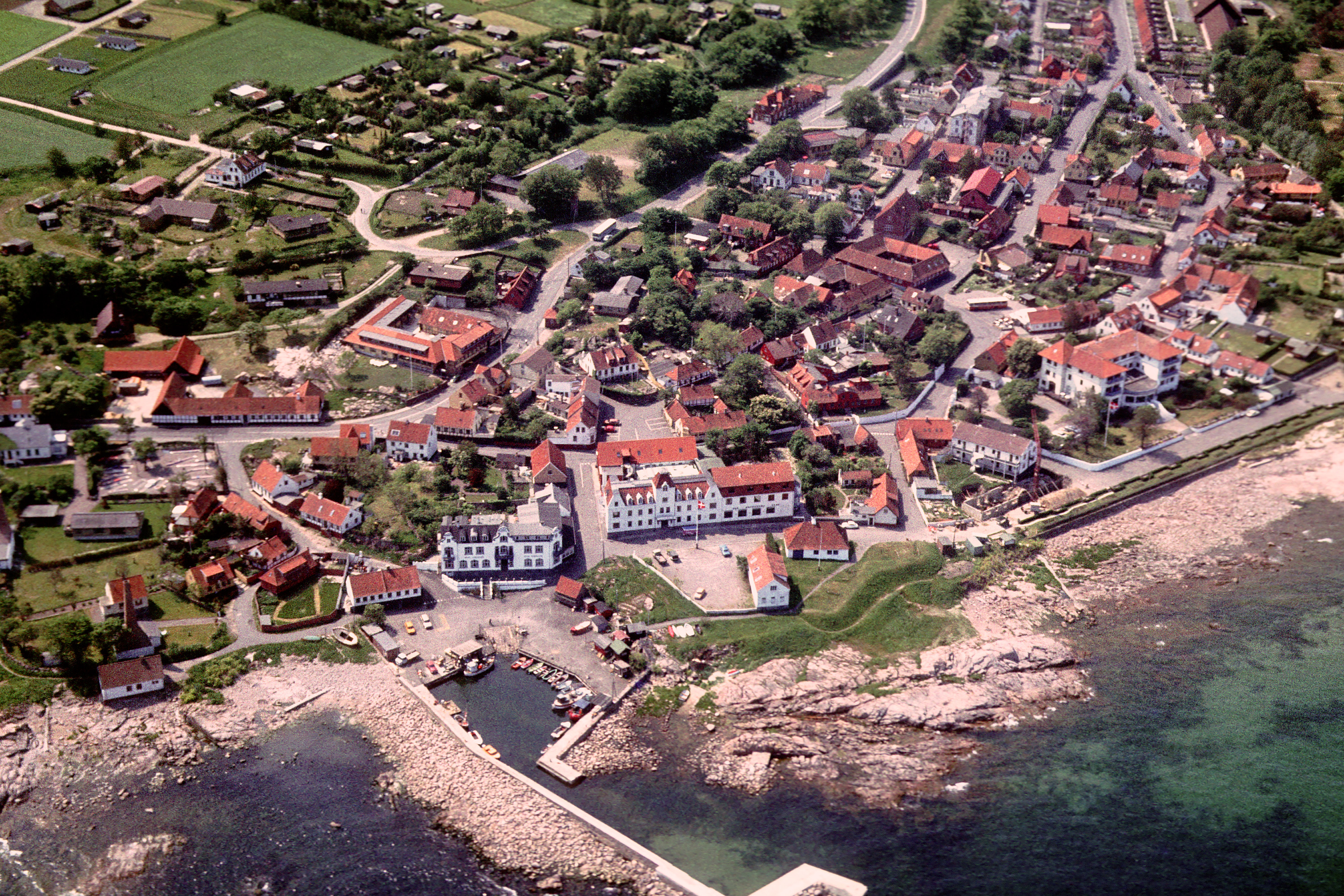
Sandvig (aerial view)

== Allinge Church ==
Allinge Church stands at the centre of Allinge on a hill some 11 metres above sealevel. Initially just a small granite longhouse from the around the 14th century, in 1892 it was completely rebuilt in the Neogothic style.
