= Aakirkeby =

Town in Capital Region, Denmark

- Town
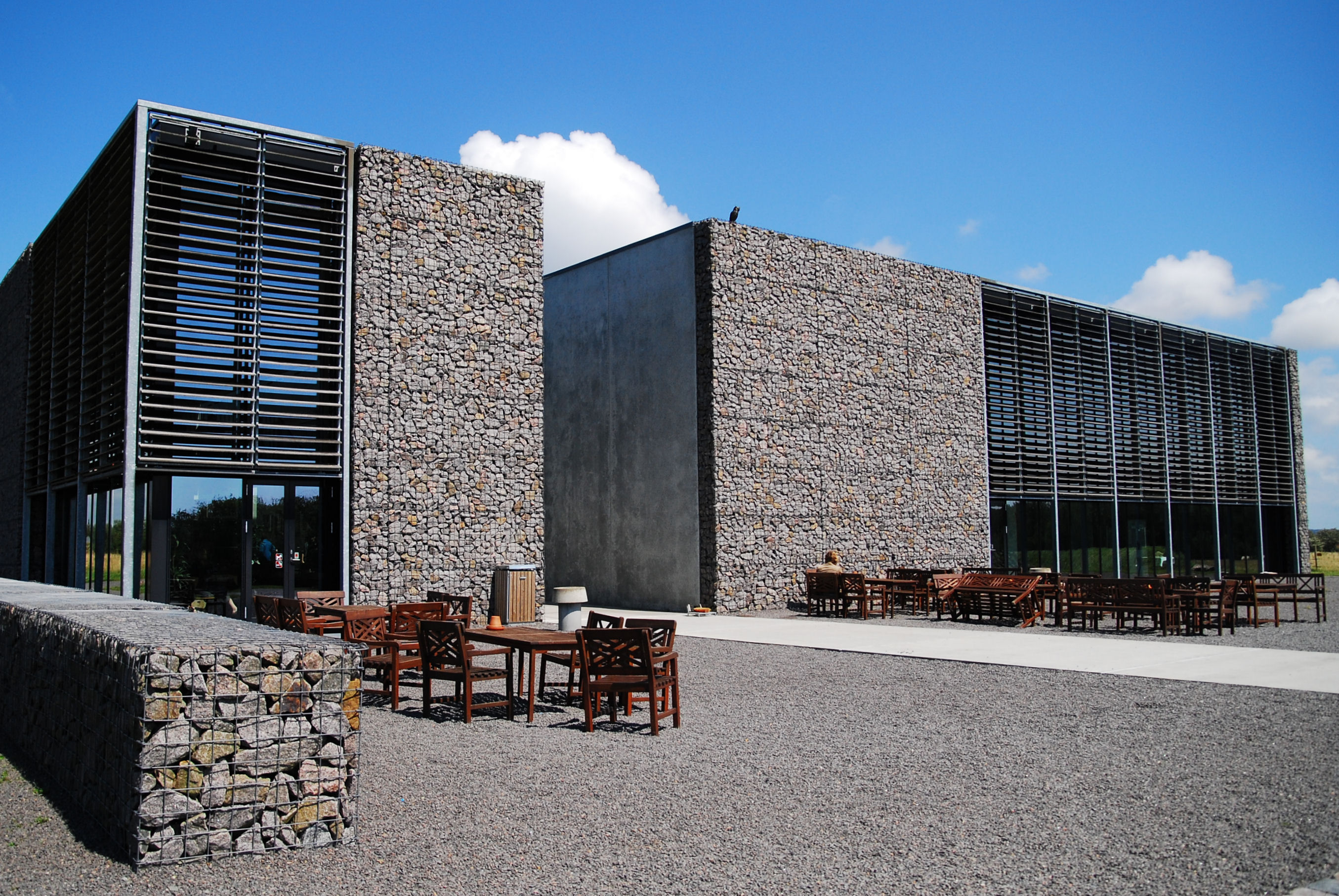
- NaturBornholm museum in Aakirkeby

- Coat of arms

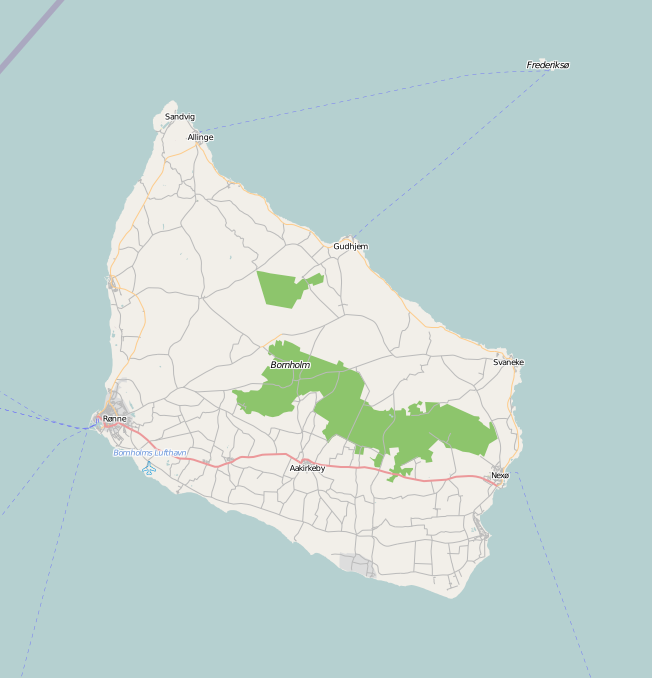
- Location on Bornholm Aakirkeby (Denmark)
- Coordinates: 55°04′14″N 14°55′00″E
- Country: Denmark
- Region: Capital (Hovedstaden)
- Municipality: Bornholm

Area
  - Urban: 1.71 km^{2} (0.66 sq mi)

Population (2026)
  - Urban: 2,109
  - Urban density: 1,230/km^{2} (3,190/sq mi)
- Demonym: Aakirkebybo Åkirkebybo
- Time zone: UTC+1 (CET)
  - Summer (DST): UTC+2 (CEST)
- Website: aakirkeby.tidende.dk/aakirkeby/

Aakirkeby or Åkirkeby is a town in Denmark with a population of 2,109 (1 January 2026). It is the third largest town on the island of Bornholm in the Baltic Sea. It was the main town of the now abolished Aakirkeby Municipality.

The town is situated in the middle of the southern half of Bornholm, between Rønne and Nexø. The Danish TV-station TV2 has a local office (TV2/Bornholm) in Aakirkeby. Aakirkeby could be translated to "Stream Church town", as Å or Aa is a stream. When speaking of the church alone, which dates from the mid-12th century, it is separated into two words: Aa Kirke.

Myreagre Mølle, a whitewashed windmill built in 1865, is located 3 km to the east of Aakirkeby on the road to Nexø.
