= Dueodde Lighthouse =

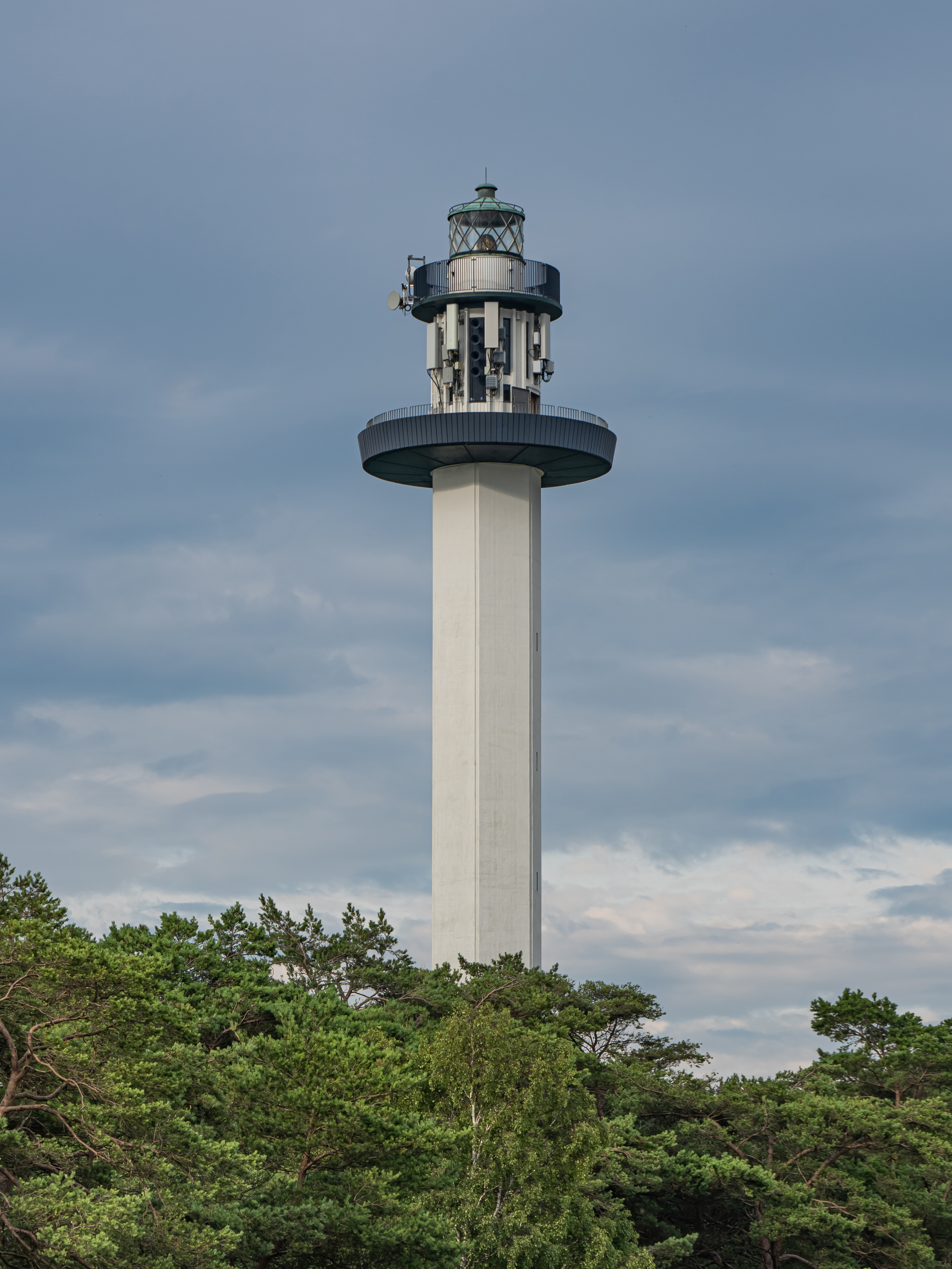
- Dueodde Lighthouse
- Location: Bornholm Island, Denmark
- Coordinates: 54.991835°N 15.074352°E

Tower
- Constructed: 1960–62
- Foundation: Pile foundation
- Construction: Concrete
- Automated: 1962
- Height: 47 metres (154 ft)
- Shape: Hexagonal tower with double balcony and lantern
- Markings: white tower, blue balcony and grey lantern

Light
- First lit: August 1962
- Focal height: 48 metres (157 ft)
- Lens: Fresnel Rotary lens
- Range: 20 nautical miles (37 km)
- Characteristic: Three quick white flashes every 10s

The Dueodde Lighthouse (Danish: Dueodde Fyr) is located on the Danish island of Bornholm. It was built during the years 1960–62 and commissioned on 15 August 1962. It is 47 m (154 ft) in height, with a focal height of 48 m (157 ft). It is the nodal point of the southeast coast line, warning ships to keep away from the extreme southern tip of the island. Dueodde Lighthouse is Denmark's tallest lighthouse and one of the most important lighthouses of the Baltic Sea.

== Geography ==
Bornholm features varied topography, such as Almindingen, Hammeren, Jons Kapel, Paradisbakkerne, Rytterknægten, and Dueodde. The lighthouse was built on the western side of Dueodde's sand dunes, on the island's extreme southern tip.

== Construction ==
The foundation for the tower consisted of 14 m (46 ft) long reinforced concrete piles which involved two harsh winter seasons to complete. Water for the construction was drawn from the Baltic Sea using a 700 m (2,300 ft) long pipe line laid over the hill slope. After the completion of the foundation, the tower construction was taken up and completed speedily using sliding form work procedure to raise the hexagonal shaped cylindrical concrete tower to a height of 45 m (148 ft) without the fixtures. Materials used for construction included 300 m^{3} (11,000 cu ft) of cement concrete and 50 tonnes of reinforcement steel.

== Architecture and fittings ==
The lighthouse is equipped with a Fresnel Rotary lens at a focal height of 48 m. Together with its lantern and double gallery, the tower has a total height of 47 m (154 ft). The Fresnel lens (1886) of the Dueodde Nord lighthouse was transferred to this tower. Electric supply of 1,000 watt is provided by the public utility as the illumination source for the incandescent lamp, which, together with the lens and the height of the burner provides a visual range of about 35 km (22 mi). The lens provides three white flashes every ten seconds. There are 197 steps to the top of the tower from where there is a panoramic view, weather permitting, of the sea and the sandy white beaches. It is the only lighthouse on Bornholm that is open to the public, but at irregular times.

== Gallery ==
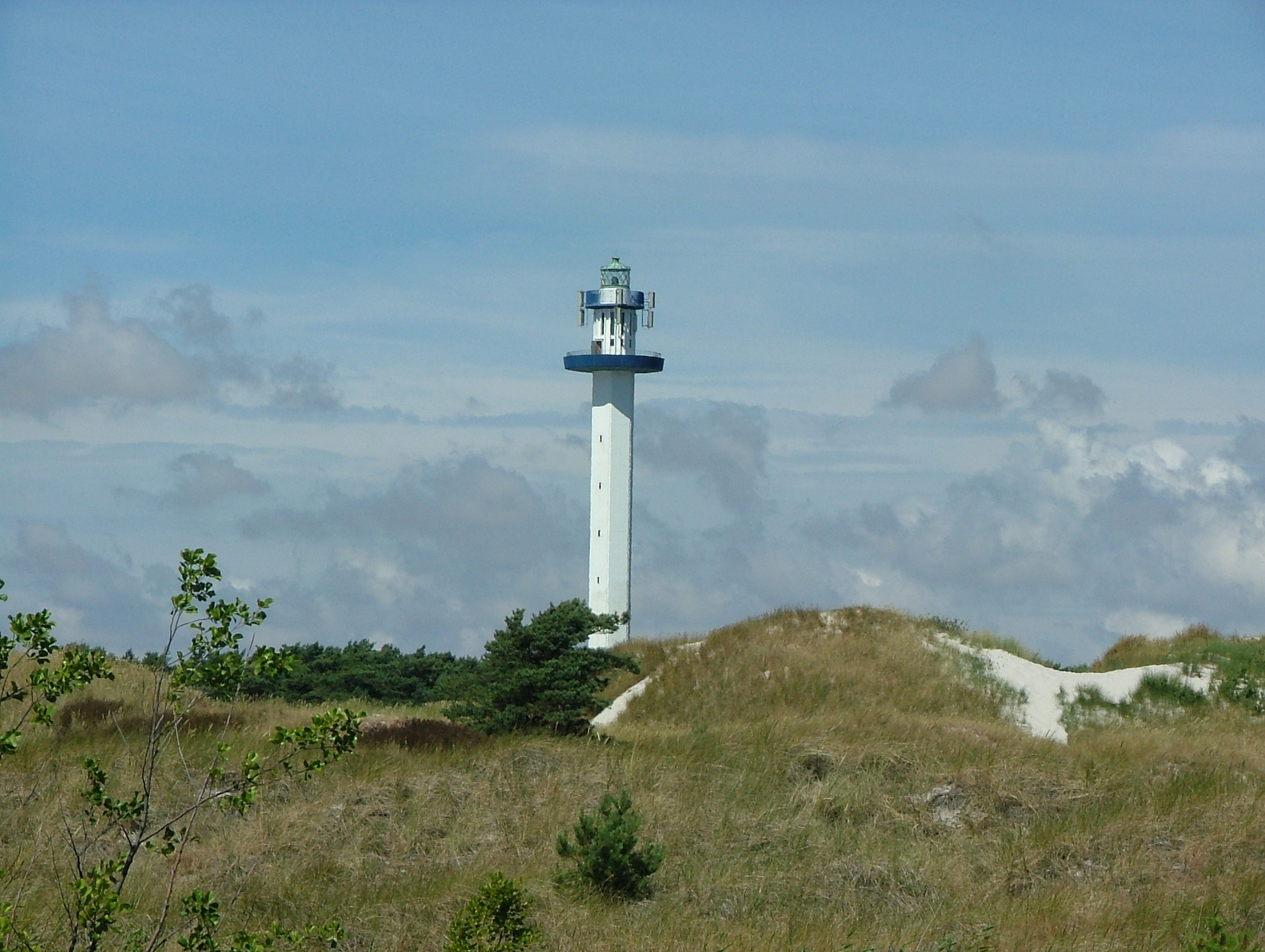

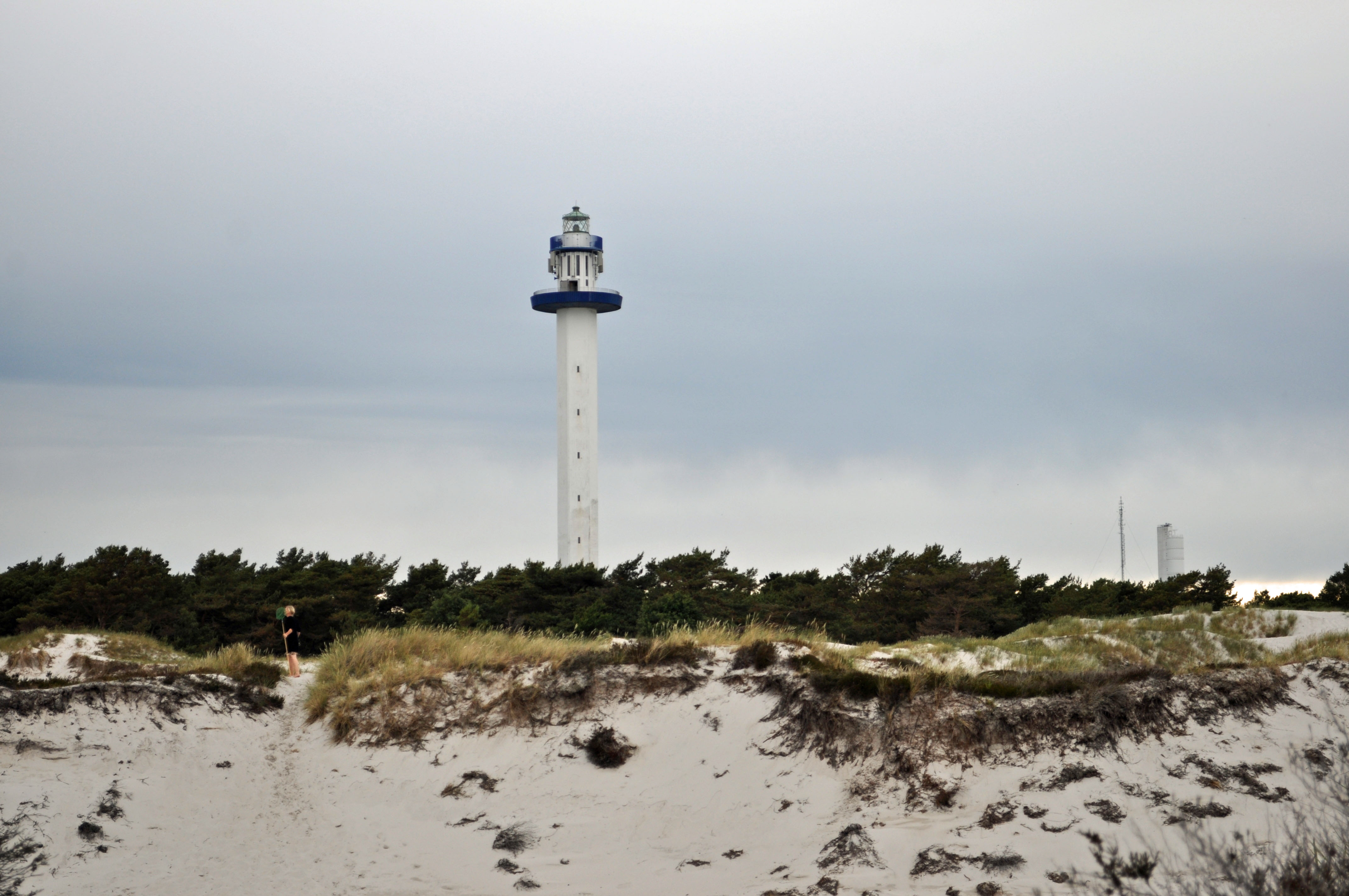

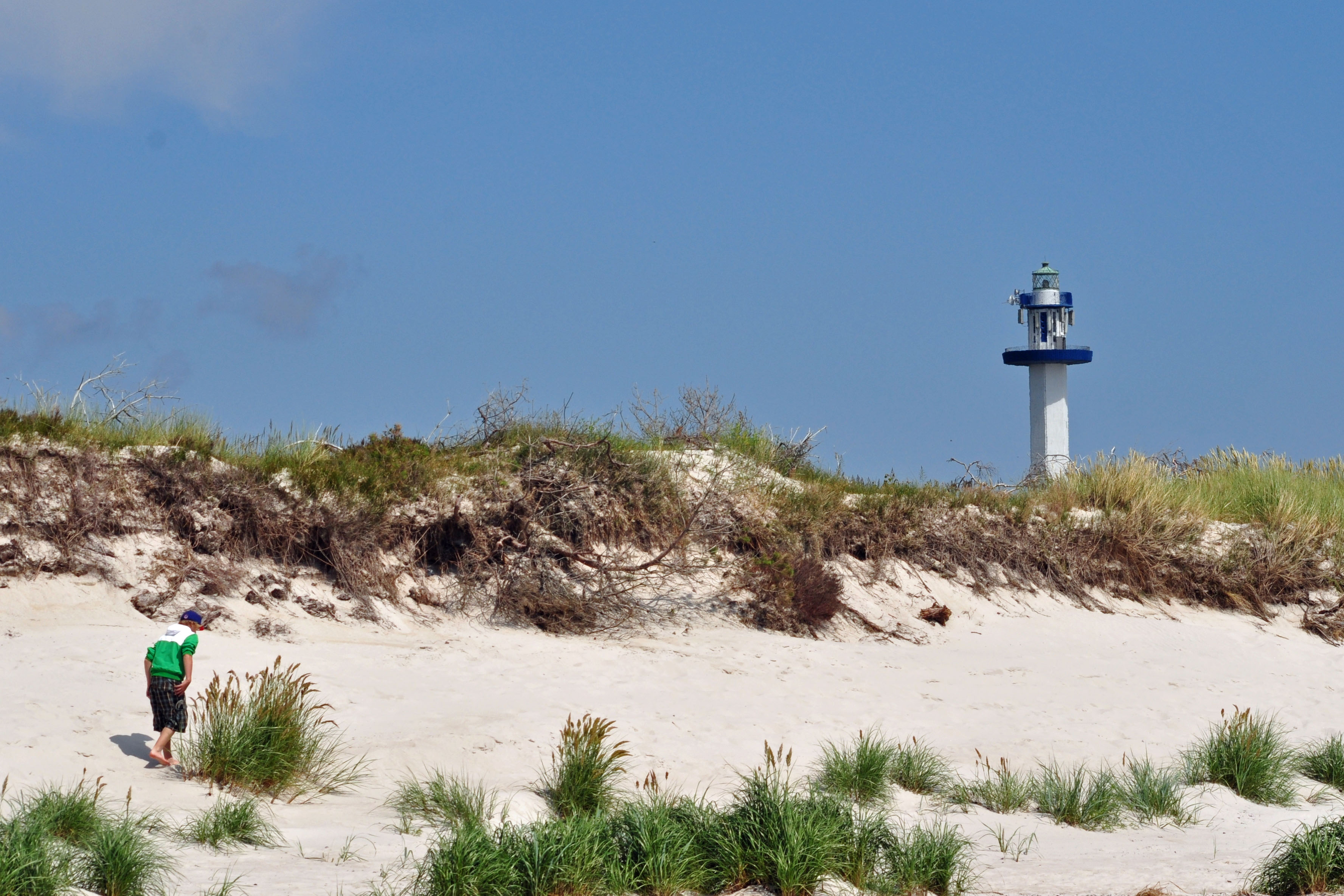

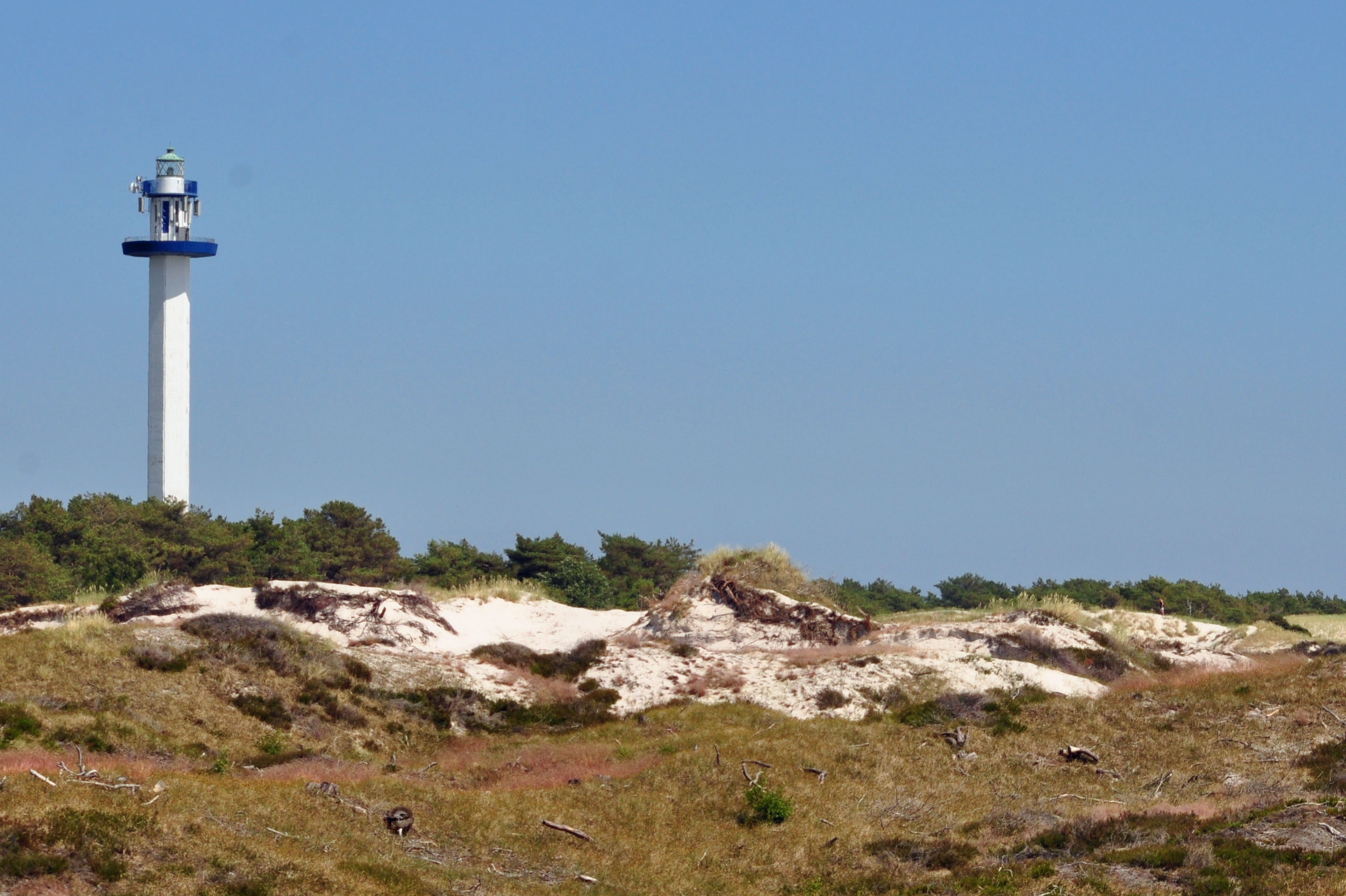

== See also ==
- List of lighthouses and lightvessels in Denmark
