= Rytterknægten =

Highest point on the Danish island of Bornholm

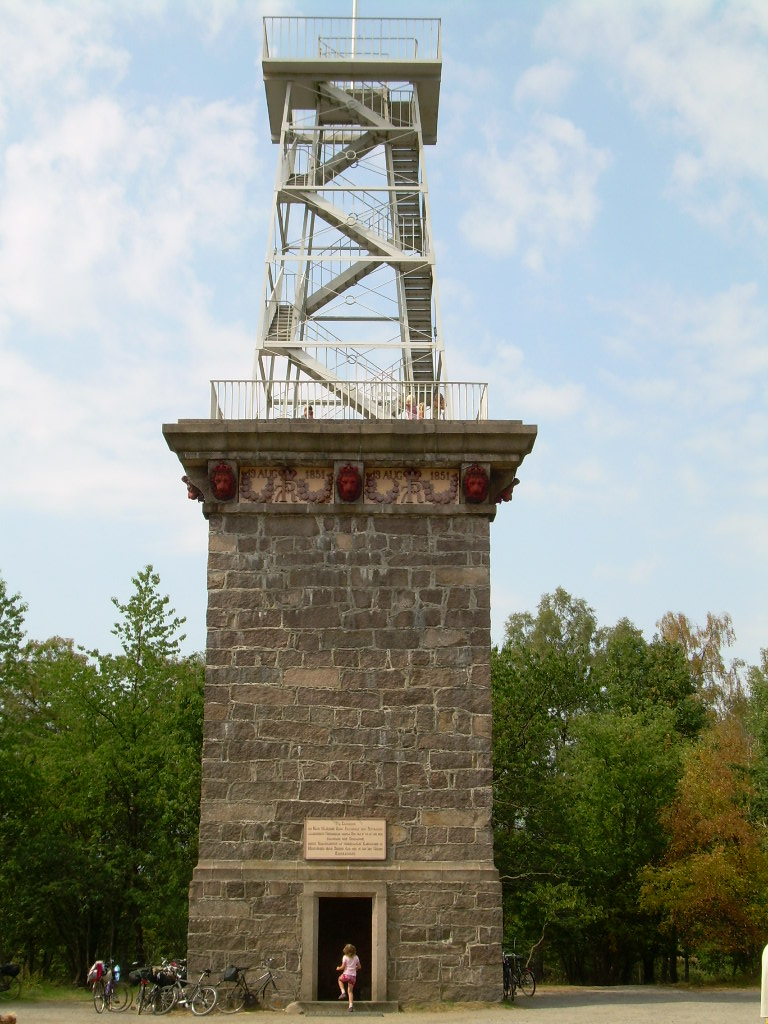
- Memorial tower on Rytterknægten

Highest point
- Elevation: 162 m (531 ft)
- Prominence: 162 m (531 ft)
- Coordinates: 55°6′42.15″N 14°53′21.37″E

Geography
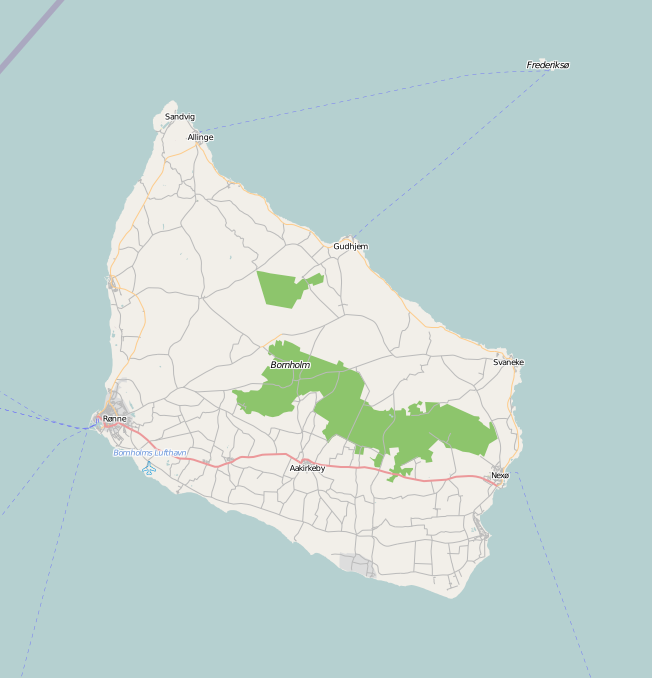
- Location within Bornholm Location within Denmark
- Location: Bornholm, Denmark

Rytterknægten is the highest point on the Danish island of Bornholm at 162 metres (531 ft) above sea level. The bierg is situated on a wooded bedrock of gaiter formations in the middle of Almindingen forest. Aakirkeby is located about 5 kilometres (3.1 mi) to the southeast.

== Etymology ==
Rytterknægten can be translated literally as knight's squire. In times gone by, every knight had a squire who among other things helped him to mount his horse. Those who did not have squires found it convenient to mount from a flat stone such as the one close to the car park. It is thought the stone might be behind the name of the location.

== Geography ==
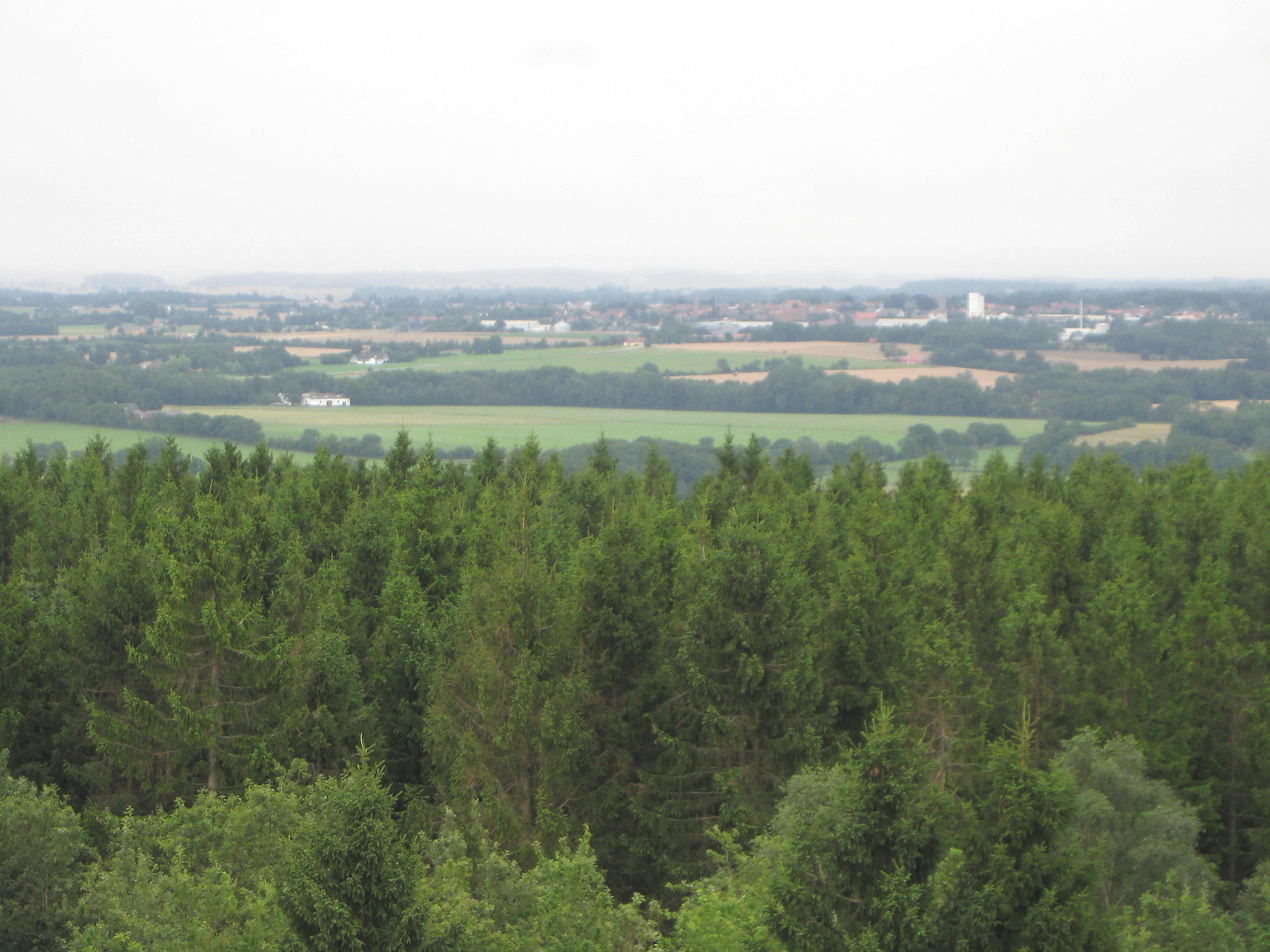
View from the top of Rytterknægten' tower

Bornholm has both varied natural features, such as Almindingen, Hammeren, Jons Kapel, Paradisbakkerne, and Dueodde. Rytterknægten in the Almindingen forest is not far from Ekkodalen ("echo valley") to the east and the Gamleborg castle (Viking fortress) to the southwest. The memorial tower is on the western side of the elevated area. The entire surroundings are covered with dense forest, which has been growing and creating obstructions to the views from the tower.

== Kongemindet ==
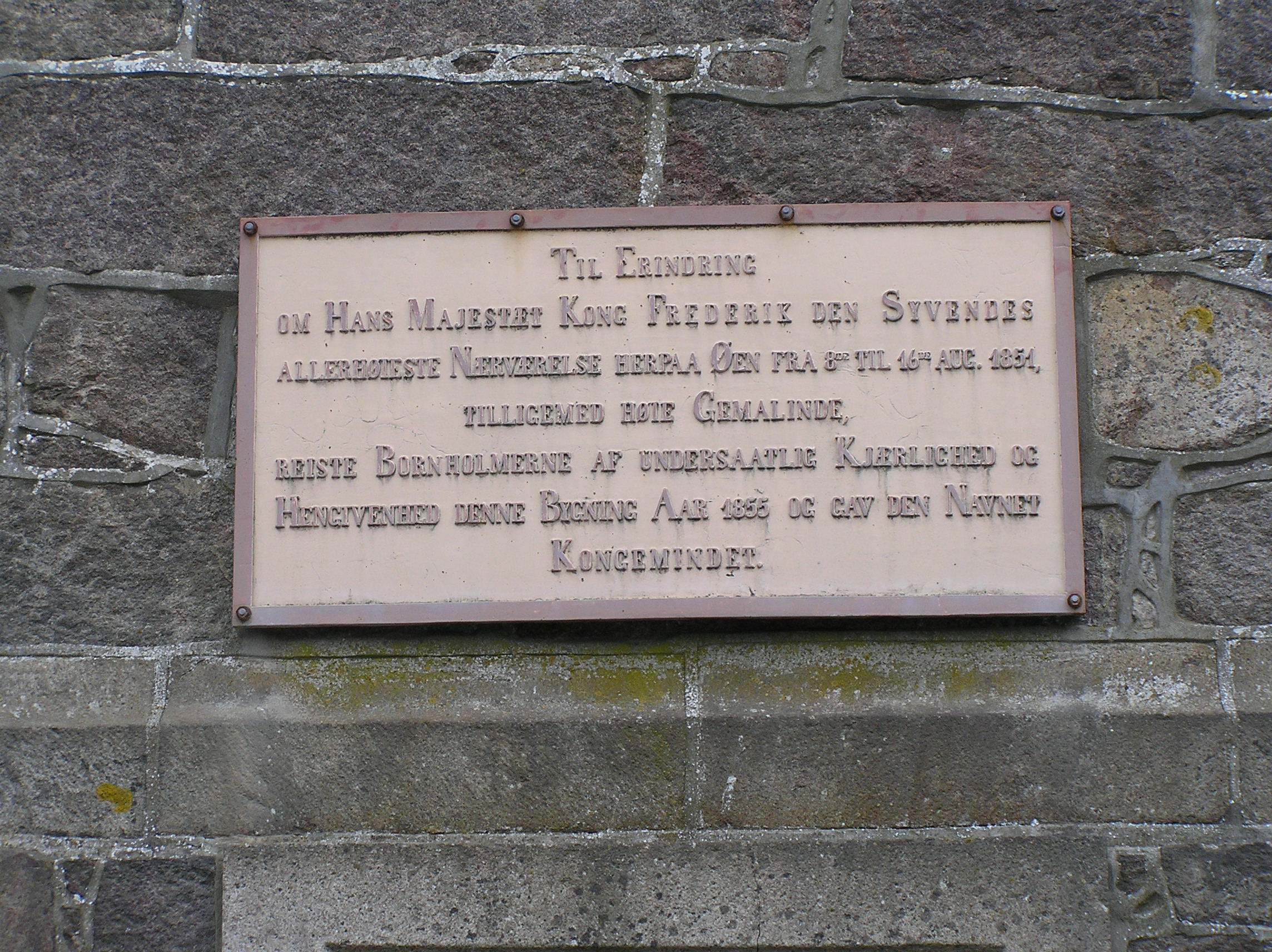
The Kongemindet plaque.

The royal memorial tower, Kongemindet, is located on Rytterknægten. Designed by Gottlieb Bindesbøll, it commemorates the 1851 visit of Frederick VII of Denmark and Countess Danner. The 12.6 metres (41 ft) structure was built by appreciative Bornholmers in 1856, financed entirely with Bornholmer resident donations as reverence to the King and the Danish royal house. It bears an inscription expressing the Bornholmers' thanks for the visit, stating that it would be called Kongemindet ("royal memorial"). Translated into English, the memorial text on the plaque reads:

"In remembrance of his Majesty King Frederik VII's highest presence on this island from 8 till 16 August 1851 with his wife, the Bornholmers out of subjectorial reverence erected this building in the year 1855 and gave it the name Kongemindet."

The tower's granite masonry is decorated with lion heads, and originally had one staircase. As the forest grew higher, obscuring the view, the tower was extended in 1899 by steel scaffolding a further 9 metres (30 ft), reaching a height at the top of 184 metres (604 ft) above sea level, which marks the highest point in Denmark, same as the Bavnehøj in Jutland. The design of the steel structure above the masonry structure is unusual in that it has two staircases - one to go up and the other to come down - which has limited the availability of space at the top of the tower. During the World War II, the Germans added a radio transmitter, reaching a further 60 metres (200 ft) in height but this was later removed. The tower has also been used for radar equipment, especially to monitor Russian movements during the Cold War. The tower is used in the spring for ornithological observations. The tower, with views over the entire island, is open to visitors free of charge during daylight hours throughout the year.

== See also ==
- List of islands by highest point
