= List of protected areas of Bornholm =

This list of protected areas of Bornholm is a list of protected areas of Bornholm, Denmark.

== List ==
Image	Locality	Size	Year	Coordinates	Description	Source
	Arnager kyst og overdrev					Ref
	Årsdale–Nexø coast	69 ha	1978			Ref
	Bølshavn–MSaltuna coast	47 ha	1947–76			Ref
	Dueodde		1936–82			Ref
	Døndalen and Helligdomsklipperne	74ha	1913–1975			Ref
	Ekkodalen and Almindingen	210 ha	1948–73			Ref
	Gildesbo og Birkely					Ref
	Gudhjem Plantage and kysten mod Melsted	1928–67				Ref
	Gyldensådalen and Hellig Kvinde	1946–80				Ref
	Hadeborg Bakke	13 ha	1989			Ref
	Hammerknuden	167 ha	1918–67			Ref
	Hasle Lystskov og Hasle Nordkyst	1972–2004				Ref
	Hundsemyre	02 ha	1977			Ref
	Kastellet, Galløkken og Onsbæk Plantage					Ref
	Læså		1973–77			Ref
	Madsebakke and Storløkke					Ref
	Nexø Sydstrand and Balka Lyng		1946–2003			Ref
	Nylars Plantage					Ref
	Raghammer Skydeterræn og Odde		1948–68			Ref
	Rævedal					Ref
	Risen Skov med Bøgebjerg		1999			Ref
	Rutsker Højlyng og Spelling Mose	1930–83				Ref
	Svaneke Church					Ref
	Svaneke Nordskov and Gule Hald	1800 ha	1973			Ref
	Svartingedalen		1927			Ref
	Svejbjerg					Ref
	Ugleenge ved Aakirkeby					Ref
	Vester og Øster Sømark					Ref
