= Jons Kapel =

Rock bluff in Denmark on Bornholm's west coast

Coordinates: 55°13′50″N 14°43′32″E

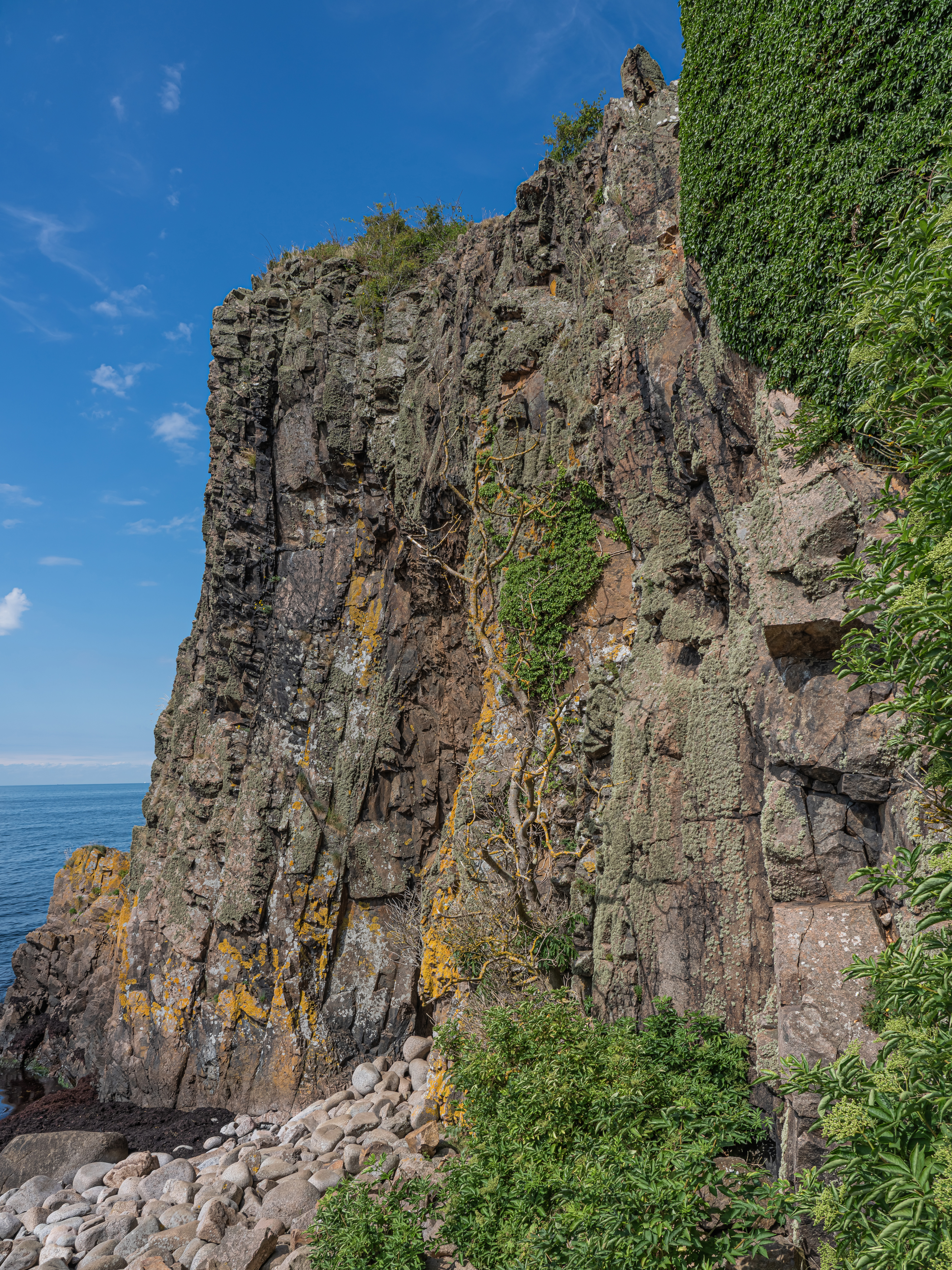
- Jons Kapel Cliff

Highest point
- Elevation: 41 m (135 ft)

Geography
- Location: Bornholm, Denmark

Geology
- Mountain type: Granite

Jons Kapel ("John's Chapel") is a rock bluff in Denmark on Bornholm's west coast, about 7 kilometres (4.3 mi) north of Hasle. The formations are the result of the waves beating against the rock at a time when the sea level was considerably higher than it is today. The cliff is 135 feet (41 m) in height. Named after a hermit who resided on the bluff, Jon's caves are visible from the beach below the rocks.

== Geography ==
Bornholm has both varied natural features, such as Jons Kapel, Almindingen, Hammeren, Paradisbakkerne, Rytterknægten, and Dueodde, as well as Denmark's tallest lighthouse. The rocky cliffs of Jons Kapel, which give a panoramic view of the west coast of the island, are reached from the car park on Jons Kapelvej by descending a steep path beside a little stream called Askebækken. Jons Kapel can be seen from the beach, north of the point where the path reaches the coast. The cliffs consist of Vang granite, named after the fishing village of Vang, just to the north. The cliff has several caves. Jon's Cave is high above the sea. North of the cave, there is an almost vertical rockface known as Hvidkleven (White Cliff). The caves to the south are known as Jons Sovekammer (Jon's Bedroom), Jons Sakristi, Jons Spisestue (Jon's Dining Room) and Jons Madkælder (Jon's Food Cellar). The bluff has been identified into three climbing grades depending on the difficulty level, at 10 metres (33 ft) intervals. Kangaroo Point, at 10 metres (33 ft) from the base level, is Grade 3, and is one of the better and secure routes. The second level, called Alle Veje fører til Hasle ("All roads lead to Hasle"), is also Grade 3 .The third, known as the Udsigten ("the prospect"), is Grade 4.

== Legend ==
According to legend, Jon was a hermit, sent to Bornholm to bring Christianity to the islanders. He settled in a cave on the cliff. Bornholmers were curious to see who Jon was, so they visited him and he told them stories from the Bible. Eventually, there were so many visitors that there was not enough room in his cave. In order for everyone to hear him, Jon crawled up on the cliff into a natural vantage point known as Prædikestolen ("the pulpit"). It is said that he also preached to the sea gulls and surf waters of the sea.
