= Hammeren =

Promontory on Bornholm, Denmark

- IUCN category III (natural monument or feature)
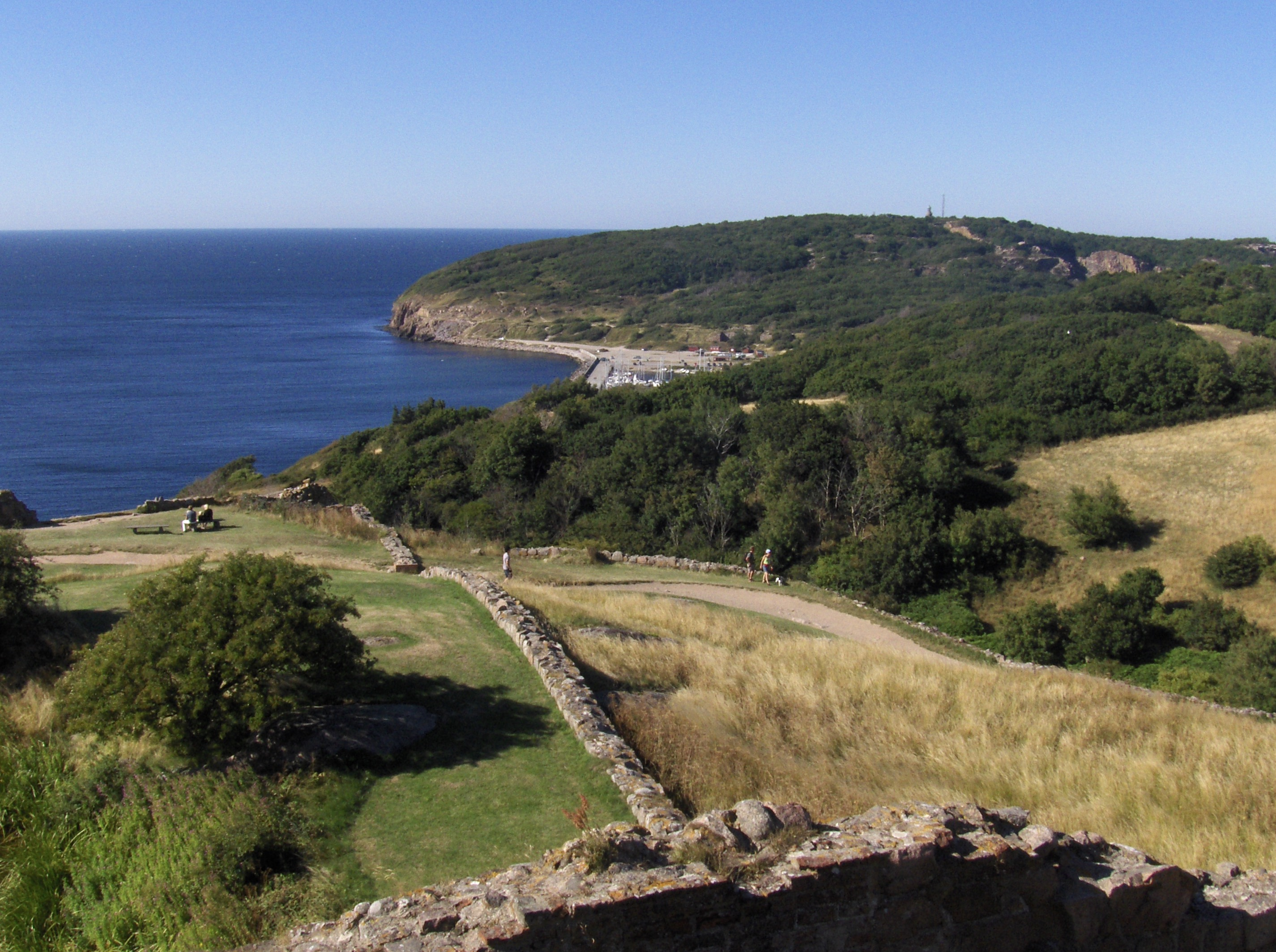
- Hammeren seen from Hammershus

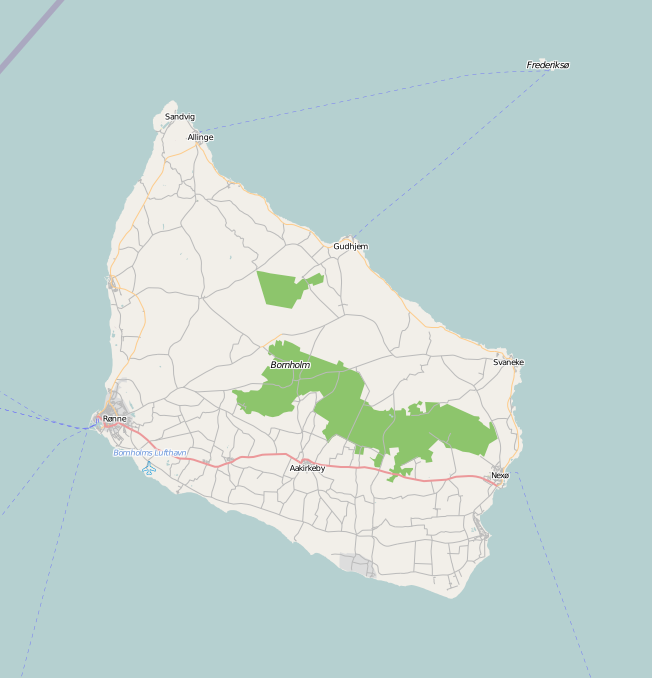
- Location within Bornholm
- Location: Bornholm island in Denmark
- Coordinates: 55°17′40″N 14°46′39″E
- Area: 600

Hammeren (also Hammerknuden; meaning, "hammerhead-shaped crag of granite") is a protected area and promontory in Denmark on the northernmost point of Bornholm island. It projects into Sæne Bugt bay in the Baltic Sea. The area includes Hammersø, the largest lake on the island and the only tarn in Denmark, and a hill, 276 feet (84 m) in height, named Stejlebjerg (or Stieleberg). It is steep to the southwest but slopes gradually to the northeast, and is separated from the rest of the land by a valley.

== Geography ==
Bornholm has varied natural features, such as Almindingen, Jons Kapel, Paradisbakkerne, Rytterknægten, and Dueodde. Hammeren has cliffs towering 86 feet (26 m) from the Baltic Sea and a rift valley separating it from the surroundings. It covers a rocky area of granite formations (considered one of the best examples of the kind) extending over 182 hectares (450 acres) and including a number of caves. The area, which was once covered with heather and bracken, was laid bare by heavy grazing.

Hammeren features a large lake, Hammersø, the largest on the island, and a deep pond, Opalsø, surrounded by the rocky slopes of a former granite quarry. Separated by a rift valley, the area is composed of about 50% rocks, 25% forest and 25% cultivated land. All of Hammeren is now a protected nature reserve. There are a number of walking trails connecting Sandvig and the ruins of Hammershus. The path along the northern rocky face leads to Hammerodde Fyr, a lighthouse located at the northern tip, before proceeding along the coastal path towards the south east to the harbour, Hammeren Havn.

== Landmarks ==
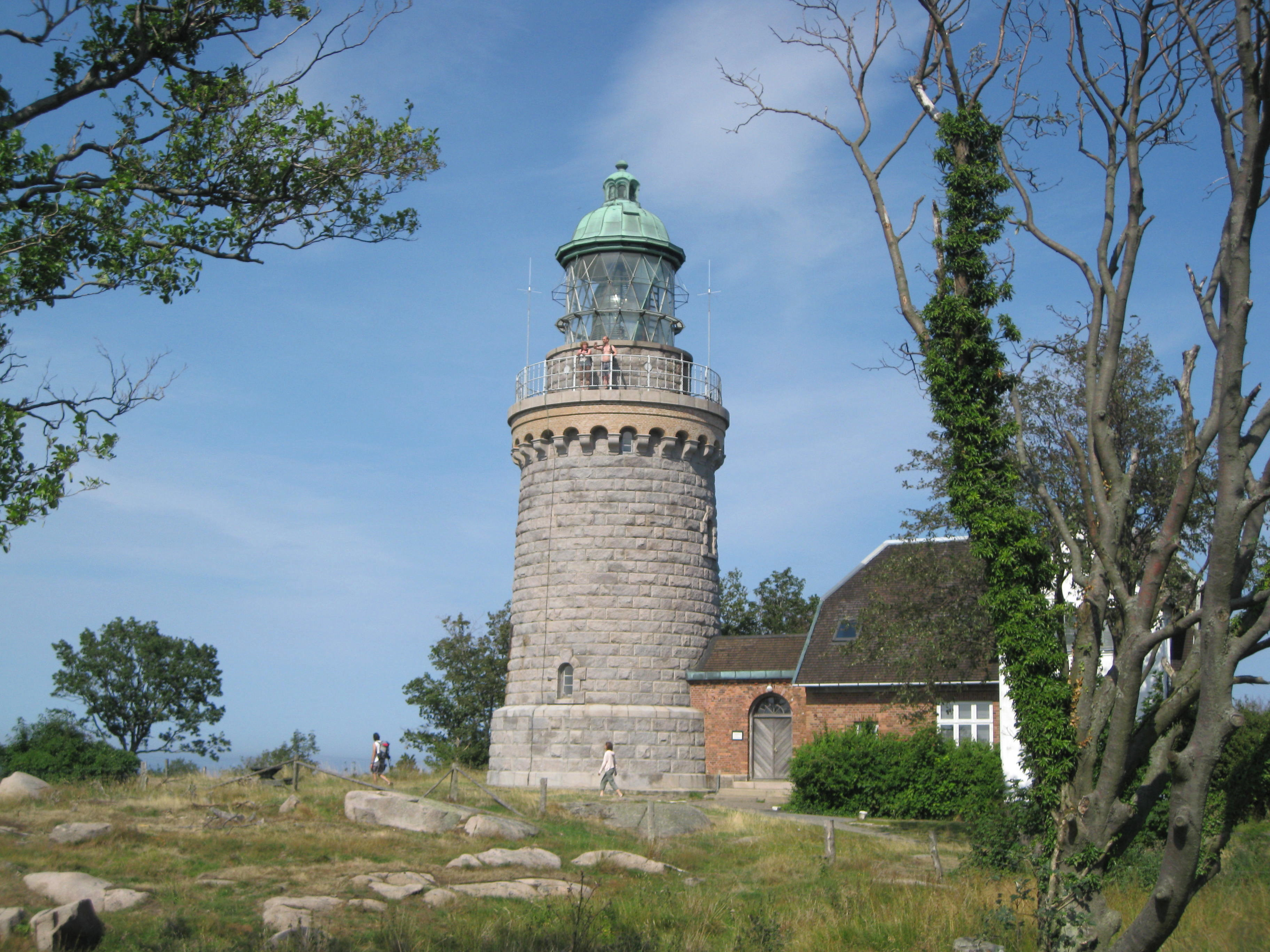
Hammeren Fyr Lighthouse.

The thirteenth-century castle of Hammershus, Northern Europe's largest medieval fortification, is located just to the south. There are several quarries in the vicinity. Trails lead from nearby Hammerhus to a nature area named Slotslyngen. In addition to Dueodde Lighthouse, Denmark's tallest, there are several others on the island, such as Hammeren Lighthouse, inactive since 1990. On a clear day, views extend to the Swedish coast.

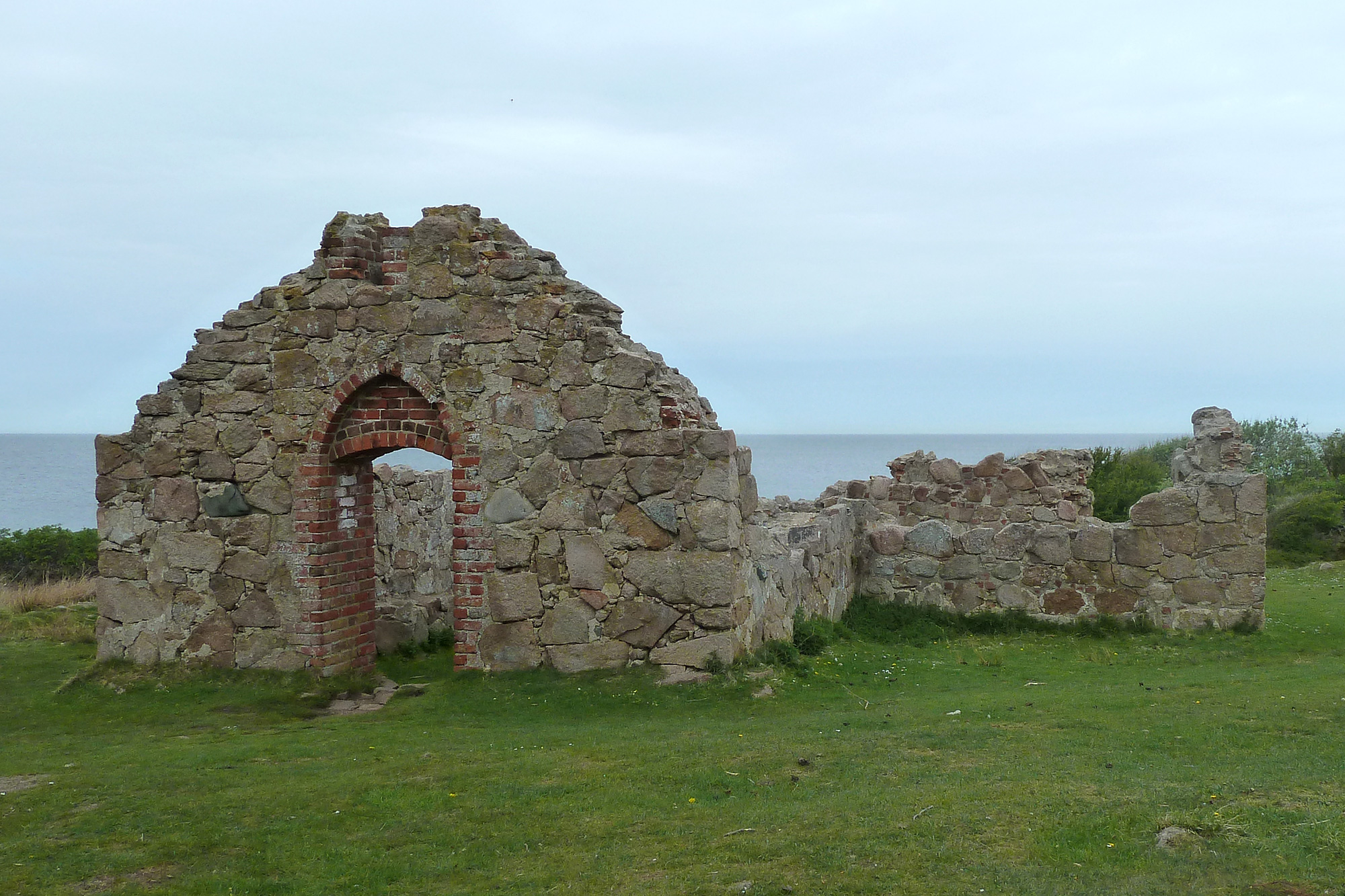
Salomons Kapel

Close to the coast, to the south of the Hammeren Lighthouse, the ruins of Salomons Kapel (Solomon's Chapel) can be seen. Thought to have been built by the Archbishop of Lund in the beginning of the fourteenth century, it was named after St Solomon, a Dominican friar. It was built of brick and hewn boulders in two stages: first the small rectangular church and later the porch area to the south. Remains of the altar and of brick benches along the walls can be seen. The chapel was constructed in connection with Bornholm's herring trade with the Hanseatic cities of Hamburg and Lübeck from the thirteenth to fifteenth centuries.
