= Hammersø =

Lake in Bornholm Regional Municipality, Denmark

- Hammer Lake, Hammer Sø
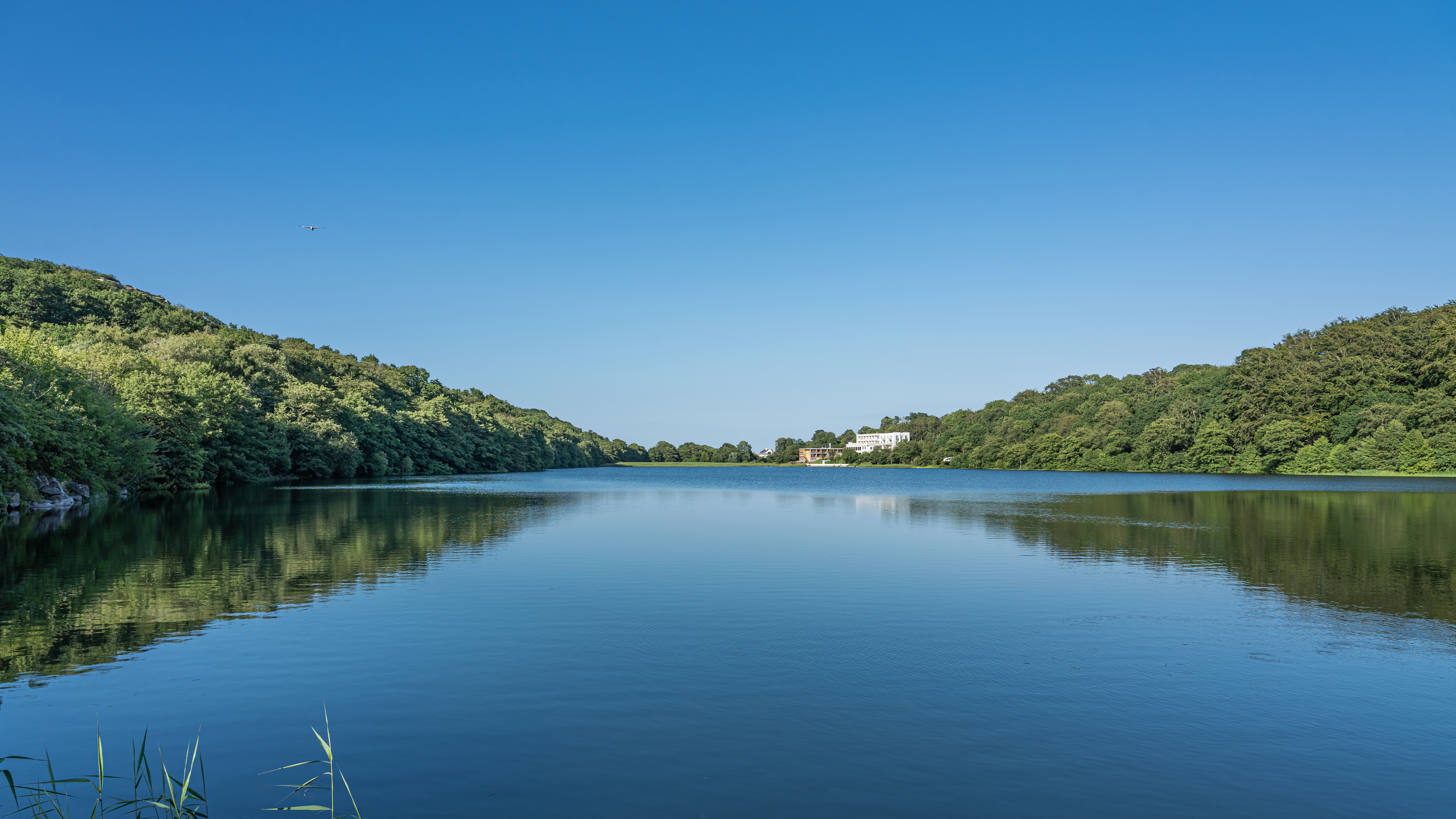

- Location within Denmark
- Location: Bornholm, Denmark
- Coordinates: 55°16′58″N 14°45′54″E
- Type: Tarn
- Max. length: 650 metres (2,130 ft)
- Max. width: 150 metres (490 ft)
- Surface area: 10.3 hectares (25 acres)
- Max. depth: 13 metres (43 ft)

Hammersø (English: Hammer Lake), or Hammer Sø, is the largest lake on the island of Bornholm and the only tarn in Denmark. It is located in a valley in Hammeren, the northernmost point of the island. A narrow isthmus separates the lake from Opalsø, an artificial lake formed in a granite quarry which was closed in 1970.

== Geography ==
The lake is about 650 metres (2,130 ft) long and 150 metres (490 ft) wide, covering an area of 10.3 hectares (25 acres), and reaches a maximum depth of 13 metres (43 ft). Its encatchment area is approximately 133 hectares (330 acres), consisting of about 50% rocks, 25% forest and 25% cultivated land.
