= Lilleborg, Bornholm =

Lilleborg
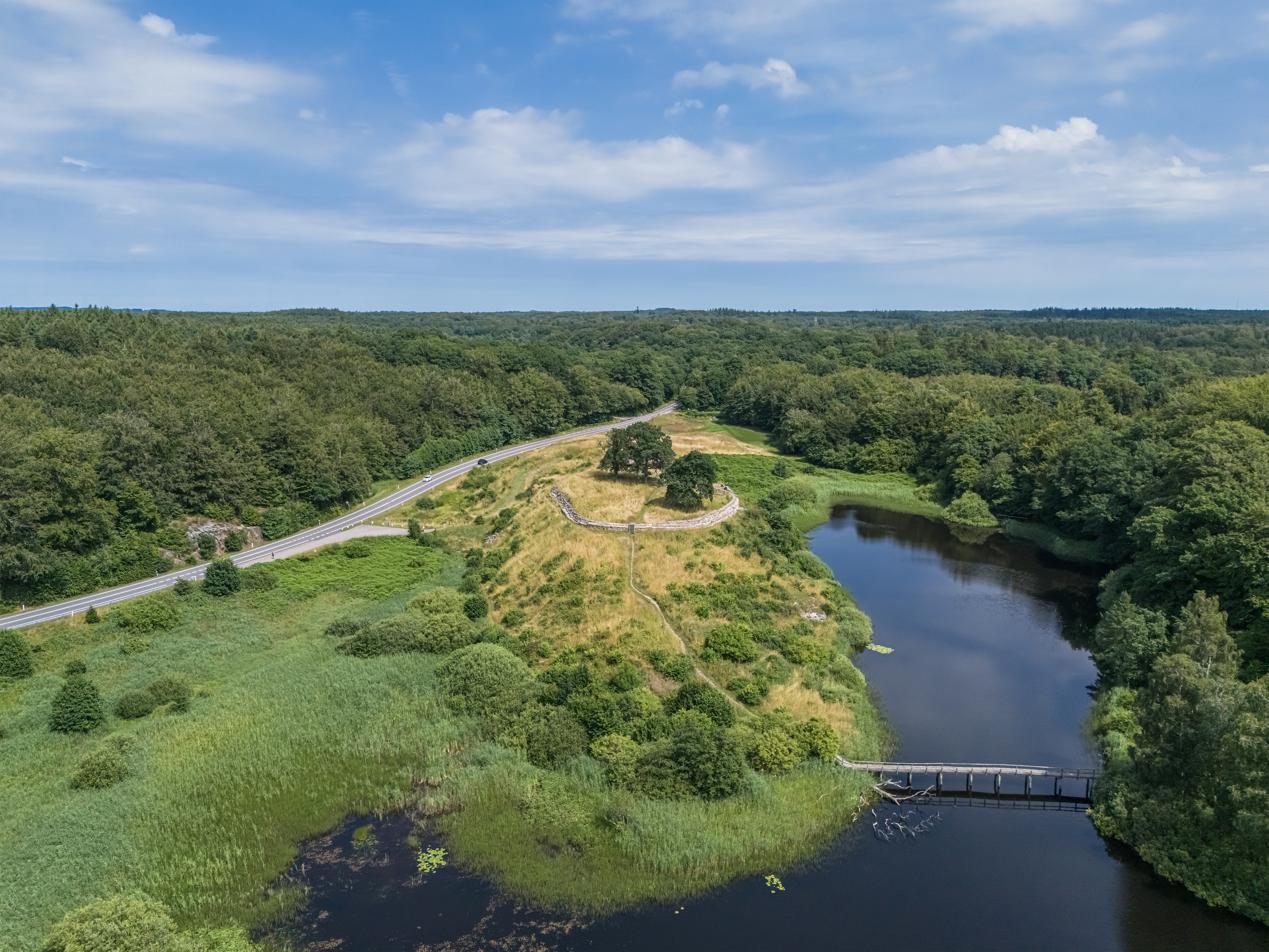
- Aerial view of Lilleborg, Bornholm

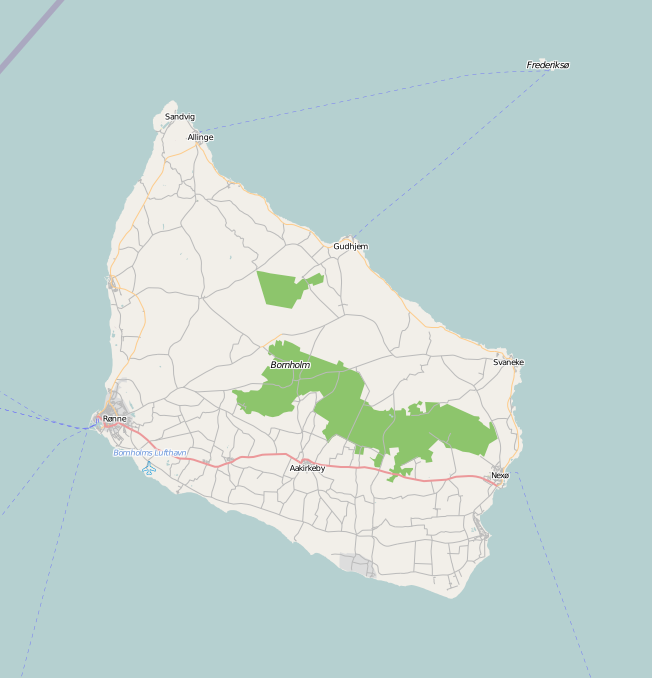
- Location in Bornholm
- 55°07′08″N 14°53′51″E
- Type: Castle
- Location: Bornholm, Denmark

History
- Built: 12th century

Lilleborg is a ruined castle in the Almindingen forest in the centre of the Danish island of Bornholm. It is situated close to the main road from Rønne to Svaneke. Of the Danish fortresses built in the 12th century, Lilleborg most closely resembles those of Saxon architectural style.

In 2025, researchers from the National Museum of Denmark and Bornholms Museum concluded that some sort of fortification was already located on the site in the 4th century. Remains of the earlier Iron Age fortification were discovered in 2010.

== History ==
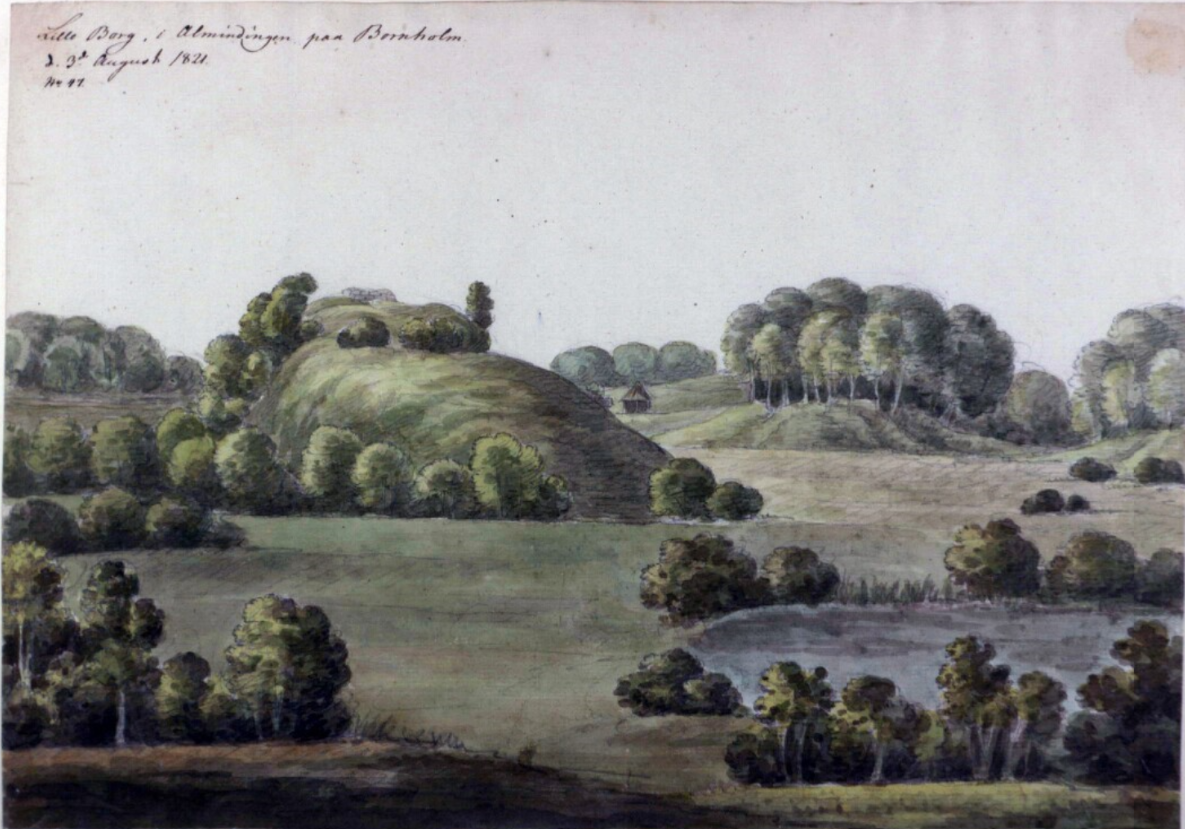
Ole Jørgen Rawert: Lilleborg, 3 August 1821

The castle was probably built in the middle of the 12th century as a royal fortress. It appears to have replaced the much larger fortress of Gamleborg which was only 700 metres (2,300 ft) away. The move could be explained by the fact that in 1149, three-fourths of Bornholm had been surrendered to Eskil, archbishop of Lund. As a result, King Sweyn III wanted to establish his own seat of power on the remaining fourth of the island. While it could not be compared to the archbishop's Hammershus, Lilleborg was nevertheless a fine stronghold and appears to have been easier to defend than the much larger Gamleborg. There is evidence suggesting the fortress burnt down in 1259 when Prince Jaromar of Rügen stormed and destroyed the "king's stronghold" on Bornholm. However, coins minted after that date have been found, indicating it was inhabited after its storming.

== Architecture ==
Lilleborg's construction inland rather than on the coast has been compared to that of Refshaleborg on Borgø in Maribo lake. It had a large tower, 9.5 metres (31 ft) square, protecting the entrance to the courtyard. Its walls were 2.4 metres (7 ft 10 in) thick and from the top it was easy to hit anyone trying to attack. The fortress is further protected by a curtain wall which follows the cliff tops around the oval plateau. The interior was some 76 metres (249 ft) long and 41 metres (135 ft) wide. When its defenses were obsolete, the fort's stones were re-purposed for other buildings. From 2006 to 2011, restoration work was carried out at Lilleborg.

== Grounds ==
It was built on the top of a rocky hill, 16 metres (52 ft) high and, at the time, completely surrounded by the Borresø lake. It was accessed via a wooden bridge on the south side of the hill which led to a steep path up to the fortress. Positioned away from the coast, as hill forts might be, Lilleborg was characterized as being suitable as a hiding place during sudden attacks, but not efficient for protecting the coastline.
