= List of forests in Denmark =

This is a list of forests in Denmark.

== Overview ==
In the year 2000, Denmark had 4860 km^{2}, corresponding to 11% of the Danish territory. Of this, 69% was located in Jutland while 31% was located on the islands. 63% was coniferous forest while 37% was broadleaf forest.

== The 10 largest forests in Denmark ==
In 2004 the Danish Forest and Nature Agency published this list of the 10 largest forests in Denmark:

Forests of Denmark by area
Rank	Forest	Area (km^{2})	Location
1.	Silkeborgskovene	224.00	Central Jutland
2.	Rold Skov	80.00	Himmerland
3.	Klosterheden	64.00	Western Jutland
4.	Gribskov	55.00	Northern Zealand
5.	Almindingen	50.00	Bornholm
6.	Kompedal Plantage–Alhedens Skov	46.00	Central Jutland
7.	Løvenholm, Fjeld, Ramten and others	43.00	Central Jutland
8.	Vesterskov, Thorsø, Sønderskov, Rye Nørreskov and others	41.00	Central Jutland
9.	Skramsø, Skærsø, Lyngsbæk and others	40.00	Djursland
10.	Slagelseskovene	39.00	Central Zealand
10.	Tvorup, Nystrup, Vandet plantager	39.00	Thy

== Forests in Denmark ==
- Almindingen
- Blåbjerg Klitplantage
- Brøndbyskoven
- Corselitze Skov
- Donnerup Plantage
- Elmelunde Kohave
- Greve Skov
- Gribskov
- Gråstenskovene
- Hammer Bakker
- Hareskoven
- Hesede Skov
- Himmelev Skov
- Jægersborg Dyrehave
- Klejsskov
- Klelund Plantage
- Lundby Bakker
- Marielundsskoven
- Marselisborgskovene
- Moesgård Skov
- Ridefogedlukke
- Riis Skov
- Rold Skov
- Rosenholm Skov
- Rørt Skov
- Skagen Klitplantage
- Store Dyrehave
- Tisvilde Hegn
- Tranum Aktieplantage
- Troldbjerg Skov
- True Skov
- Vandmose Skov
- Vestskoven
- Østerild Klitplantage
