= Almindingen =

One of the largest forests in Denmark

Coordinates: 55.124°N 14.925°E

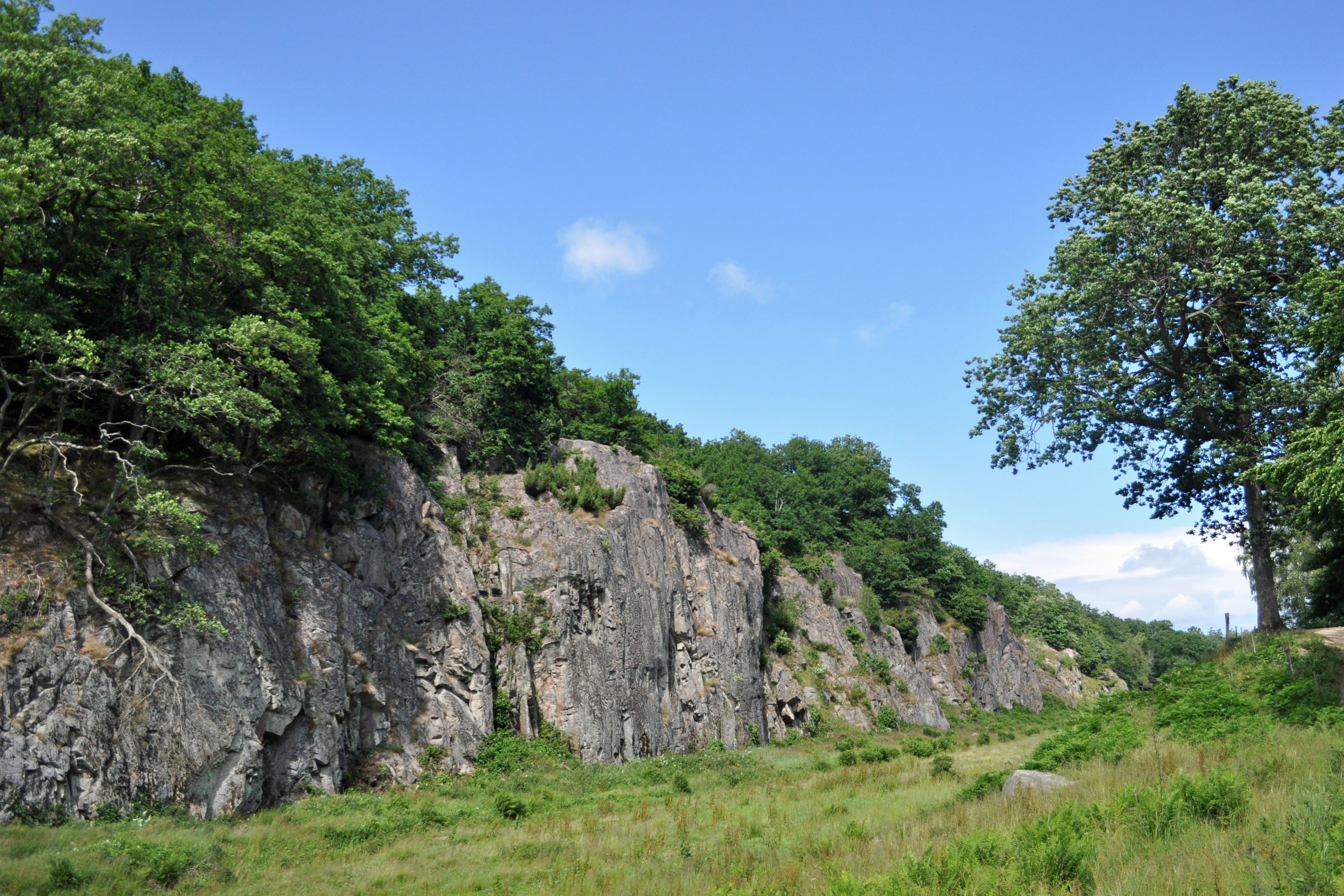
- Ekkodalen in Almindingen

Map
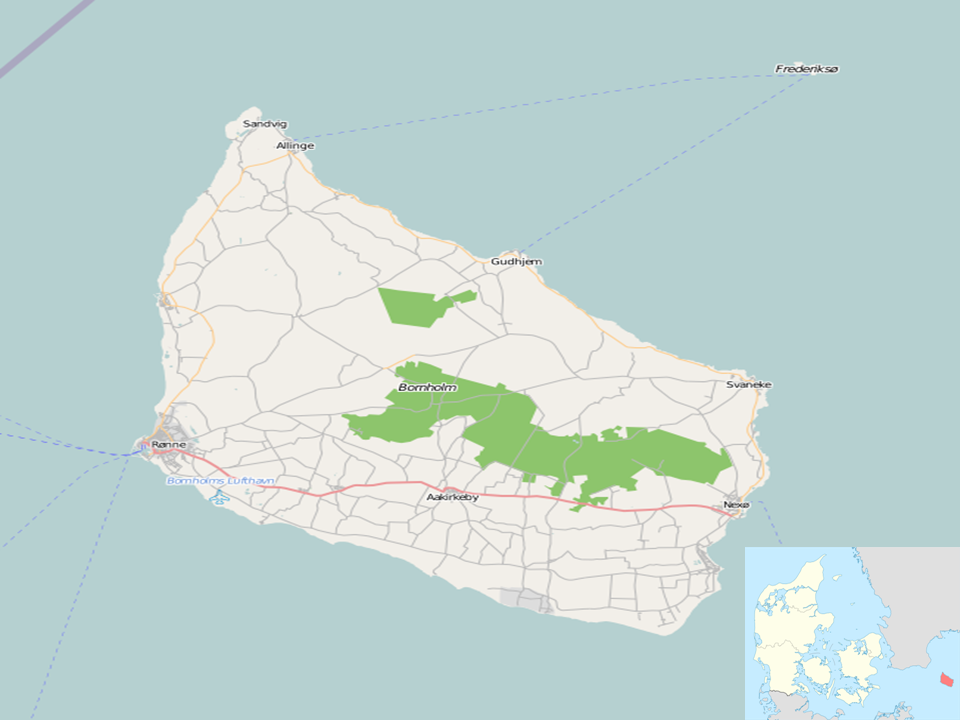
- Map of Bornholm; Almindingen, the largest forest area spreading from the centre to the east

Geography
- Location: Island of Bornholm, Denmark
- Area: 38 km^{2} (15 sq mi)

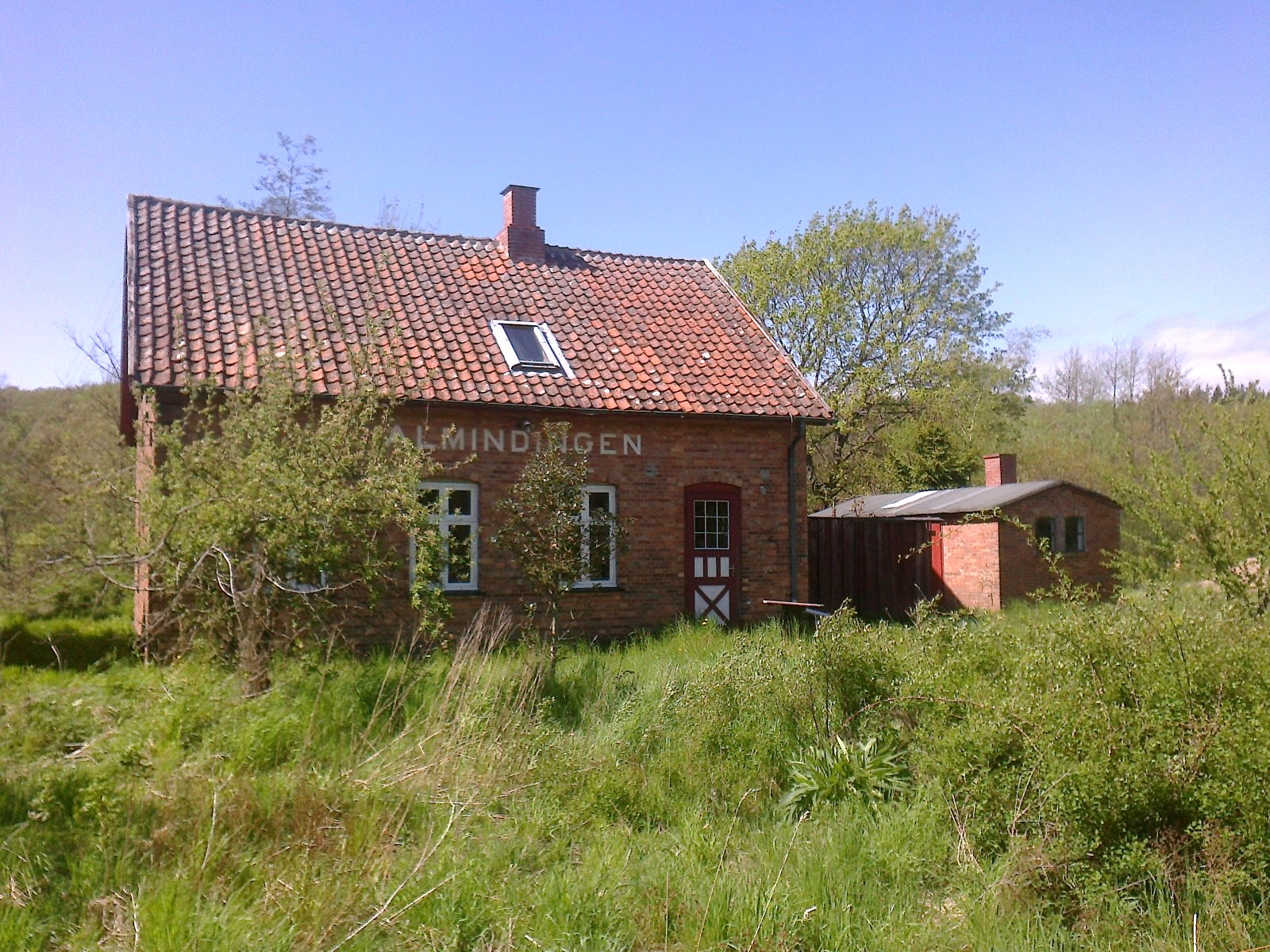
Almindingen Station

Almindingen ("the common") is one of the largest forests in Denmark. It is located in the centre of the island of Bornholm. The forest covers 3,800 hectares (9,400 acres), making it Denmark's third largest. Though it was at one time common grazing land for cattle, it was fenced in for forestry in 1809 by Hans Rømer, the forest supervisor. As a result, by the beginning of the 20th century, Bornholm had become Denmark's most forested region.

Bornholm's highest point is Rytterknægten at 162 metres (531 ft), where there is a memorial to Frederick VII of Denmark and Countess Danner's visit to the island in 1851. In 2012, the Nature Agency brought seven European bison from a Polish primeval forest to a 200 acres (81 ha) paddock in Almindingen, marking the first time in 2,500 years that Europe's heaviest land-living mammals were in Denmark. There are a number of walking paths through Almindingen such as the ones leading to Ekkodal and Gamleborg.

== Geography ==
Almindingen's habitat has been described as a "green oasis" or a "Disneyland for nature lovers". The geographical features include many small valleys and a large rift valley Ekkodalen ("echo valley"), with steep rocky cliffs, two large marshy areas, several bogs and fens, with stretches of open heath to the east. There are patches of the original mixed woods and oak woods. The many watch towers facilitate bird watching at close quarters. There are observation towers at Udkæret, Bastemose, Svinemose, Ølene, and Rømersvej. Many public roads, forest tracks, and paths are available, as well as some rudimentary camp sites.

== Conservation ==
Though the forest is subject to commercial use, it has some areas which remain 'untouched' as woodland and grazing pastures. Older methods of management are sometimes employed where they can enhance the habitat for flora and fauna. In this conservation effort, the EU Birds Directive and the EU Habitat Directive have brought Almindingen under protection guidelines. Ølene has been declared a nature reserve and totally prohibited for visitors. Conservation orders are also in force for Ekkodalen, and the two bogs of Vallensgård and Kærgård. The Important Bird Area organization, BirdLife International, has listed both Almindingen and Rø Plantage. Conservation effort also covers recreational use, preservation of cultural relics and natural scenic locations.

== Fauna and flora ==
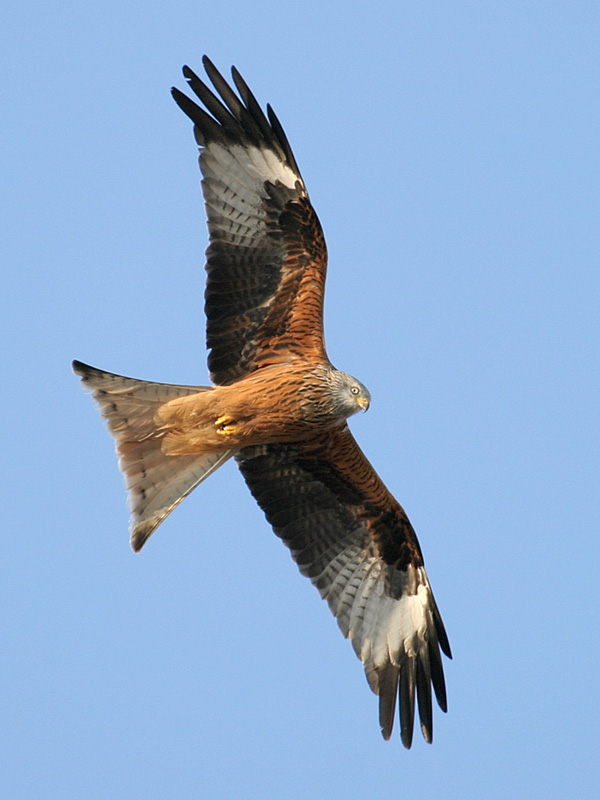
Red kite

The fauna reported by the European Environment Agency in the area in Almindingen, Paradisbakkerne and Ølene are:

- Invertebrates – Dytiscus latissimus and Graphoderus bilineatus
- Birds – Tengmalm's owl (Aegolius funereus), Eurasian bittern (Botaurus stellaris), European nightjar (Caprimulgus europaeus), western marsh harrier (Circus aeruginosus), hen harrier (Circus cyaneus), corn crake (Crex crex), black woodpecker (Dryocopus martius), common crane (Grus grus), white-tailed eagle (Haliaeetus albicilla), lesser grey shrike (Lanius minor), red kite (Milvus milvus), osprey (Pandion haliaetus), and European honey buzzard (Pernis apivorus). In all 210 bird species have been reported from the area.
- Mammals – Bechstein's bat (Myotis bechsteinii) and pond bat (Myotis dasycneme).

== Places of interest ==
Bornholm has both varied natural features, such as Almindingen, Hammeren, Jons Kapel, Paradisbakkerne, and Dueodde, as well as Denmark's tallest lighthouse. Places of interest in Almindingen include the ruins of Lilleborg Castle, the Kristianshøj Inn, well built forest ranger residences, the arboretum, Bolsterbjerg, Gamleborg, and to the east, the hills of Paradisbakkerne. Towers for bird-watching are erected to view birds of prey, ducks, geese and sometimes large cranes. The Nexø-Dueodde tourist information office provides information to tourists.

There are four designated walks:

- Walk 1 is 4 kilometres (2.5 mi) long.
- Walk 2 is 4 kilometres (2.5 mi) long. Along the Ekkodalen echo valley, the echo can be best heard by walking along the marked path to the left and facing H.C. Ørsted's spring. At Rytterknægten, the monument erected in 1856 is seen. The viewing tower here made in 1899 from where panoramic views of the forests can be enjoyed is 184 metres (604 ft) tall.
- Walk 3 is 4 kilometres (2.5 mi) long. There is a diversity of trees, shrubs, grasslands and some small lakes. The Arboretet, landscaped in 1932 by the forest ranger A.F. Valdemar Seier (from 1916 to 1946), covers an area of 4-5 ha.
- Walk 4 is 5 kilometres (3.1 mi) long. There are several lakes such as the Græssøen, Dyresøen, Borgesøen, and Gamleborg Lake. Other notable landmarks are a Viking era castle ruin and Lilleborg Castle.

== See also ==
- List of protected areas of Bornholm
