= Paradisbakkerne =

Group of Danish hills

Coordinates: 55°06′00″N 15°05′00″E

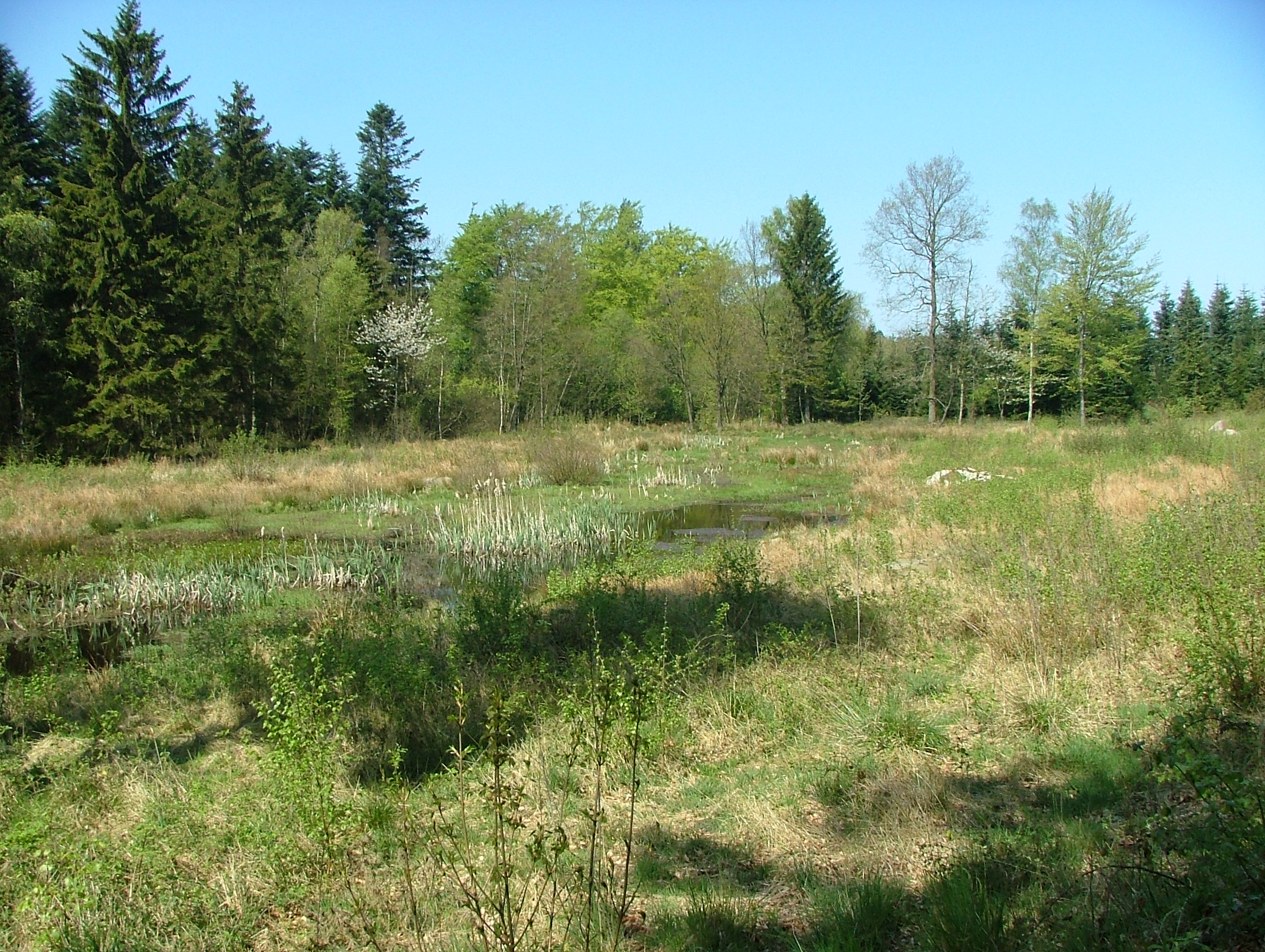
Oksemyr in the Paradisbakkerne

Paradisbakkerne ("hills of paradise"), also Helvedesbakkerne ("hills of hell"), is a group of hills in Denmark, located in the east of the island of Bornholm. It is situated approximately 3 kilometres (1.9 mi) northwest of Nexø. The privately owned area consists of hilly, rocky landscapes with narrow rift valleys lined by almost vertical cliffs, making it popular for nature walks. Typically, the hills rise to a height of 30–50 metres (98–164 ft) above the surroundings in a forested area which also has a number of small lakes and marshes. Midterpilt, 113 metres (371 ft) above sea level, is one of the highest points. Although much of the area is now wooded, it was once covered with heather and low shrubs, making it suitable for grazing. Paradisbakkerne has a long cultural history, attested by numerous place names with their own legends and stories. These include Slingestenen, Linkisten, Ligstenen, Dybedal, Ravnedal, Majdal, and Gamle Dam.

== Geography ==
Bornholm has varied natural features, such as Almindingen, Hammeren, Jons Kapel, Rytterknægten, and Dueodde. Paradisbakkerne rises within the eastern part of Bornholm's forest. It stretches across approximately 6,200 hectares (15,000 acres) in the eastern-central area of the island. The forest area of Paradisbakkerne is ecologically diverse, and contains a rich flora and fauna, including a number of rare amphibians and reptiles. There are many valleys from the north through the south, which give the whole area a hilly character. In addition to rift valleys, there is also evidence of the last ice age with glacial boulders and glacial striae. Rock piles, which previously served as landmarks and were visible from afar are now surrounded by forest. The geological formation in the area is granite. The landscape was once covered with heather, shrubs and other low vegetation before the twentieth century, but it has been forested and conserved since the 1930s.

== Fauna, flora, and funga ==
The fauna reported by the European Environment Agency in the area, as well as in Almindingen and Ølene, include the invertebrates Dytiscus latissimus (a species of beetle), and Graphoderus bilineatus (a species of beetle in family Dytiscidae). The bird species recorded are Tengmalm's owl (Aegolius funereus), Eurasian bittern (Botaurus stellaris), European nightjar (Caprimulgus europaeus), western marsh harrier (Circus aeruginosus), hen harrier (Circus cyaneus), corn crake (Crex crex), black woodpecker (Dryocopus martius), common crane (Grus grus), white-tailed eagle (Haliaeetus albicilla), lesser grey shrike (Lanius minor), red kite (Milvus milvus), osprey (Pandion haliaetus), and European honey buzzard (Pernis apivorus). The mammal species reported are Bechstein's bat (Myotis bechsteinii) and pond bat (Myotis dasycneme).

Fungi reported from the area include Amanita muscaria and Sparassis crispa.

== Conservation ==
Since the beginning of the eighteenth century, much of the island has been afforested. Sheep grazing is permitted by the Regional Municipality of Bornholm in identified areas. Paradisbakkerne contains an extensive network of hiking trails. Tourists are permitted to walk on the roads and trails from sunrise to sunset in accordance with the Nature Protection Act. There is also a restriction on construction of any residential buildings and farmhouses within 150 metres (490 ft) of the area of the hilly landscape. Berries, mushrooms, moss and flowers that grow along the walkways or trials of the conservation area only can be picked for use. Intersecting Paradisbakkerne in an east–west direction is a cycle path that crosses the entire island. There is also a bridle path that winds all the way around the circumference.
