= Ekkodalen =

Valley in Denmark

Coordinates: 55°06′34″N 14°54′07″E

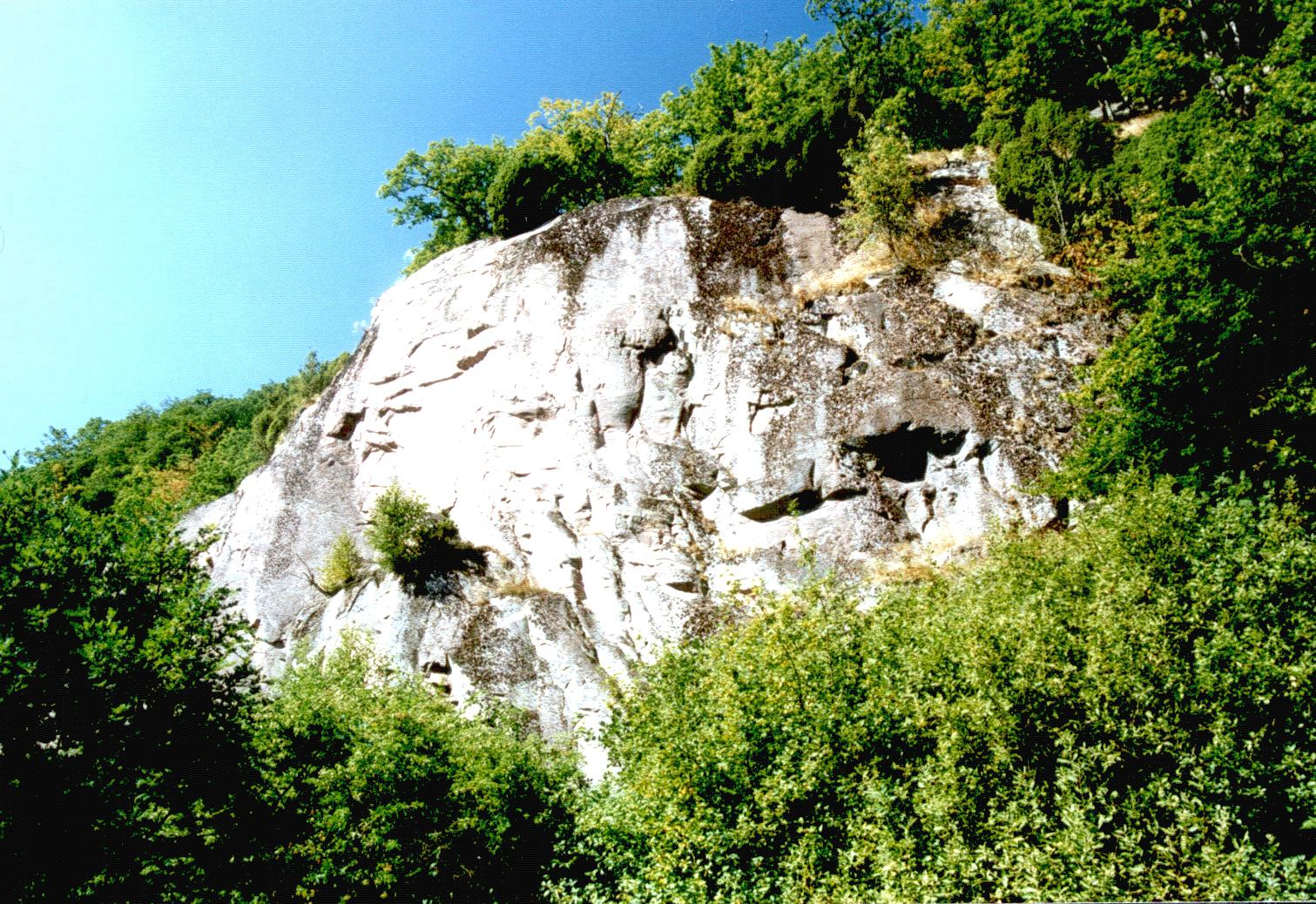
Ekkodalen

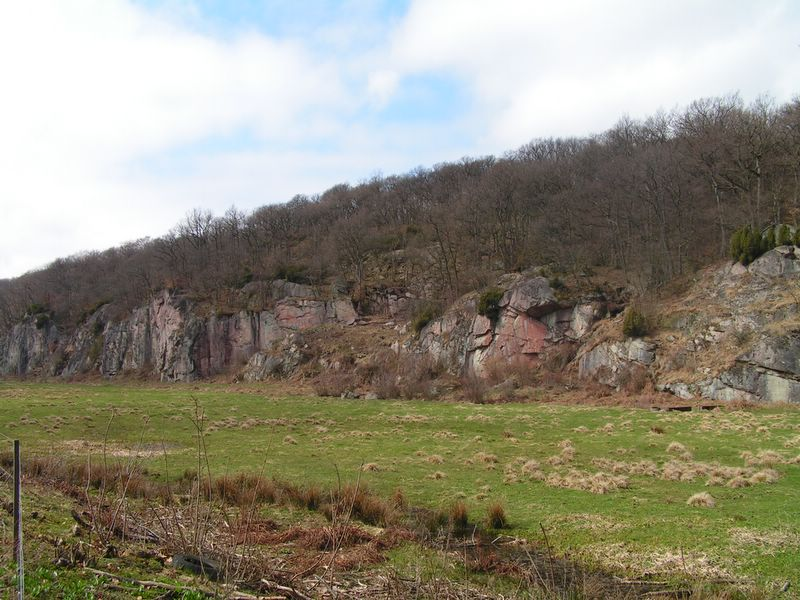
Ekkodalen seen from the path to Gamleborg.

Ekkodalen (Echo Valley) on Bornholm is Denmark's longest rift. It stretches 12 km from Vallensgård Mose through Almindingen, Flæskedal, Kløvedal and Kelseådal to Saltuna on Bornholm's northeast coast.

== History ==
Echo Valley was originally named Kodalen (Cow Valley), probably because by the royal edict of 1658 the peasants had obtained rights to free grazing for their cattle there. The first time the name Ekkodalen appears on a map was in 1746 when someone added EC before Kodalen changing it to Eckodalen. Others argue that it was Bornholm's first forester, Hans Rømer, who found the name.

The steep cliffs on one side of Ekkodalen are called Styrtebakkerne. The name was originally Stortebakkene, an old Bornholm term for a ridge with a steep, vertical rock face.

In Ekkodalen there are memorials to Bornholm philanthropist Marie Kofoed and to Hans Rømer, the forester. There is also one on the cliff face where a young scout, Johannes V. Andersen, died after a fall in 1947.

In 1809, to the dismay of the local peasants who lost their free grazing rights, Hans Rømer built an impressive stone wall around the forest which still stands today. He served as forester in the period 1800-36, creating Almindingen, Denmark's third largest forest. He established and named Hans Christian Ørsted's spring and he built Ekkodalen's half-timbered property, Rømersdal, which is still the residence of the State Forester.

== The echo ==
The best echo is obtained beside Hans Christian Ørsted's spring, about 20 meters to the left along the path at the entrance to Ekkodalen opposite Ekkodalshuset. The spring was an ancient holy well. It was thought its clean water was curative and tasty. In the 1920s and 1930s it was also called also Ørsted's Radium Source.

The source is named after the scientist and natural philosopher Hans Christian Ørsted. In 1819, he was among the first to survey and map the geology of Bornholm. Together with researchers L. Esmarch and I.G. Forchhammer, he visited Bornholm to investigate the occurrence of coal beds and iron ore. During his stay, he became a friend of Hans Rømer.

Vilhelm Bergsøe wrote in 1893: "Almindingen's most famous area is Kodalen, or, as the fine variant has it: Ekkodalen. It is equally entitled to both names as the fresh turf in the broad meadows lining the valley is just as enticing for the cows as its remarkable echo is alluring for the joyful visitors to the forest. From time to time, a gun shot rolls through the valley. You stop and listen; a new shot - and then you realize it is the hatch to "Ørsted's Well" that energetic youths are using as a cannon, whose sound waves bounce back from the steep rocky walls with a tenfold echo."
