= Dueodde =

Beach in Denmark

- Beach
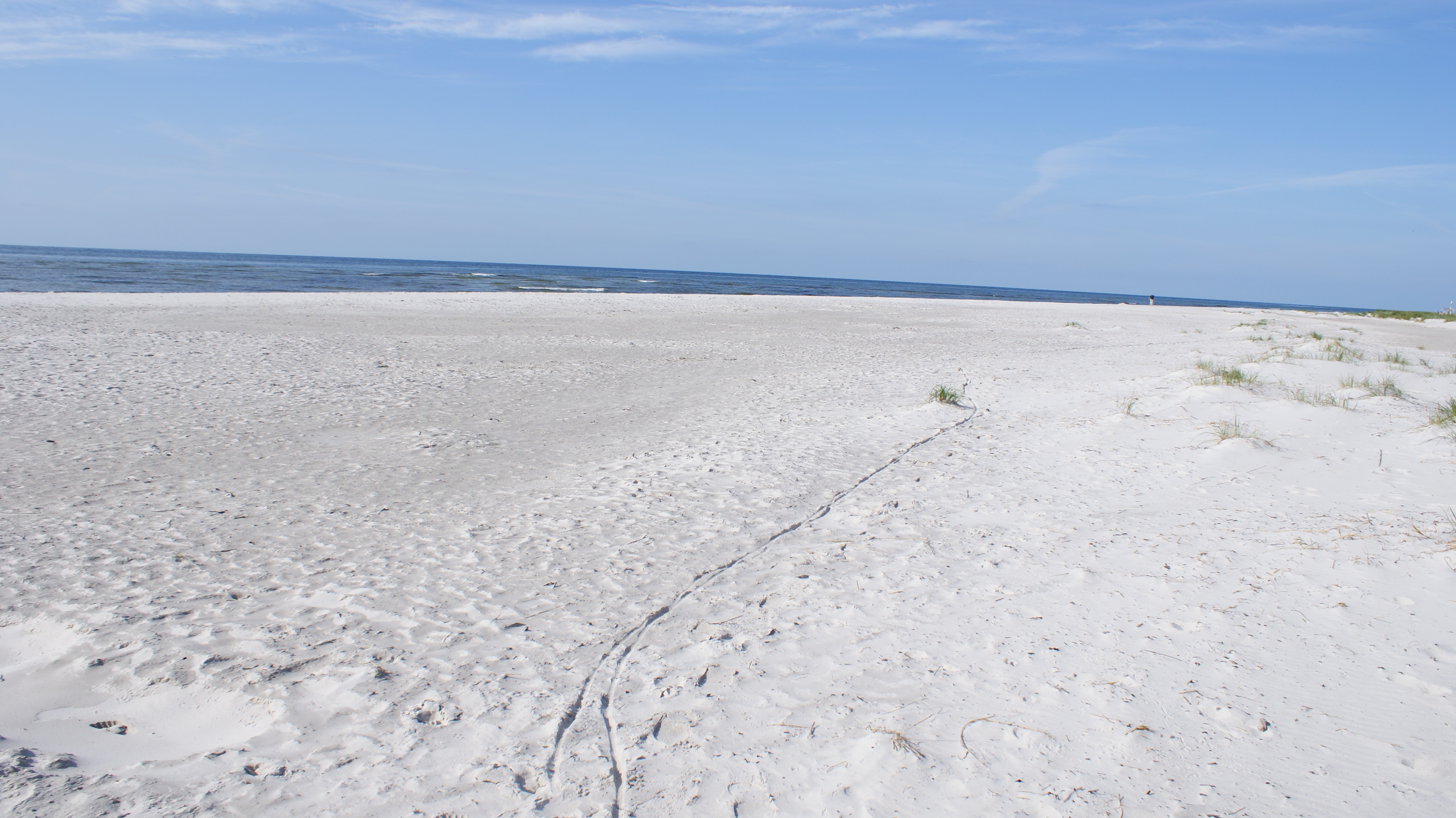
- Dueodde beach

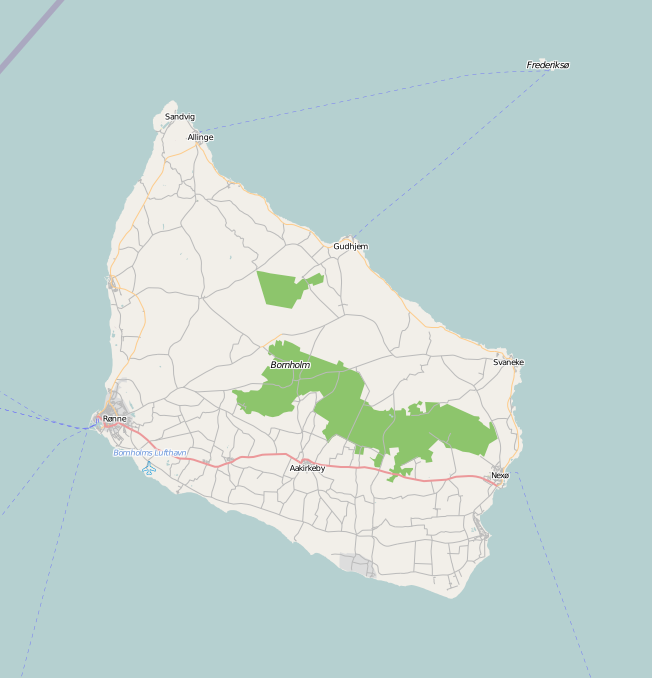
- Location within Bornholm
- Coordinates: 54°59′30.16″N 15°4′27.26″E

Dueodde is a beach in Denmark on Bornholm's southernmost tip. It is known for its very fine white sand. The area around Dueodde was originally a large sandy area. In the eighteenth century it was planted with pines, as well as Ammophila and Leymus grasses to reduce sand drift. Today, Dueodde is a protected area. The sand at Dueodde moves easily with the wind to form dunes. The vast dune area and associated sandy beach start at Haslemere extending some 30 kilometres (19 mi) almost without interruption. Apart from the beach, one noteworthy feature is the Dueodde Lighthouse on the southern tip. It is the tallest on the island. Built in 1962, it offers a panoramic view of the surroundings. The two old lighthouses, Dueodde Syd (next to the new lighthouse) and Dueodde Nord are not open for the public.

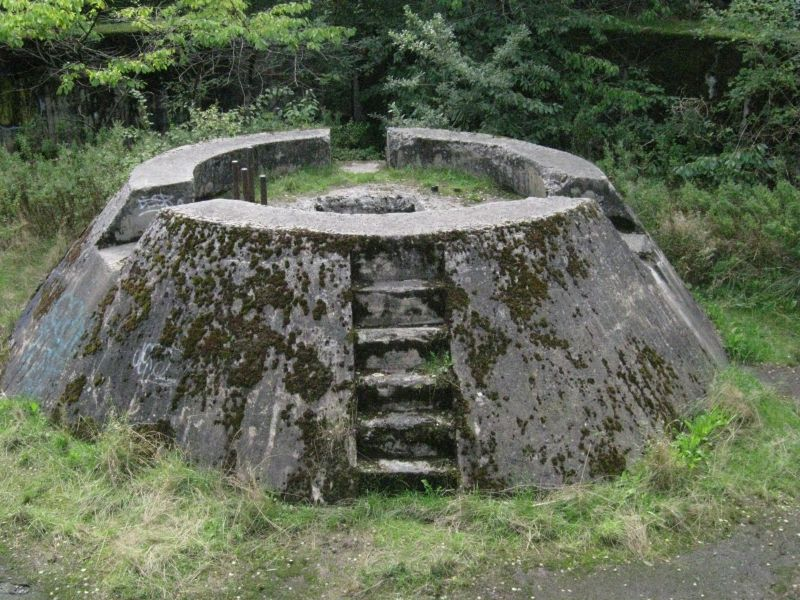
Remains of unfinished gun battery

Hidden in the forest one can find the ruins of the two gun batteries Bornholm Süd, which were constructed by the German Wehrmacht from 1940, but closed down unfinished in 1941, when the soldiers were transferred to Kristiansand (Norway) to build the battery Vara.

== Geography ==
Bornholm has varied natural features, such as Almindingen, Hammeren, Jons Kapel, Paradisbakkerne, and Helligdomsklipperne. Dueodde is the largest beach on Bornholm and is reachable by a short walk from the bus stand. Buildings in the area include Dueodde Vandrerhjem & Campground, Restaurant Granpavillonen and Dueodde Badehotel. It is located south of Nexø, extending several kilometres from Snogebæk on the eastern coast to the south and west. Most of the landscape is a wilderness of pine and spruce trees, salt-tolerant shrubs, and sand dunes. The sea water is generally calm and is shallow for about 100 metres (330 ft), after which the depth increases. The beach has some of the finest sand deposits. The sand dunes formed by the blowing wind rise to heights of 12 metres (39 ft) above the nearby sea. Because of its fine quality, sand is sent to the Sahara beach in the southwest of Bornholm. The fine white sand grains have been used for filling hour glasses. Tourists crowd the beach in July and August. There are several hundred meters of boardwalks along the beach which are crowded during the summer season.

== See also ==
- List of beaches in Denmark
