= Gamleborg =

First fortification on the Danish island of Bornholm

Coordinates: 55°6′51″N 14°54′24″E

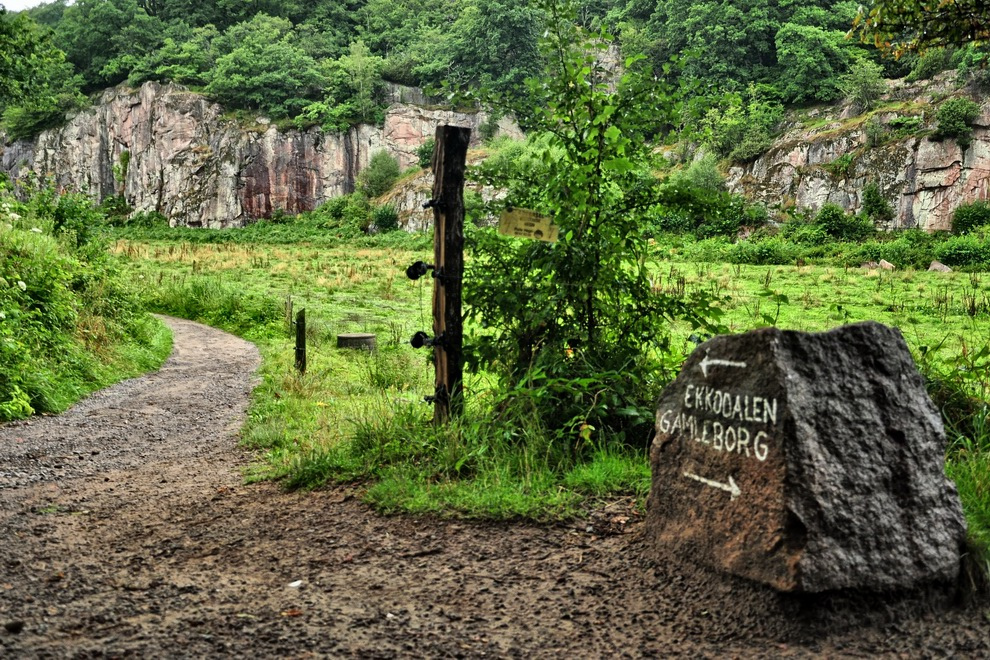
Gamleborg Almindingen trail

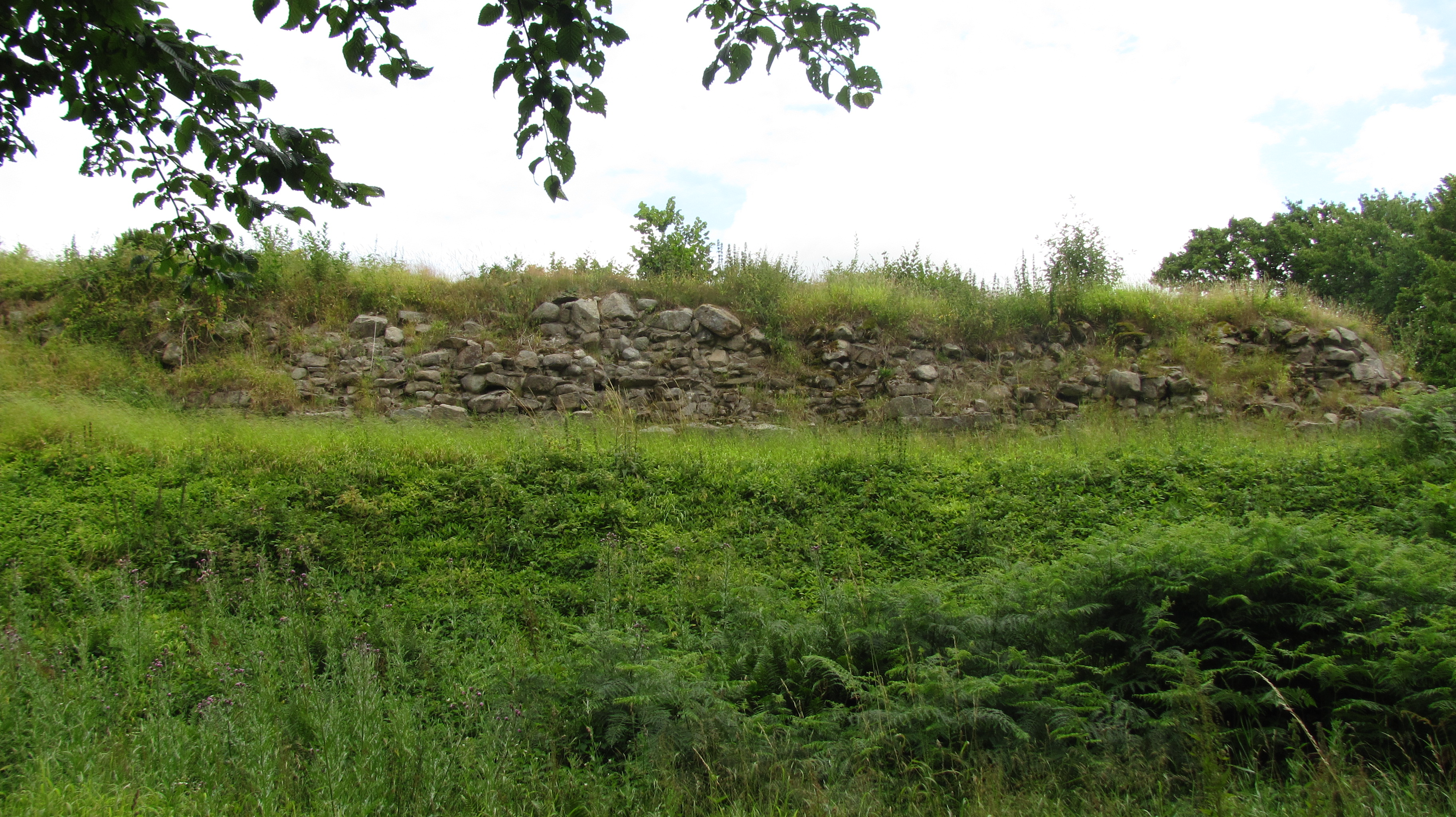
Gamleborg stonewall

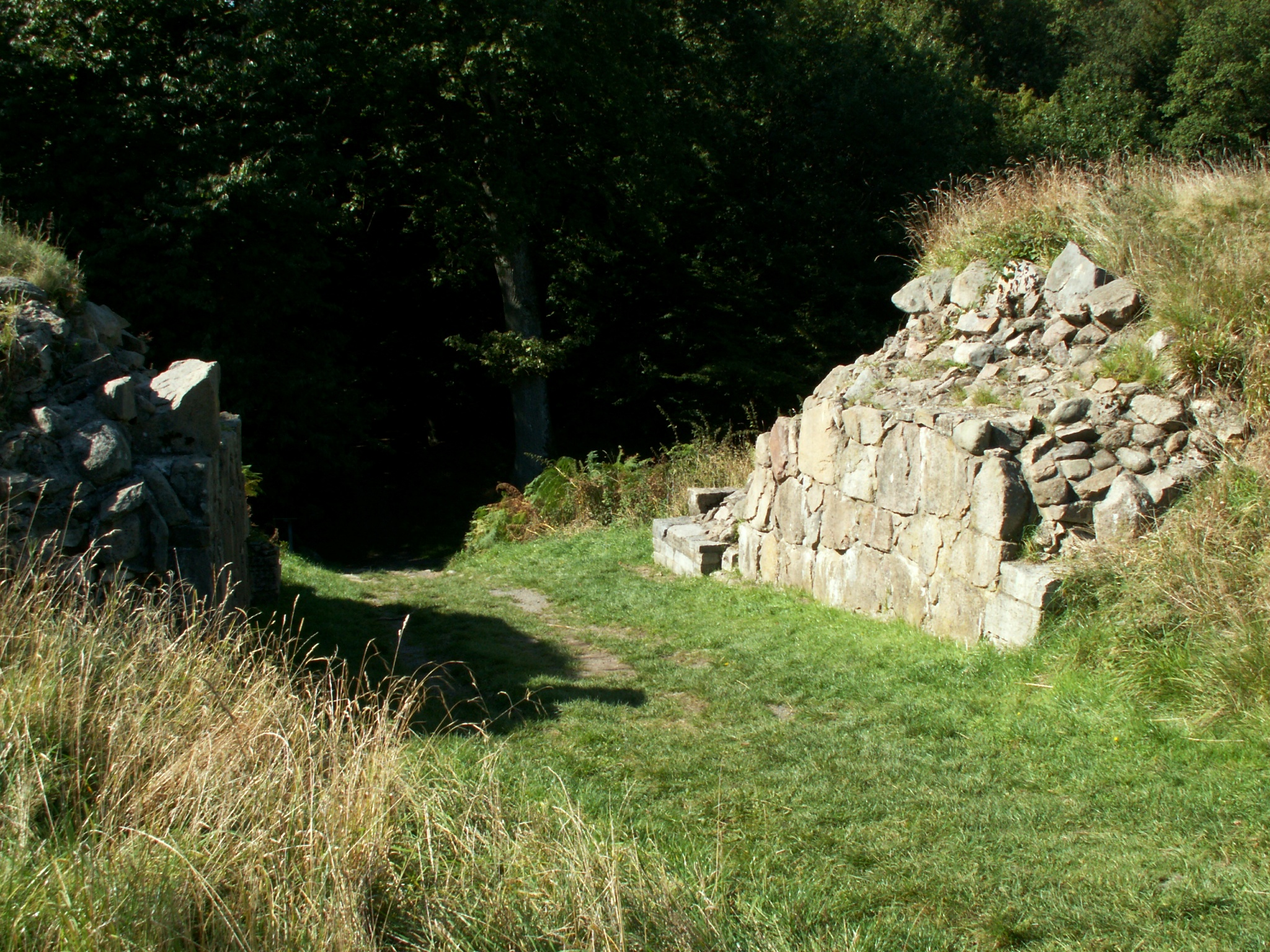
Gamleborg entrance

Gamleborg, also known as Gamleborg Viking Fortress, was the first fortification on the Danish island of Bornholm. Built around 750 AD, it was the seat of the kings of Bornholm during the Viking age (750–1050) and early Middle Ages (1050–1150). The massive fortress is 264 metres (866 ft) long from north to south and 110 metres (360 ft) wide from east to west, with gates to the north and southwest. Around 1100, significant alterations were made and it was reinforced, but it was abandoned soon afterwards in favour of the fortification of Lilleborg, roughly 700 metres (2,300 ft) to the northeast.

== History ==
The fortress is Bornholm's oldest defence works. Its builder is unknown, but an account of the Baltic Sea travels of Wulfstan of Hedeby in 890 tells us that Bornholm already had its own king at the time. There is, however, firm evidence that the fortress was in use during the reigns of Harald Bluetooth (940–986) and Canute IV (1080–1086). Gamleborg was used as refuge during the tenth century against Viking raids. Gamleborg was abandoned in 1150, the occupants moving to Lilleborg, only 700 metres (2,300 ft) to the northwest. It is not known why the move was made but it does not appear to have been the result of hostilities. Excavations in the 1950s showed the fortifications originated in the Viking period although there is evidence the site was used as a hideout in the Iron Age. The ruins that can be seen today are mainly the result of reconstruction work completed in about 1100.

== Architecture ==
The fortress is 27,000 square metres (290,000 sq ft) in size. Part of the wall, built of rocks and boulders set in clay, is still in good condition, and the outline of the fort is still remarkably clear given its age. The fortress at one time had a moat and outer wall, and the walls on the north and south side were higher, around 6 metres (20 ft) in height.

== Grounds ==
The fort is located on a hill almost in the centre of the island, part of the Almindingen forest. It is several hundred yards off the main road from Rønne to Svaneke. The site is naturally protected by cliffs, especially on the south side, which are up to 20 metres (66 ft) in height. A water pool, located on the northwestern side was the main water supply to the fortress. The ruins are situated in mounds.

The defences first consisted of huge ramparts built of large boulders, consolidated with earth and clay. There were initially gates to the north and south with additional protection from moats and outer ramparts. There were several buildings for the occupants and their stores. Two stone lined embankments can still be seen aside the west entrance. Outside the old western rampart, the site was fortified with a solid stone wall, 275 metres (902 ft) long, 2 metres (6 ft 7 in) wide and up to 6 metres (20 ft) high. The north gate was significantly widened and there was probably a watchtower on the northwest corner of the rampart. The old south gate was walled up and replaced by a larger entrance on the southwest corner.
