= Nyker (disambiguation) =

Nyker is a town in Denmark.

Nyker may also refer to:

- Jasandra Nyker, chief executive officer of BioTherm Energy
- Nyker Group, a group of geological formations from the Early Cretaceous
- Ny Kirke, a church in Nyker
