= Young Global Leaders =

Non-profit organization

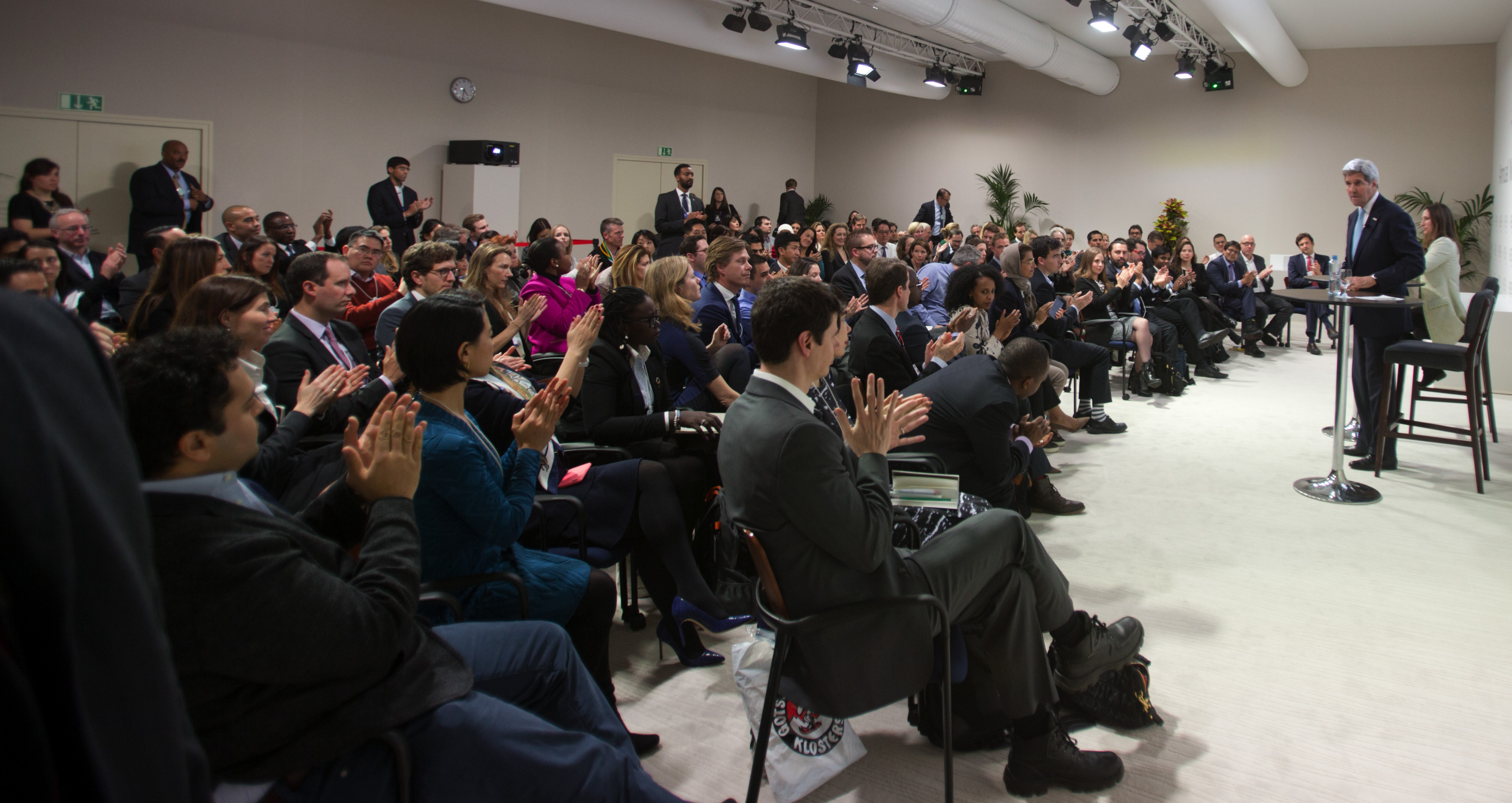
- United States Secretary of State John Kerry speaking to the Forum of Young Global Leaders, 2016
- Founder: Klaus Schwab
- Headquarters: Geneva, Switzerland

Forum of Young Global Leaders, or Young Global Leaders (YGL), is a non-profit globalist organization. The organization was created by Klaus Schwab, founder of the World Economic Forum and is managed from Geneva, Switzerland, under the supervision of the Swiss government. It is run by the World Economic Forum.

== History ==
The program was founded by Klaus Schwab of the World Economic Forum in 1992 under the name Global Leaders for Tomorrow and was renamed to Young Global Leaders in 2003. Schwab created the group with $1 million won from the Dan David Prize, and the inaugural 2005 class comprised 237 young leaders. Since then, a total of some 1400 individuals have been inducted into the YGL community.

== Reception ==
BusinessWeek's Bruce Nussbaum describes the Young Global Leaders as "the most exclusive private social network in the world" and "perhaps the paramount networking network in the globe", while the organization bills the group of selected leaders as representing "the voice for the future and the hopes of the next generation". It has elsewhere also been described as a grouping that is "leading the charge in nurturing a special community of leaders committed to addressing the world's most urgent challenges."

Skeptics suggest that the grouping is "instrumental in shaping policy around the world, undermining democratic principles, and creating obedient and compliant servants" In dispelling such conspiracy theories of the influence of the organisation, Michelle Rempel, a Canadian Conservative politician who found out she had been selected as a Young Global Leader in 2016 with an email that she initially had assumed was spam, noted that the 2017 meeting was "no different in feel from an academic conference, if a bit more global in nature and with more high-profile politicians and CEOs in attendance." One academic, having studied the grouping, pointed out that while such social networks provides "privileged access to a network of elites" and represents "a concentration of cultural and social as well as symbolic capital", it would be simplistic to conclude that membership would "deterministically imply that the actors will obey its values." Another has suggested that the platform effectively selects already prominent and influential individuals, noting that "Young Global Leaders are not "put in power" like many believe. You cannot become a YGL unless you are already in a powerful position."

== Selection process ==
Representing 70 countries, Young Global Leaders are nominated by alumni to serve six-year terms and are subject to a selection process that includes the possibility of veto. Candidates must be under the age of 38 at the time of selection ( meaning active members are 44 or younger). There have been hundreds of members from fields including politics, business, academia, media, and the arts. The community includes heads of government, business executives, Nobel Prize and Grammy Award recipients, and United Nations Goodwill Ambassadors

The selection process includes a screening without the candidate's knowledge and, at least for the class of 2024, "nominated candidates may be invited to submit a brief application" and "shortlisted candidates may be asked to meet with a member of the YGL Community". Therefore, some nominee's may not be aware they were nominated unless they are selected, and only when they are selected. Roughly 100 YGL are selected every year. The selection criteria are strict, requiring that individuals at start-ups be founders, chief executive officers or chairs of boards (especially of series C start-ups and unicorns), individuals in the public sector be ministers, parliament members, mayors of capital cities or highly populated cities, governors, or heads of political parties and for civil society leaders to be founders and chief executive officers of consequential civil society organizations or social enterprises, or hold a senior leadership role in a large global NGO. These individuals cannot apply to join but instead are identified and proposed through a qualified nomination process, which is then vetted by Heidrick and Struggles, and subsequently vetted by a selection committee chaired by Queen Rania Al Abdullah of Jordan.

== Notable Young Global Leaders ==
Young Global Leaders straddle various fields, and are often leaders in their respective fields, including leading politicians, royalty, very senior members of Government, social activists and those in the business and finance world. As of 2022, the eight most prominent countries for Young Global Leaders are China, Germany, India, Japan, Singapore, Switzerland, the United Kingdom, the USA, with these being the only countries globally who have more than 30 Young Global Leaders.

Some prominent individuals who have been elected as Young Global Leaders include the following:

=== Angola ===
- Vera Daves - Minister of Finance

=== Argentina ===
- Martín Guzmán - Former Minister of Economy
- Esteban Bullrich - Former Minister of Education

=== Australia ===
- Kate Ellis - Politician and former Minister for Employment Participation and Childcare
- Clare O'Neil - Minister for Home Affairs and Minister for Cyber Security
- Sarah Hanson-Young - Politician
- Kaila Murnain - Former politician
- Yalda Hakim - Media personality
- Melanie Perkins - CEO of Canva
- Jessica Mauboy - Singer and songwriter

=== Austria ===
- Sebastian Kurz - Chancellor

=== Belgium ===
- Queen Mathilde - Queen
- Alexander De Croo - Prime Minister

=== Brazil ===
- Anielle Franco – Minister of Racial Equality of Brazil (Class of 2024).
- Ilona Szabó de Carvalho – Co-founder and President of the Igarapé Institute (Class of 2015).
- Joice Toyota Mendes – Co-founder and Executive Director of Motriz; founder of Vetor Brasil (Class of 2019).

=== Bulgaria ===
- Nikolina Angelkova - Former Minister of Tourism

=== Canada ===
- Justin Trudeau - Former Prime Minister
- Karina Gould - Former Leader of the Government
- Jagmeet Singh - Politician and former leader of the New Democratic Party
- Michelle Zatlyn - Co-founder of Cloudflare
- Dominique Anglade - Former leader of the Quebec Liberal Party
- Mélanie Joly - Minister of Industry
- Michelle Rempel - Politician and former Shadow Minister for Natural Resources
- Nick Frosst - Co-founder of Cohere Inc.

=== Chile ===
- Izkia Siches - Former Minister of the Interior and Public Security

=== China ===
- Li Yinuo - Entrepreneur and educator
- Jack Ma - Co-founder of the AliBaba group
- Tan Yuanyuan - Accomplished ballet dancer
- Carol Yu - Media personality

=== Costa Rica ===
- Carlos Alvarado Quesada - Former President

=== Croatia ===
- Marin Soljačić - Professor at MIT

=== Denmark ===
- Frederik X - King of Denmark
- Queen Mary - Queen of Denmark
- Lea Wermelin - Former Minister for the Environment

=== Estonia ===
- Kristo Käärmann - CEO of Wise

=== Ethiopia ===
- Sara Menker - Businesswoman and entrepreneur
- Yetnebersh Nigussie - Lawyer and human rights activist

=== Finland ===
- Sanna Marin - Former Prime Minister
- Alexander Stubb - President

=== France ===
- Emmanuel Macron - President
- Nicolas Sarkozy - Former President
- Gabriel Attal - Former Prime Minister
- Stéphane Bancel - CEO of Moderna
- Marlène Schiappa - Politician and former Secretary of State for Citizenship
- Mathieu Flamini - Former footballer and entrepreneur

=== Germany ===
- Annalena Baerbock - Federal Minister for Foreign Affairs
- Angela Merkel - Former Chancellor
- Nico Rosberg - Former Formula 1 Champion
- Michael Schumacher - Former Formula 1 Champion
- Philipp Rösler - Former Vice-chancellor and Federal Minister of Health and Economics
- Jens Spahn - Former Federal Minister of Health
- Cem Özdemir - Former Federal Minister of Food and Agriculture

=== Greece ===
- Niki Kerameus - Former Minister of Interior
- Eleni Antoniadou - Greek public figure

=== Japan ===
- Naomi Koshi - Politician; former mayor of Otsu
- Emi Kusano - Artist

=== Georgia ===
- Mamuka Bakhtadze - Former Prime Minister
- Mikheil Saakashvili - Former President

=== Haiti ===
- Wyclef Jean - Rapper and musician

=== India ===
- Sheetal Amte - Social entrepreneur and public health expert
- Edmond Fernandes - Social Entrepreneur
- Jay Shah - Cricket Administrator & politician
- Navin Jindal - Entrepreneur
- Armstrong Pame - Indian Administrative Services
- Manasi Subramaniam
- Ram Mohan Naidu - Politician

=== Indonesia ===
- William Tanuwijaya - Entrepreneur
- John Riady - Entrepreneur
- Grace Natalie - Former chairperson of the Indonesian Solidarity Party
- Anies Baswedan - Presidential candidate for 2024 election

=== Ireland ===
- Leo Varadkar - Politician
- Simon Harris - President

=== Italy ===
- Matteo Renzi - Former Prime Minister
- Sandro Salsano - Founder Salsano Group

=== Lebanon ===
- Jawad Fares - Neurosurgeon-scientist

=== Libya ===
- Saif al-Islam Gaddafi - son of former Libyan leader Muammar Gaddafi

=== Malaysia ===
- Tunku Ali Redhauddin ibni Tuanku Muhriz - Tunku Besar (Senior Prince) of Seri Menanti
- Khairy Jamaluddin - Politician and former Minister for Health
- Hannah Yeoh - Politician and former Minister of Youth and Sports
- Syed Saddiq - Politician and former Youth and Sports Minister
- Nurul Izzah Anwar - Politician and daughter of Prime Minister Anwar Ibrahim
- Shahril Sufian Hamdan - Politician and media commentator

=== Mexico ===
- Enrique Peña Nieto - Former President

=== Montenegro ===
- Igor Lukšić - Former Prime Minister

=== Myanmar ===
- Zin Mar Aung - Minister of Foreign Affairs

=== Netherlands ===
- Mark Rutte - Former Prime Minister
- Daan Roosegaarde - Famous Dutch artist
- Willem-Alexander of the Netherlands - King

=== New Zealand ===
- Jacinda Ardern - Former Prime Minister

=== Norway ===
- Haakon VIII, King of Norway - King
- Mette-Marit, Queen of Norway - Queen
- Hadia Tajik - Politician and former Minister of Labour and Social Inclusion and Minister of Culture

=== Portugal ===
- Rodrigo Tavares - Financial professional, scholar, and public administrator (class 2017)

=== Poland ===
- Jaroslaw Królewski - CEO and founder of Synerise and CEO and owner of Wisła Kraków Football Club. Advisor to president of Poland and Prime Minister of Poland

=== Saudi Arabia ===
- His Excellency Faisal F. Alibrahim - Minister of Economy and Planning of Saudi Arabia
- Prince Bandar bin Khalid Al-Faisal - Inducted during his early tenure leading Investment Enterprises.
- Prince Mohammed K.A. Al Faisal - Selected during his role as President of the Al-Faisaliah Group Holding
- HRH Reema Bint Bander - Saudi Ambassador to the United States of America
- Ahd Kamel - Filmmaker and Actress, known for pioneering work in independent cinema
- Ahmed Al Shugairi - Khawater TV / ARAM Publishing Educational Media & Social Development
- Muna AbuSulayman - Award-winning strategic leader, media icon, co-founder of multiple social ventures, Philanthropy and Development Leader, CEO of Azm Global Leader Fellowship
- Sarah Al Suhaimi - Chairperson of the Saudi stock exchange (Tadawul) and former CEO of NCB Capital.

=== Serbia ===
- Vuk Jeremic - Former president of the United Nations General Assembly

=== Spain ===
- Francisco de Borbón von Hardenberg - businessman
- Albert Rivera Diaz - Politician

=== Singapore ===
- Aaron Maniam - Academic
- Mohamed Faizal - Supreme Court Judicial Commissioner
- Eunice Olsen - Actress and former politician
- Sun Dorjee - Social entrepreneur
- Juliana Chan - Scientist and entrepreneur
- Thum Ping Tjin - Historian
- Jackie Yi-Ru Ying - Scientist
- Penny Low - Politician

=== South Africa ===
- Jasandra Nyker - Entrepreneur
- Lindiwe Mazibuko - Politician and former leader of the opposition
- Trevor Manuel - Retired politician
- Charlize Theron - Actress
- Elon Musk - CEO of Tesla

=== Sweden ===
- Jonas Birgersson - Internet Entrepreneur
- Victoria, Crown Princess of Sweden - Crown princess
- Niklas Zennström - Entrepreneur

=== Switzerland ===
- Roger Federer - Tennis player
- Nicole Schwab - businesswoman, author

=== Tunisia ===
- Amira Yahyaoui - Tunisian multiawarded activist and entrepreneur
- Lina Ben Mhenni - Tunisian activist, blogger, writer, and 2011 Nobel Peace Prize Nominee
- Wafa Makhlouf - Politician, Former Member of the Tunisian Parliament, and entrepreneur

=== Ukraine ===
- Hanna Hopko - Politician and former chair of the Committee on Foreign Affairs

=== United Kingdom ===
- David Cameron - Former Prime Minister
- Amal Clooney - Barrister and wife of George Clooney
- Ed Miliband - Politician; former leader of the Labour Party and Leader of the Opposition
- Richard Walker - Executive Chairman of Iceland
- Devi Sridhar - Academic and public health advocate
- Nathaniel Rothschild, 5th Baron Rothschild - Financier

=== United States of America ===
- Mark Zuckerberg - CEO and Founder of Facebook
- Jimmy Wales - Co-founder of Wikipedia
- Pete Buttigieg - Politician and former US Secretary of Transportation
- Leonardo DiCaprio - Actor
- Sheryl Sandberg - Former Facebook executive
- Jerry Yang - Co-Founder of Yahoo!
- Sergey Brin - Co-founder of Google
- Chad Hurley - Co-founder of YouTube
- Anderson Cooper - Journalist
- Alexander Soros - investor and philanthropist, son of George Soros
- Lera Auerbach - Accomplished classical composer, conductor and concert pianist
- Samantha Power - Former Ambassador to the United Nations
- Chris Tucker - Comedian and actor
- Ashton Kutcher - Actor
- Peter Thiel - Co-founder of numerous companies, including PayPal
- Julian Castro - Politician; Former US Secretary of Housing and Urban Development
- Sanjay Gupta - Neurosurgeon and journalist
- Leana Wen - Doctor and author
- Chelsea Clinton - American writer and daughter of former US President Bill Clinton
- Sam Altman - American entrepreneur
- Megan Rapinoe - US former footballer
- Kabir Sehgal - Artist, author, and producer
- Jack Conte - Founder of Patreon
- Salman Khan - CEO of Khan Academy
- Joe Gebbia - Co-founder of Airbnb
- Rye Barcott-co-founder and CEO of With Honor

=== Venezuela ===
- Maria Corina Machado - Venezuelan opposition leader and Nobel Peace Prize winner 2025

=== Vietnam ===
- Le Thi Thu Thuy

=== Yemen ===
- Rafat Ali Al-Akhali - Yemeni politician and economist. Former Minister of Youth and Sports
