= Bente Hammer =

Danish textile artist and fashion designer

Bente Hammer (born 1950) is a Danish textile artist and fashion designer. Born in Helsinge in the north of Zealand, she moved to the island of Bornholm in 1987 where she opened a workshop and boutique in an old smithy on Nyker Hovedgade, the main street in Nyker, about 7 km northeast of Ronne. In 2011, she opened a second store in Svaneke together with the jewellery designer Nina Schrøder.

She is said to make "one-of-a-kind clothing made of handprinted textiles". She uses a wealth of different materials in her works and has created many colorful printed fabrics. Hammer has designed dresses for clients such as Queen Margrethe and the actress Ghita Nørby. A kimono designed by Hammer was presented to Queen Margrethe on the occasion of her 70th birthday by Bornholm Regional Municipality. In an extensive interview on Denmark's TV2, she explains how she learnt the art of textile design at Mulle Høyrups Eksperimentelle Værkstedskole, a small specialized school with only six students. There she was able to appreciate the individuality of the craft at a time when most of those working in the textile business simply worked for large international producers. She completed her studies in 1973.

In October 2012, Hammer who is a member of ACAB Arts and Crafts Bornholm was together with the association's president, Maibritt Jønsson, selected to represent the island of Bornholm at a conference on creative design in eastern Iceland with a view to inspiring local craftsmen in their work.
