= Nicole Schwab =

Swiss author and businesswoman

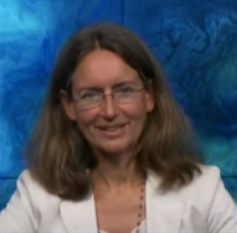
- Schwab in 2021
- Born: 1975 (age 50–51)
- Education: Harvard University; Cambridge University
- Occupations: author businesswoman
- Parent: Klaus Schwab (father)

Nicole Schwab (born 1975) is a Swiss author and businesswoman. She is the co-founder of the Gender Equality Project, and was head of the Forum of Young Global Leaders from 2004 to 2006.

== Early life ==
Schwab is the daughter of Klaus Schwab, the founder of the World Economic Forum, and Hilda Schwab. She studied at Harvard University and Cambridge University.

== Career ==
Schwab headed the Forum of Young Global Leaders from 2004 to 2006. She worked for the World Bank in Latin America and later for the Bolivian Ministry of Health. Schwab was on the board of directors for the Chanel Corporate Foundation.

In 2009, she co-founded the Gender Equality Project in Geneva, to promote diversity in business.

In October 2014, she wrote The Heart of the Labyrinth.

== Personal life ==
Apart from being a writer, Schwab does podcasts, advocates for gender equality and leads sustainability teams around the world. Schwab speaks Spanish, French and English.
