= Joice Toyota Mendes =

- Born: Joice Toyota Mendes; March 22, 1984 (age 42); São Bernardo do Campo, São Paulo, Brazil
- Education: University of São Paulo (BSc, Electrical Engineering) and Stanford University (MBA, MAEd ’15)
- Occupation: Executive Director of Motriz
- Years active: 2006–present
- Organizations: Bain & Company, Vetor Brasil (Executive Director, June 2015 – December 2023), Instituto Gesto and Motriz (Executive Director, since January 2024)
- Known for: Public administration, civil service reform and education policy
- Board member of: Apolitical Foundation (Global Advisor, since 2021), Movimento Pessoas à Frente (Governance Committee, since 2021) and ImpulsoGov (Council Member)
- Spouse: Married
- Awards: Young Global Leader by the World Economic Forum, Education Pioneers Fellow and Person of the Year Fellow by the Brazilian-American Chamber of Commerce
- Website: Motriz Official Website

Joice Toyota Mendes (born March 22, 1984) is a Brazilian entrepreneur recognized for her work in public administration and nonprofit management. She is currently the executive director of Motriz, a nonprofit organization focused on improving local government service delivery. In 2018, she was appointed by then-President Michel Temer to the Brazilian National Council for Economic and Social Development. Toyota Mendes received the Prêmio Veja-se (Veja-se Award) from Veja and is a Young Global Leader at the World Economic Forum. Under her leadership, Vetor Brasil (a non-profit organization she founded) received MacKenzie Scott's first philanthropic donation to an organization outside the United States. Toyota Mendes is a frequent source for the media on the issues she works on and her profile has been featured in publications such as Folha de São Paulo, Brazil Journal, The Conversation, among others.

== Relevance and notability ==
In 2015, Toyota Mendes founded Vetor Brasil, a civil society organization dedicated to supporting the modernization of public management in Brazilian subnational governments. The organization secured funding from multiple national and international sources, including the Lemann Foundation, Google.org, Instituto Sonho Grande, Itaú Social, Confluentes, Haddad Foundation, Cosan, Instituto Credit Suisse, and Instituto Arapyaú. Vetor Brasil's fiscal council included Valdir Moysés Simão — who served as Head of the Office of the Comptroller General (2015) and as Minister of Planning, Budget, and Management (2015–2016) under President Dilma Rousseff (PT, center left) — and Zeina Latif, an economist who has held roles as Chief Economist at XP Investimentos and Secretary of Economic Development for the State of São Paulo (2022) under Rodrigo Garcia governorship (PSDB, center right).

Under Toyota's leadership, Vetor Brasil became the first non-governmental organization outside the U.S. to receive philanthropic investment from MacKenzie Scott. Beyond her work with Vetor Brasil, Toyota is involved in global public administration networks, serving on the board of Apolitical, an international institution that provides training for civil servants worldwide. In 2019, she was named a Young Global Leader at the World Economic Forum.

Toyota frequently gives interviews on education and civil service reform in Brazil. She has advocated for overhauling recruitment and development processes in the public sector, suggesting wider use of résumé screening, interviews and assessment centers. She has also publicly opposed proposed changes to the governance law for state-owned enterprises (supported by some members of the Luiz Inácio Lula da Silva third administration) arguing that the existing legislation, enacted under President Michel Temer, contributed to more professional management and board appointments.

Vetor Brasil's programs are also recognized for their commitment to promoting the gender and ethnic-racial diversity agenda in the public sector. Joice Toyota is one of the signatories of a pact of non-profit organizations for the promotion of racial equity in Brazil, signed in 2021, and is one of the members of the board of a civil society coalition that promotes actions for the reform of the Brazilian civil service (Movimento Pessoas à Frente), which has been active in promoting the renewal and expansion of the racial quota law in the Brazilian public service.

Under Toyota's direction, Vetor Brasil was cited in 2019 by the Organisation for Economic Co-operation and Development (OECD) as an innovative organization helping Brazilian governments adopt merit-based recruitment processes for public leadership positions. She has also published work on human resources management reforms in the public sector, focusing on attracting young professionals to a civil service with an aging workforce. Some of these publications were co-authored with Francisco Gaetani, who served as President of Brazil's National School of Public Administration and later as Special Secretary for State Transformation under the Lula administration.

== Early life and education ==
Joice Toyota Mendes was born in São Bernardo do Campo, Brazil. She studied Electrical Engineering at the Polytechnic School of the University of São Paulo (USP) from 2002 to 2006. During her undergraduate studies, she was involved with junior enterprise initiatives and served as president of the Federation of Junior Enterprises of the State of São Paulo (FEJESP).

After completing her engineering degree, she furthered her education at Stanford University in the United States. Between 2013 and 2015, she earned an MBA and a Master's in Education. During her time at Stanford, she was an Education Pioneers Graduate School Fellow with Teach For America and became an alumna of the Lemann Center for Educational Entrepreneurship and Innovation in Brazil at the Stanford Graduate School of Education.

== Career ==
=== Early professional experience ===
During her undergraduate studies, Joice worked as a consultant with Poli Júnior. Following this, she served as the CEO of FEJESP (from July 2003 to December 2005), managing a federation of 30 junior enterprises in the state of São Paulo. She worked later as a Case Team Leader at Bain & Company from February 2009 to January 2013, where she led project teams in sectors including aviation, agribusiness, financial services, and education policy. As part of her work in education, she served as a consultant to the Secretariat of Education of the State of Amazonas in 2011. Years later, in 2019, Gedeão Amorim, who was Secretary of Education of Amazonas at the time of her consultancy work, was convicted on corruption charges.

=== Public sector engagement ===
In February 2013, Joice began working in the public sector as the Director of Project Management at the Secretariat of Education of the State of Goiás, a position she held until June 2013. In that role, she designed evaluation methodologies for educational policies, set performance targets for 900 state schools based on standardized assessments, and coordinated a US$65 million bidding process for the construction of 36 schools in vulnerable areas. She also structured a portfolio of 20 projects under the “Pact for Education in the State of Goiás,” which received support from Bain & Company and was criticized by some experts for the influence of international organizations, such as the World Bank, in shaping the project.

=== Social entrepreneurship ===
From June 2015 to December 2023, Joice Toyota Mendes co-founded and served as the executive director of Vetor Brasil, a nonprofit organization that partnered with state and municipal governments across Brazil to strengthen public management capacity. The organization received funding from institutions such as the Lemann Foundation, Natura Institute, Itaú Social, VélezReys+ (founded by David Vélez, co-founder of Nubank), and Imaginable Futures (founded by Pierre Omidyar, founder of eBay). In 2023, Vetor Brasil received a donation from philanthropist MacKenzie Scott, marking the first time a nonprofit outside the U.S. was included in her global funding initiatives. In January 2024, Vetor Brasil merged with Instituto Gesto to form Motriz, a rare consolidation in the Brazilian nonprofit sector.

=== Teaching and academic engagement ===
Joice Toyota Mendes has participated as a guest lecturer in higher education courses focused on public administration and professional development. In 2019, she taught the elective course My Impact Career (Minha Carreira de Impacto) at the Fundação Getulio Vargas (FGV EAESP), invited by the undergraduate program in Public Administration. In 2020, she taught a similar course at the School of Arts, Sciences, and Humanities at the University of São Paulo (EACH-USP). Both courses focused on preparing students for careers in the public sector and social impact organizations.

=== Advisory and board roles ===
Joice Toyota Mendes has held several advisory and governance roles in organizations focused on public administration, education, and governance. From March 2018 to December 2018, she was appointed by then-President Michel Temer to Brazil's Council for Economic and Social Development (Conselho de Desenvolvimento Econômico e Social, known as the Conselhão). Since April 2018, she has been affiliated with Todos Pela Educação, a coalition advocating for education policy reforms in Brazil.

In December 2020, she joined the Strategic Council of Fundação Estudar. Since July 2023, she has been a member of the Compliance, Governance, Audit, and Ethics Committee at Umane, a philanthropic organization focused on public health initiatives.

Toyota also serves as a Global Advisor for the Apolitical Foundation, alongside ascendant and global leaders such as Helen Clark, former Prime Minister of New Zealand (1999–2008), and Alexander Stubb, former Prime Minister (2014–2015) and president of Finland since 2024. She is also on the advisory board of the Center for Advocacy and Global Growth (CAGG), a Geneva-based nonprofit supporting Global South organizations.

She is a member of the Governance Board for Movimento Pessoas à Frente, a civil society coalition dedicated to civil service reform in Brazil. Additionally, she is a board member of ImpulsoGov, a nonprofit (govtech) that works with data-driven solutions to improve public health services in Brazil's Sistema Único de Saúde, or Unified Health System.

== Recognition and awards ==
=== Personal recognitions ===
Joice Toyota Mendes has been recognized for her contributions to public management, civil service reform, and nonprofit administration. Her recognitions include:

- Young Global Leader (2019) – World Economic Forum.
- Prêmio Veja-se de Políticas Públicas (2017) – Veja Magazine – Recognized as a finalist in the Public Policy category for contributions to social impact in Brazil.
- Stanford Social Innovation Fellow (2015) – Stanford Graduate School of Business Center for Social Innovation – Supported to launch a nonprofit addressing social or environmental needs.
- Person of the Year Fellow (2014) – Brazilian-American Chamber of Commerce.
- Education Pioneers Fellow (2014) – Leadership development program for education sector professionals.

=== Vetor Brasil and Motriz awards under her leadership ===
Under Toyota's leadership, Vetor Brasil and Motriz received multiple recognitions for their impact on public sector capacity-building and governance innovation. These include:

- 2024 Social Responsibility Award in Leadership Development (2024) – Brazilian-American Chamber of Commerce – Awarded to Motriz for its contributions to leadership development and public sector capacity-building in Brazil.
- Mackenzie Scott Grant (2022) – Vetor Brasil became the first nonprofit in Brazil to receive a philanthropic investment from MacKenzie Scott.
- Hertie School Partnership (2021) – The Hertie School, a prestigious Berlin-based school of government, formalized a partnership with Vetor Brasil to support the studies of its alumni.
- OECD Recognition (2019) – Organisation for Economic Co-operation and Development (OECD) cited Vetor Brasil as an innovative organization in leadership recruitment for the public sector.
- Google Impact Challenge Brazil (2016) – Google.org – Vetor Brasil was selected among the top five non-profits using technology to tackle social challenges.

== Publications ==
=== Academic publications ===
Toyota has contributed to research and discussions on public administration, civil service reform, and leadership in government. Some of her academic and policy-related publications include:

- Toyota, J. (2019). Talentos en el sector público brasileño: el resultado de una colaboración innovadora entre sociedad civil y Estado [Talent in the Brazilian public sector: The result of an innovative collaboration between civil society and the state]. Revista del CLAD Reforma y Democracia, 73, 151–188. https://clad.org/wp-content/uploads/2021/04/073-05-JToyota.pdf
- Lamelo, T. M., Mendes, J. T., Alessio, M. F., & Andrade, T. K. B. (2017, December). Processo seletivo público para escolha de secretário municipal: Análise da experiência da cidade de Londrina, PR [Public selection process for municipal secretary: Analysis of the experience in Londrina, PR]. RACE - Revista de Administração, Contabilidade e Economia. https://doi.org/10.18593/race.v0i0.15106
- Canziani, A., Toyota, J., Alessio, M. F., & Lamelo, T. M. (2017, July). Processo seletivo público para escolha de secretário municipal: Análise da experiência da cidade de Londrina, PR [Public selection process for municipal secretary: Analysis of the experience in Londrina, PR]. Paper presented at the X Congresso CONSAD de Gestão Pública, Brasília, Brazil. Retrieved February 1, 2024, from https://consad.org.br/wp-content/uploads/2017/05/Painel-06_01.pdf.

=== Opinion articles ===
Toyota has written op-eds and commentaries on public administration, governance, and civil service reform in major Brazilian media outlets, including *Folha de S. Paulo* and *Brazil Journal*. Some of her opinion articles include:

- Toyota, J. (2024, November 4). Como an emergência climática afeta diretamente an educação pública no Brasil [How the climate emergency directly affects public education in Brazil]. The Conversation. https://theconversation.com/como-a-emergencia-climatica-afeta-diretamente-a-educacao-publica-no-brasil-241546
- Toyota, J. (2022, December 24). Soluções para uma melhor transição de governo [Solutions for a better government transition]. JOTA. Retrieved February 1, 2025, from https://www.jota.info/artigos/solucoes-para-uma-melhor-transicao-de-governo
- Toyota, J., & Leite, R. (2022, December 22). Lei das Estatais: Mudar para quê? [State-Owned Enterprises Law: Change for what?]. Brazil Journal. Retrieved February 1, 2024, from https://braziljournal.com/lei-das-estatais-mudar-para-que/
- Toyota, J. (2022, August 4). Precisamos falar mais sobre pessoas no setor público [We need to talk more about people in the public sector] (Op-ed). Folha de S.Paulo. https://www1.folha.uol.com.br/opiniao/2022/08/precisamos-falar-mais-sobre-pessoas-no-setor-publico.shtml
- Toyota, J. (2018, December 4). Países da América Latina discutem qualidade da gestão pública [Latin American countries discuss the quality of public management]. JOTA. Retrieved February 1, 2025, from https://www.jota.info/coberturas-especiais/inova-e-acao/gestao-publica-qualidade
- Gaetani, F., Toyota, J., & Cançado, M. (2019, November 27). Test drive cívico: É preciso preparar profissionais para o serviço público [Civic test drive: Preparing professionals for public service] (Op-ed). Folha de S.Paulo. https://www1.folha.uol.com.br/opiniao/2019/11/test-drive-civico.shtml

== Family ==
Joice Toyota Mendes is married and of Japanese descent.
