= Carol Yu =

Host of weekly TV interview show "Visionaries" on Phoenix TV

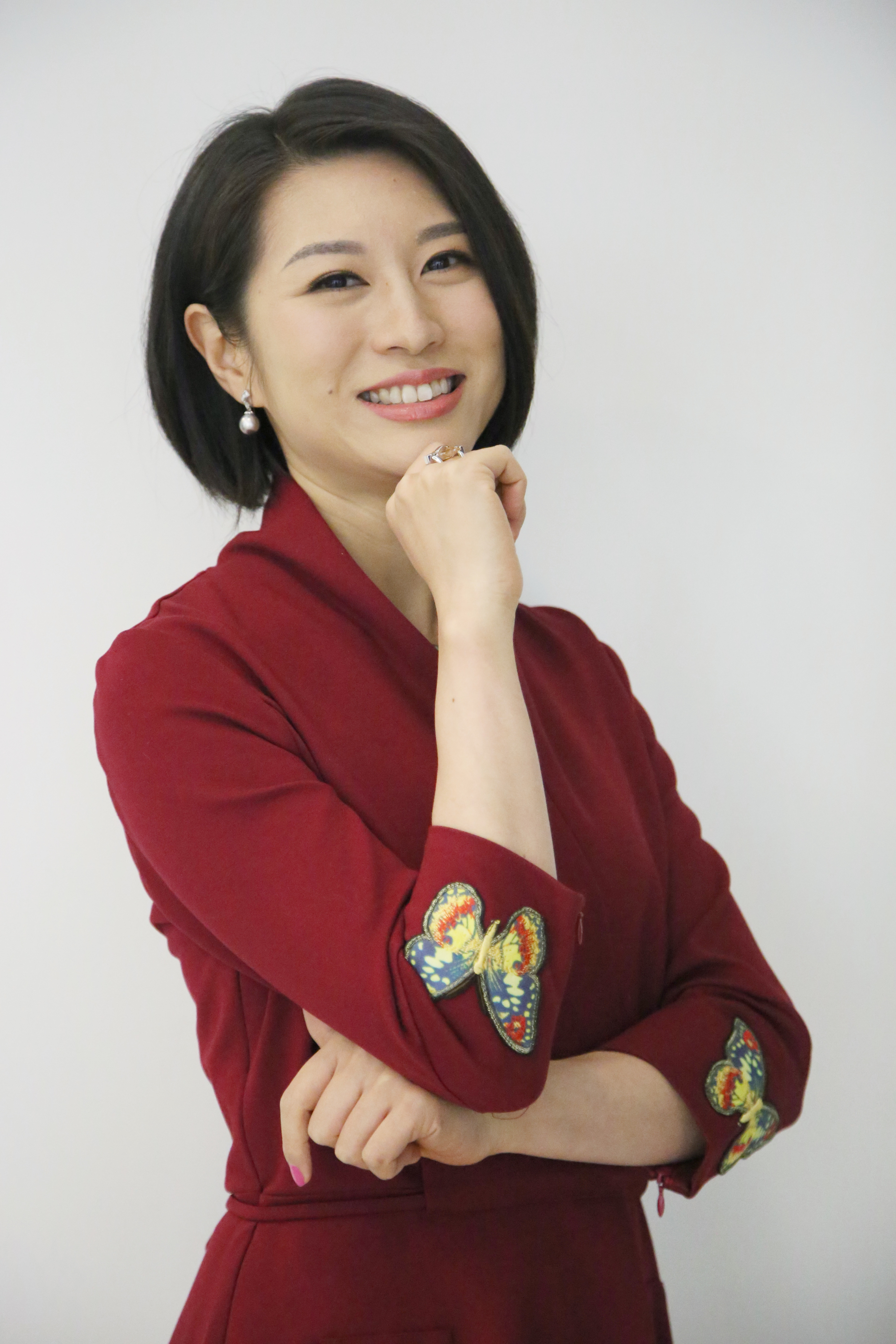
- Carol in 2017

Personal details
- Born: January 18, 1983 (age 43) Guangzhou, China
- Education: Stanford University Harvard University, John F. Kennedy School of Government
- Occupation: Stanford University Harvard University, John F. Kennedy School of Government

Carol (Ying) Yu (Chinese: 于盈; pinyin: Yu Ying; born January 18, 1983) is a Chinese journalist and writer who is the associate dean of Shenzhen InnoX Academy, former assistant chief editor, producer, and host of the weekly television interview show “Visionaries” on Phoenix TV. She was selected as a Young Global Leader by the World Economic Forum. She has also been chosen as one of the Ten Outstanding New Hong Kong Young Persons. Before joining Phoenix TV, Carol was with the Investment Banking Division of Morgan Stanley and the World Bank. Carol received her undergraduate degree in Economics from Stanford University and a Master’s in Public Policy from Harvard Kennedy School.

== Early life and education ==
Carol was born in Guangzhou, Guangdong, the only child of Yu Youjun, a minister-level government official and academic, and Xu Ming, a media executive. As a child, Carol excelled at her studies.

Carol was educated at The Affiliated High School of South China Normal University (华南师范大学附属中学), the top public high school in Guangdong Province, and completed her high school studies at San Domenico School, California’s first independent school (est. 1850) in the U.S., before enrolling in Stanford University. After an internship at Morgan Stanley during her sophomore year, she graduated early with honors and joined Morgan Stanley after her junior year. After a few years of work experience, Carol returned to school and obtained a Master’s in Public Policy degree from Harvard Kennedy School.

Carol has been very active in extracurricular activities throughout her life. She held various leadership positions in student government and was very active in various performing arts throughout her elementary school, middle school and high school in China. She founded a student magazine at middle school and was the first student president of the school TV station while she was at high school in China. She has also started writing and publishing since young age. While first moved to the U.S. at junior year in high school, which was a school known for its excellence in fine arts, reading a whole book in English for the first time, Carol was cast in the leading roles of several school musicals and plays including Children of Eden and Pippen. While at Stanford, she was one of the founding members and vice-president for “Forum for American Chinese Exchange at Stanford” (FACES), vice-president for “Association of Chinese Students and Scholars at Stanford” (ACSSS), and co-founder of a political forum “Bursting the Bubble.” While at Harvard Kennedy School, she was chair of the Chinese Students Association, Co-Chair of East Asia Students Association, and Co-Chair of Asia Business Conference.

== Media career ==
Carol began her media career at Phoenix TV as a reporter and news presenter. Later, upon deciding to rejoin Phoenix TV after obtaining a master's degree at Harvard Kennedy School, she was tasked with launching the new radio business for the group. Being head of the radio station at 28, she was the youngest head of any major media channel in Hong Kong. She was responsible for the launching and running of a new radio business in Hong Kong, as well as leading the efforts in expanding Phoenix’s multinational network in Mainland China and abroad. Carol has interviewed many top politicians, businessmen, media personalities, academics, artists, athletes, etc., and remains active as a columnist in several leading publications in China.

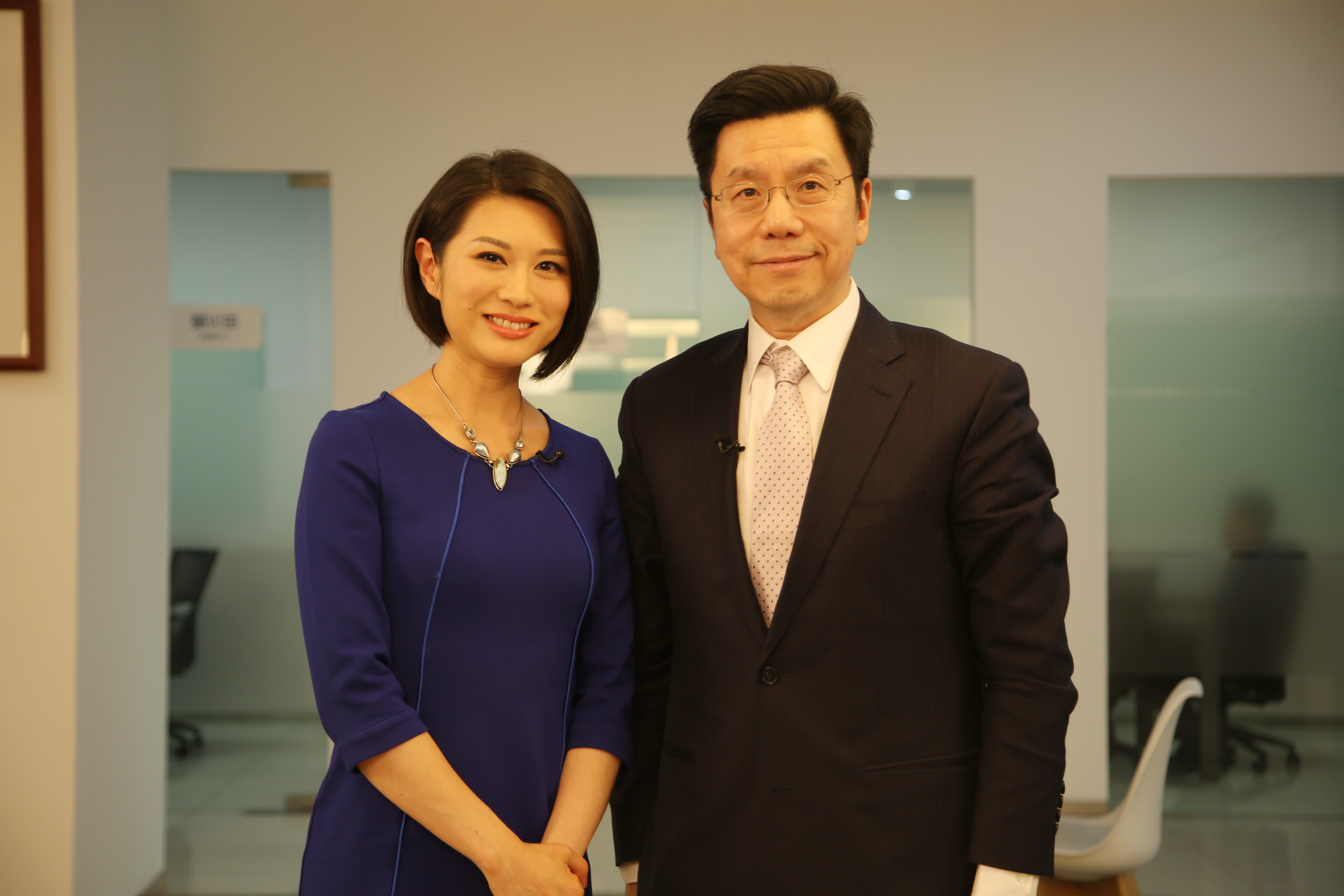
Caro interviewing Kai-Fu Lee in "Visionaries"

In April 2017, Phoenix TV launched a weekly television interview show, "Visionaries," with Carol Yu serving as the Assistant Chief Editor, Producer and Host. The show focuses on the future of technology, health, education and society to help people understand change and prepare for change. “Visionaries” has won Gold Award of “Best Business & Finance Profile Interview” of HSMC Business Journalism Awards for 3 years, and Top 5 of the Hurun China Most Influential Business TV Program in 2020. She was selected as Young Global Leaders by the World Economic Forum and Ten Outstanding New Hong Kong Young Persons.

== Innovation Education ==
In 2021, Carol Yu turned her focus towards innovation and entrepreneurship education by taking on the role of Associate Dean at the Shenzhen InnoX Academy. The Academy was founded with Professor Li Zexiang. After two years, InnoX has produced more than 200 full-time entrepreneurs, with a total of around 40 projects.

Moreover, Yu's passion for education is also reflected in her literary contribution. In 2020, she published her first book, where she shares her insights into educational innovation, drawing from her interactions with leaders in the field. Through her narrative, Yu provides a window into her personal experiences, the influence of her upbringing, and her approach to parenting in today's dynamic world.

== Personal life ==
Carol Yu is an experienced tri-lingual speaker, and has conducted interviews in English, Mandarin Chinese and Cantonese Chinese. She is also a regular columnist at Southern Metropolis Daily (南方都市報) (a Chinese newspaper with the largest circulation in mainland China) and Caixin Media (财新) (the most respected finance media in mainland China), and Ta Kung Pao (大公报) (the oldest active Chinese newspaper in Hong Kong).
