= Nyker =

- Town
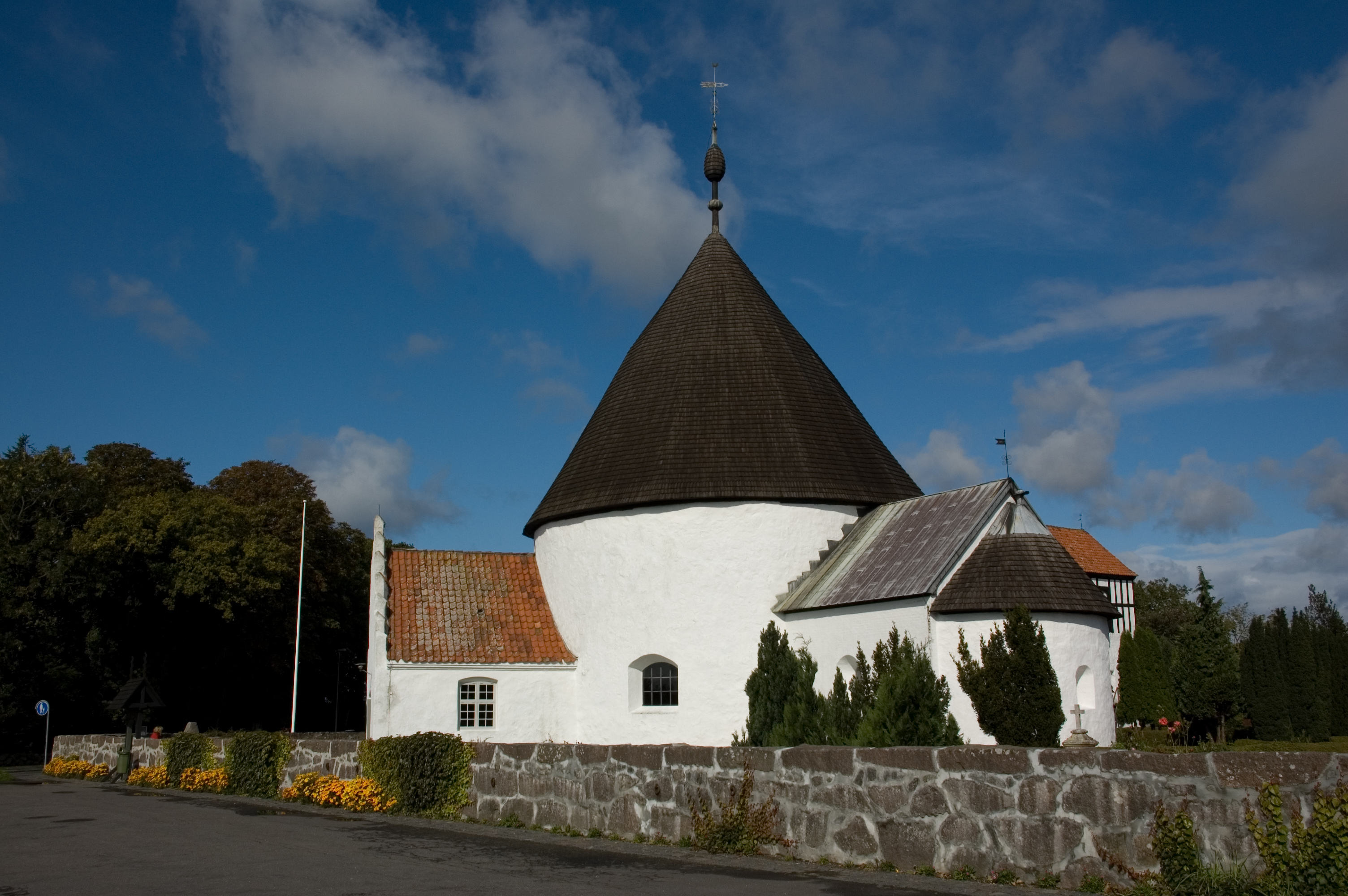

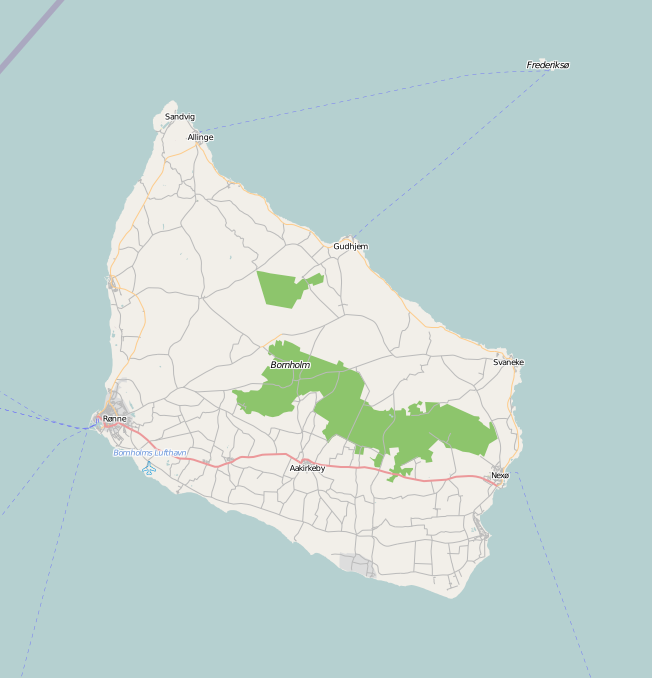
- Location on Bornholm
- Coordinates: 55°08′22″N 14°45′40″E
- Country: Denmark
- Region: Capital (Hovedstaden)
- Municipality: Bornholm

Population (2026)
  - Total: 674
- Time zone: UTC+1 (CET)
  - Summer (DST): UTC+2 (CEST)

Nyker is a small town on Bornholm with a population of 674 (1 January 2026). It is located 7.2 kilometres (4.5 mi) by road northeast of Rønne.

Nyker has one of Bornholm's four round churches, Ny Kirke; the names of both church and village mean "new church". The artist Bente Hammer, who lives in the village, works with fabrics and designs dresses for clients such as Queen Margrethe and the actress Ghita Nørby. The village is home to Bornholms Frie Idrætsskole (Bornholm Free Sports School) which was founded in 2005 just after the closure of the municipal school. In 2010, there were 179 students from kindergarten through to Grade 9. The Nyker Brød bakery located on the main street delivers its products to the whole of Denmark.

== The railroad ==
Nyker used to have a station on the Rønne-Allinge-Sandvig line (1913-1953) which is now a private house. The pavilion which used to serve Mæby Halt between Nyker and Klemensker has been restored and now stands in the sports area at the Free Sports School.

From Nyker Hovedgade, a 5 km long track, Nordre Jernbanesti, follows the old railroad to Gartnervangen in Rønne where the now demolished Rønne North station was once located.
