= Ny Kirke =

Coordinates: 55°08′22″N 14°46′08″E

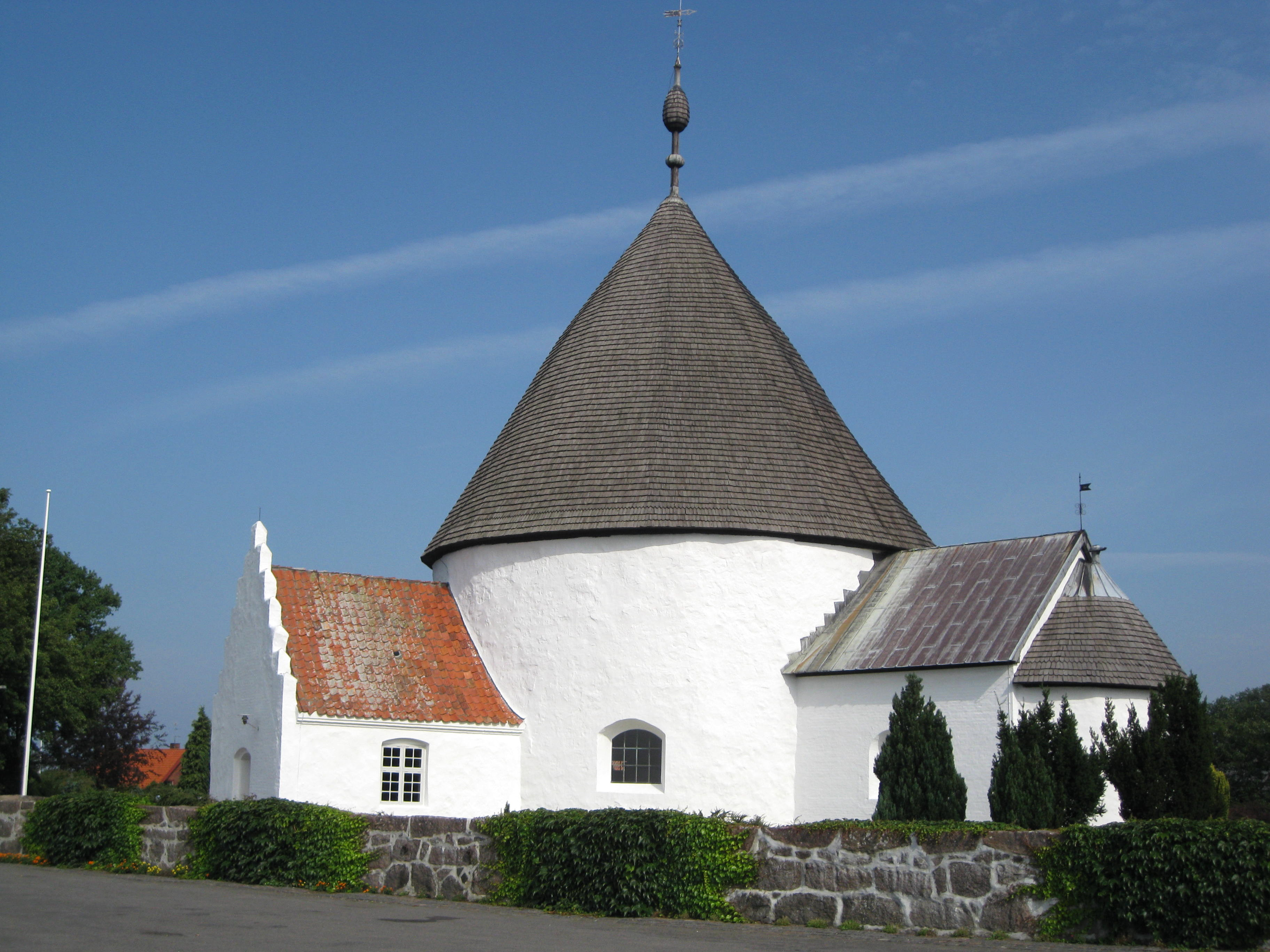
- Ny Kirke
- Location: Nyker
- Country: Danish island of Bornholm
- Denomination: Church of Denmark
- Previous denomination: Catholic

History
- Former name: Ecclesia Omnium Sanctorum

Architecture
- Years built: 12th century

Ny Kirke (New Church) is a 12th-century round church located in the village of Nyker some 7 km from Rønne on the Danish island of Bornholm. Built in the Romanesque style with two storeys, it contains frescos from various periods and a pulpit with 17th century-panels.

== History ==
Like Bornholm's other medieval churches, Ny Kirke was built in the 12th century but is normally considered to be the youngest of the island's four round churches. It was originally called "Ecclesia Omnium Sanctorum" (All Saints Church). The present name dates from the middle of the 16th century.

== Architecture ==
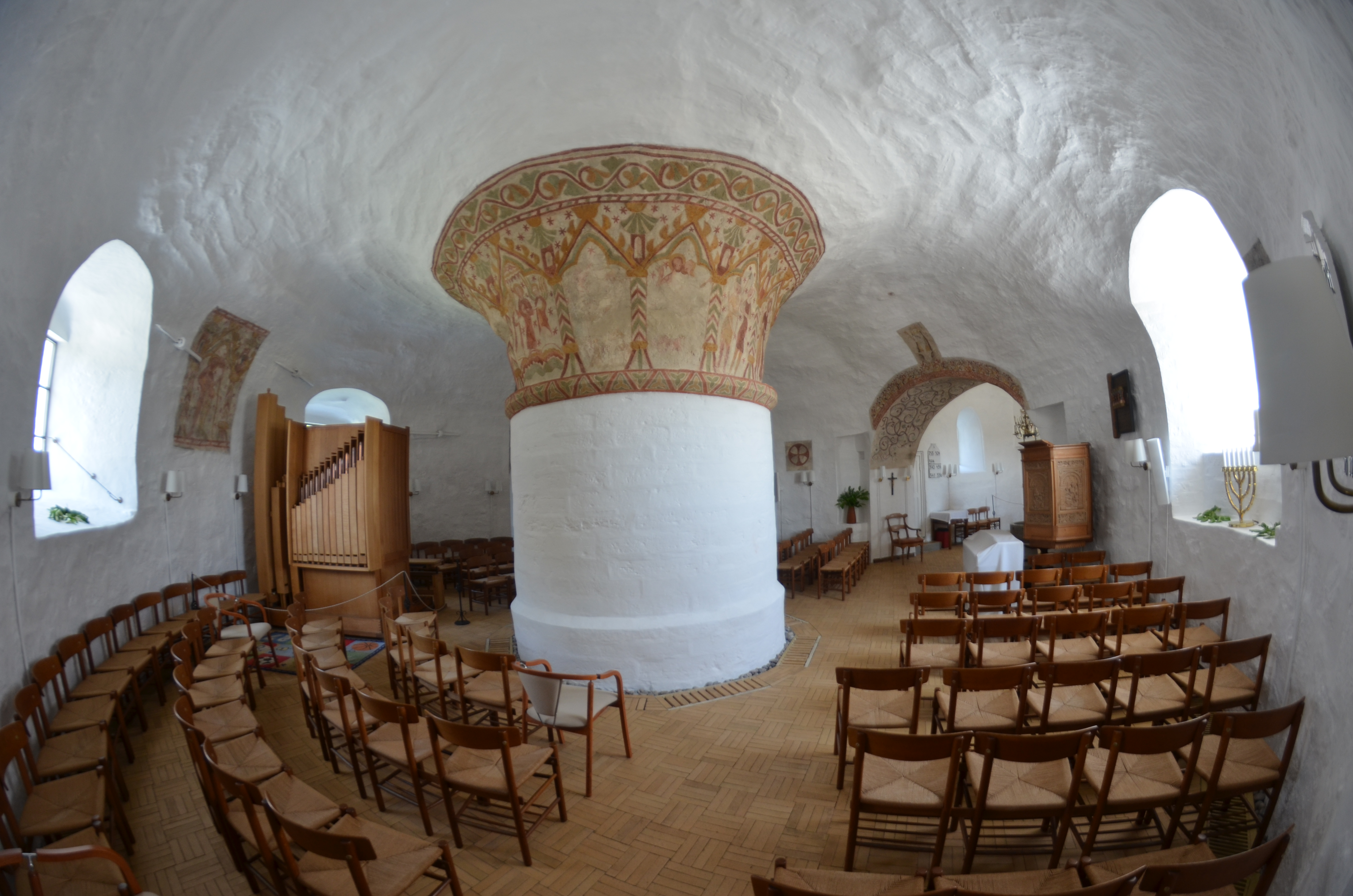
Interior view

The church consists of an apse, a rectangular choir and a round nave, all from the Romanesque period. It is built of granite fieldstone apart from the central column and the window frames which are in finished limestone. The semicircular tympanum over the south door is made from a single block of limestone. The porch, dating from the Late Gothic period, it is somewhat younger than the body of the church itself. The apse has three windows and a half-domed vault while the choir has a barrel vault. The chancel arch has been enlarged judging by the remains of a smaller Romanesque arch. It appears the windows have also been widened. The round pillar at the centre of the nave is about 3 metres wide and about 265 cm high.

A door at the western end of the choir's north wall opens onto an uneven limestone staircase leading to the church's upper storey which is unvaulted and has a bumpy floor. The central round pillar upstairs is similar in breadth to that on the ground floor. It appears as if the upper storey originally had a flat wooden roof which, in view of the many drainage scuppers on the floor, must not have been watertight. It appears doubtful whether the upper floor was built for defensive purposes as some have maintained.

== Frescos ==
A frieze round the top of the central pillar is divided into 13 panels with paintings of the Passion in the early Gothic style. They appear to be from around 1300 or a little later. The colouring is very simple: white, yellow and red ochre and moss green, as are the figures which lack detail. The frescos were discovered by Jacob Kornerup in 1891 and restored by Egmont Lind in 1937. Kornerup also found a fresco to the left of the north door of St Christopher bearing the infant Jesus, probably from the 15th century but in view of its poor condition, it has now been whitewashed over.

Above the north door there is a medallion depicting the Lamb of God with the chalice and the banner of the cross together with two panels illustrating the Annunciation.

== Artefacts ==
The pulpit itself dates from the recent restoration but its carved decorations from the beginning of the 17th century are the work of Hinrich Ringering of Flensburg. The four panels depict Annunciation in Nazareth, the Nativity, the Adoration of the Magi and the Circumcision. The Romanesque font in the choir is of grey limestone imported from Gotland. The chandelier, originally from 1594, was restored in 1688. It bears a stylized split double eagle and two coats of arms. The church's smaller bell is from 1639 was cast for Sallerup Church in Scania while the larger one from 1725 was cast in Lübeck.

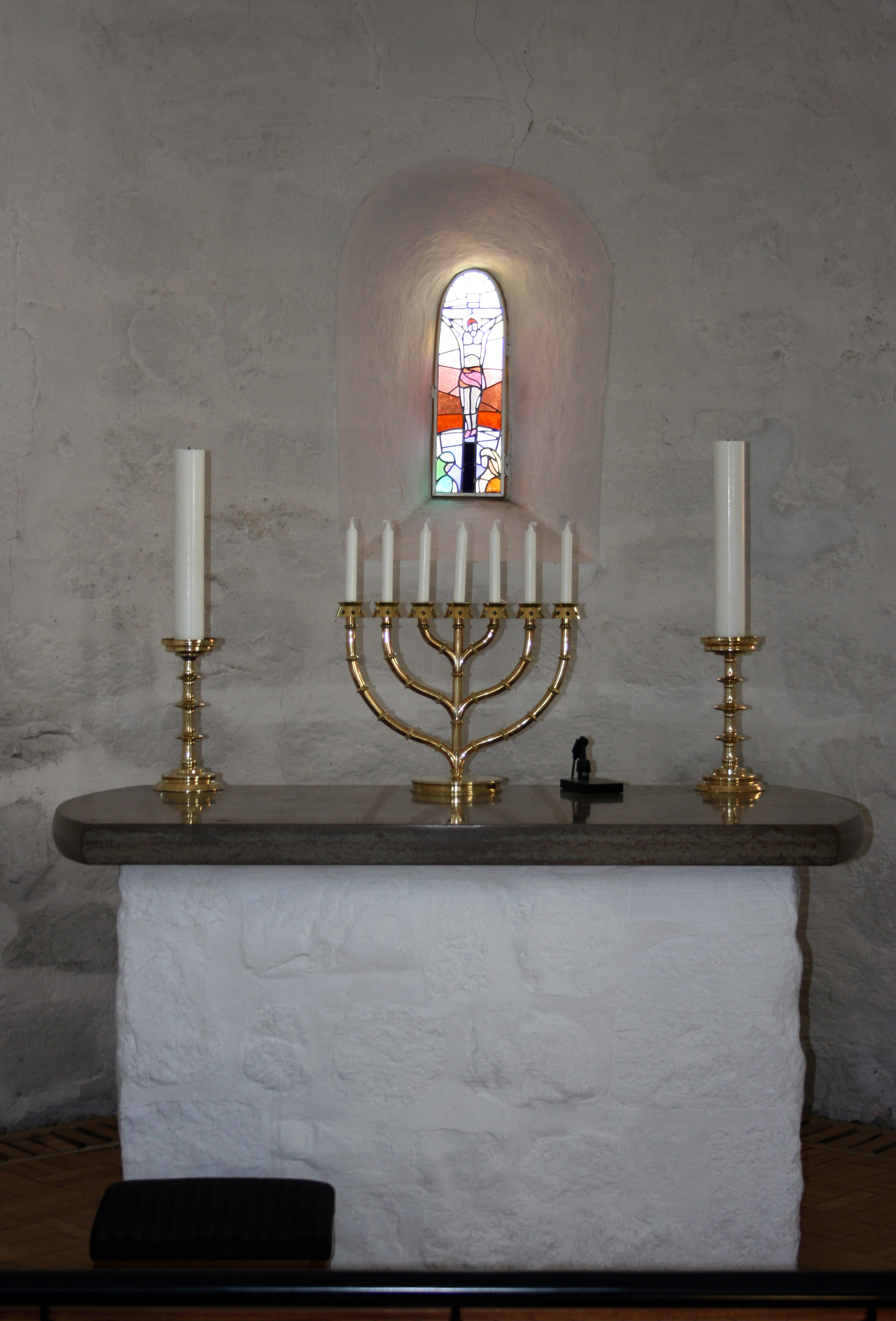
Altar

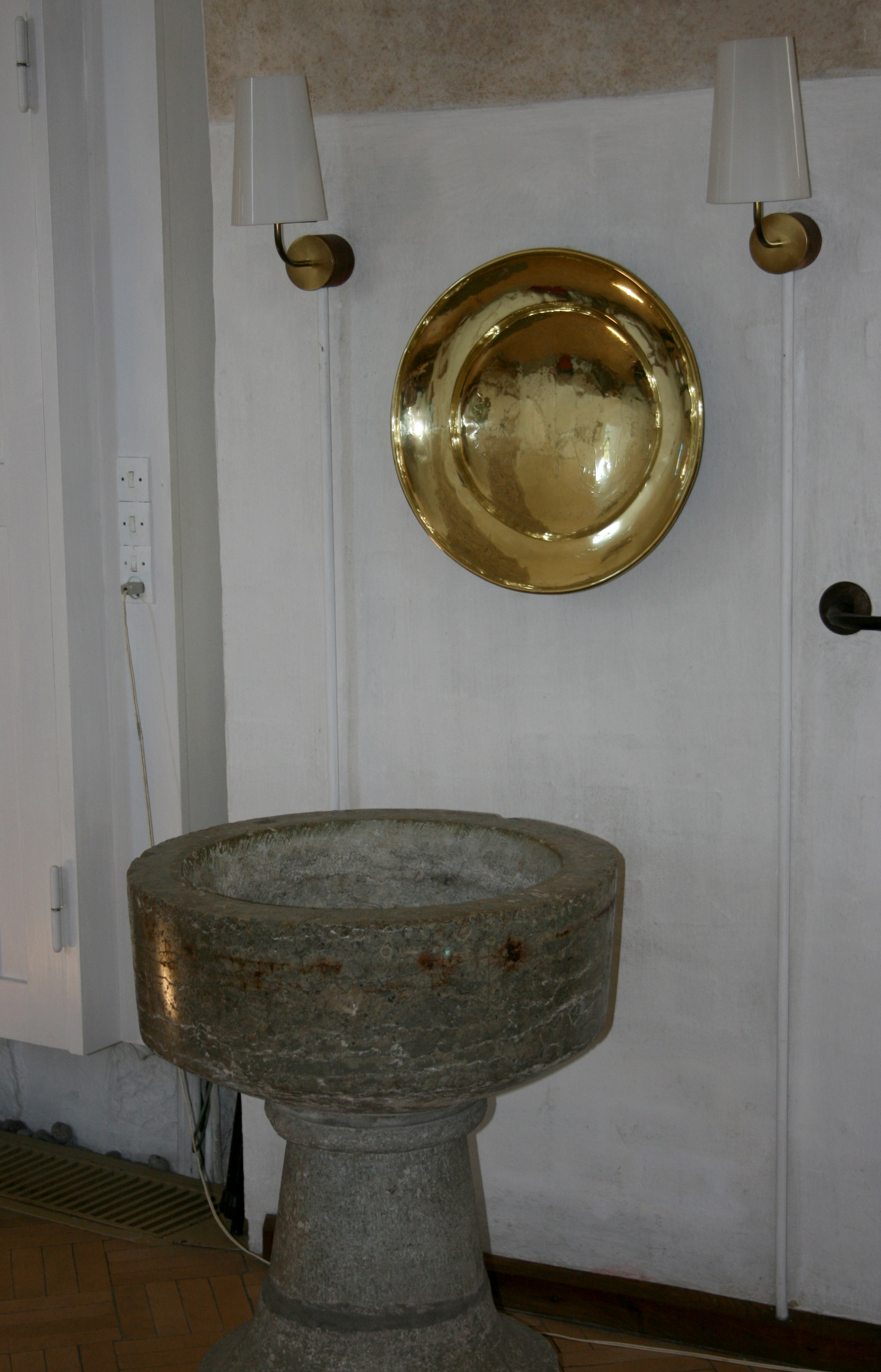
Font

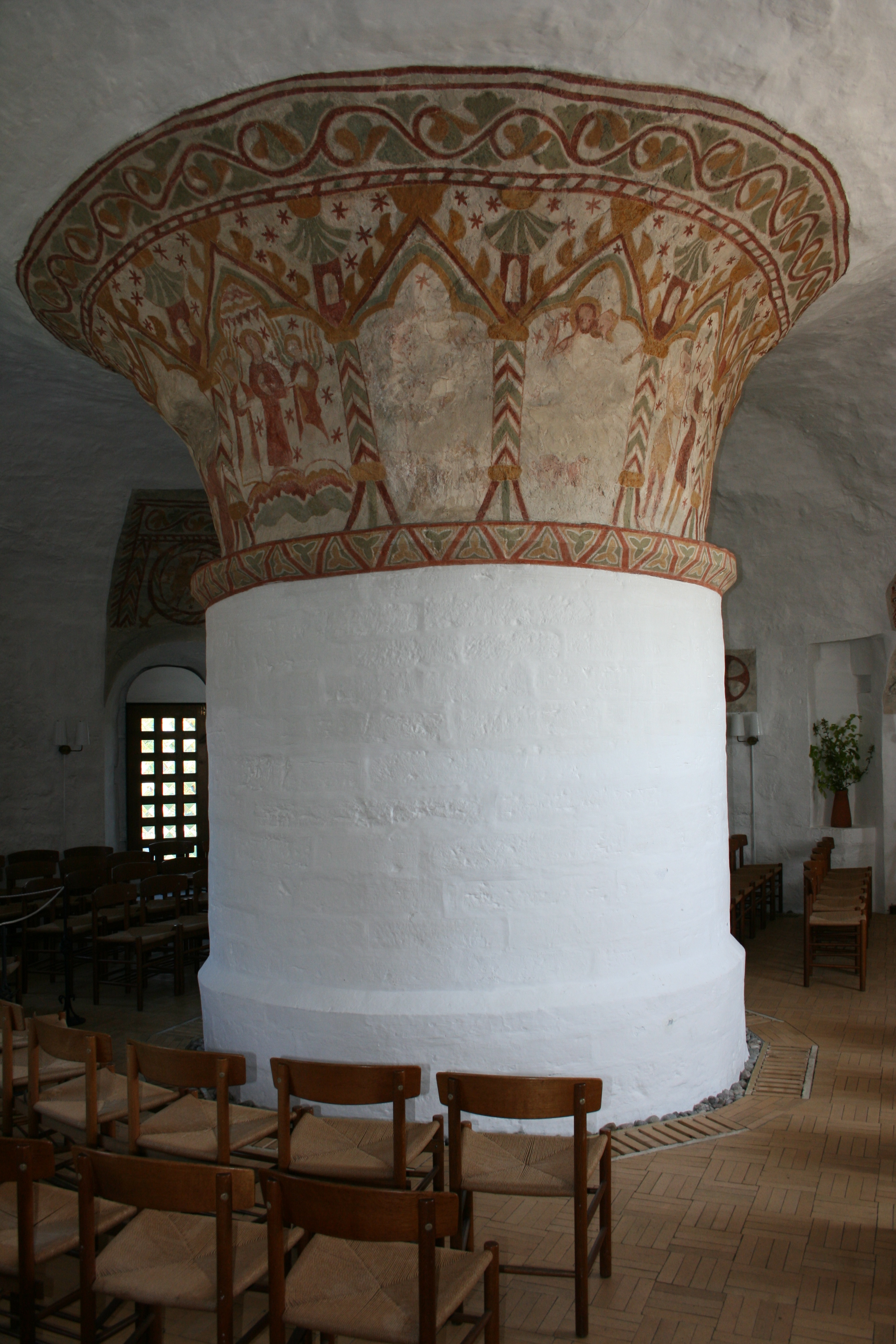
Central column

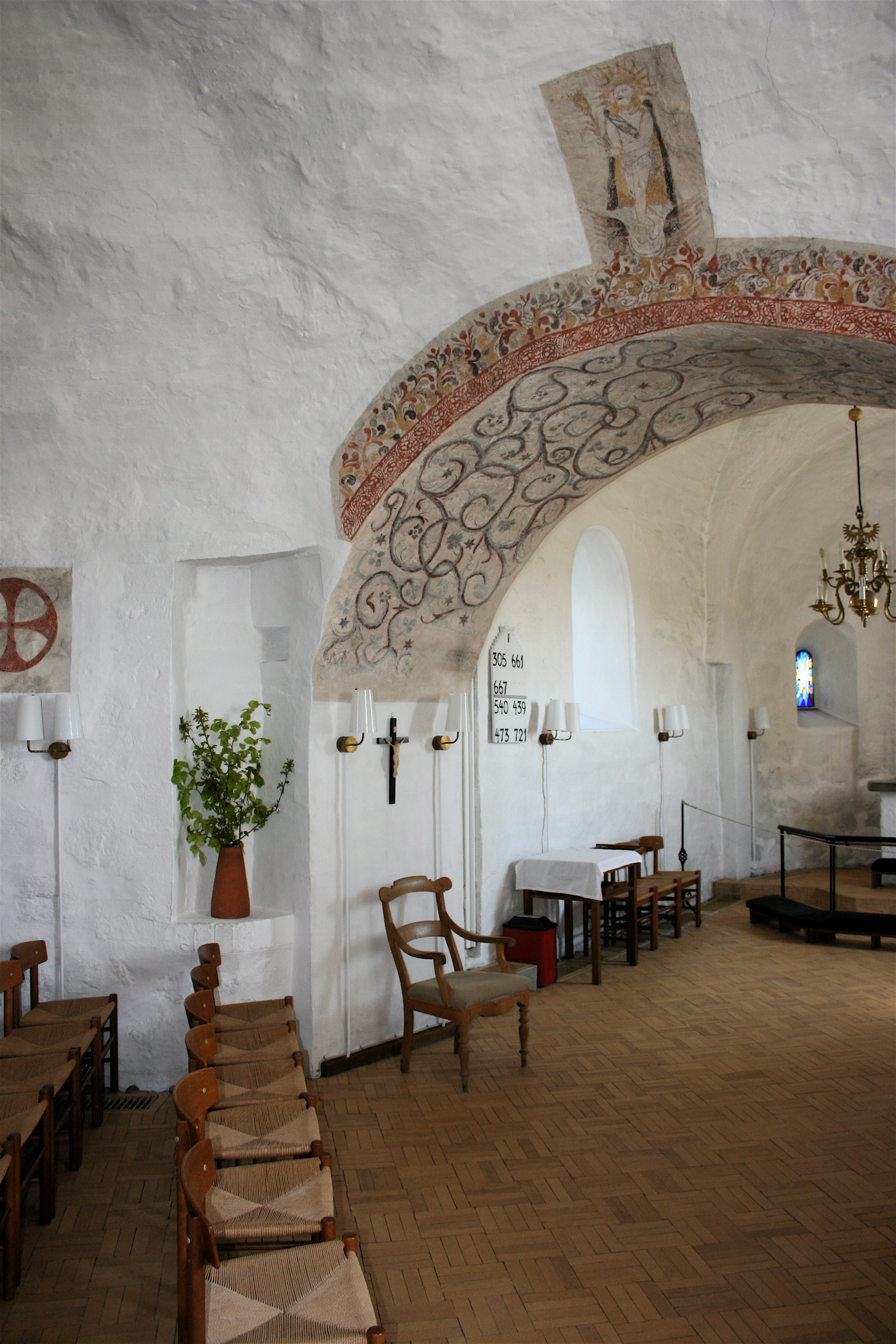
Chancel arch

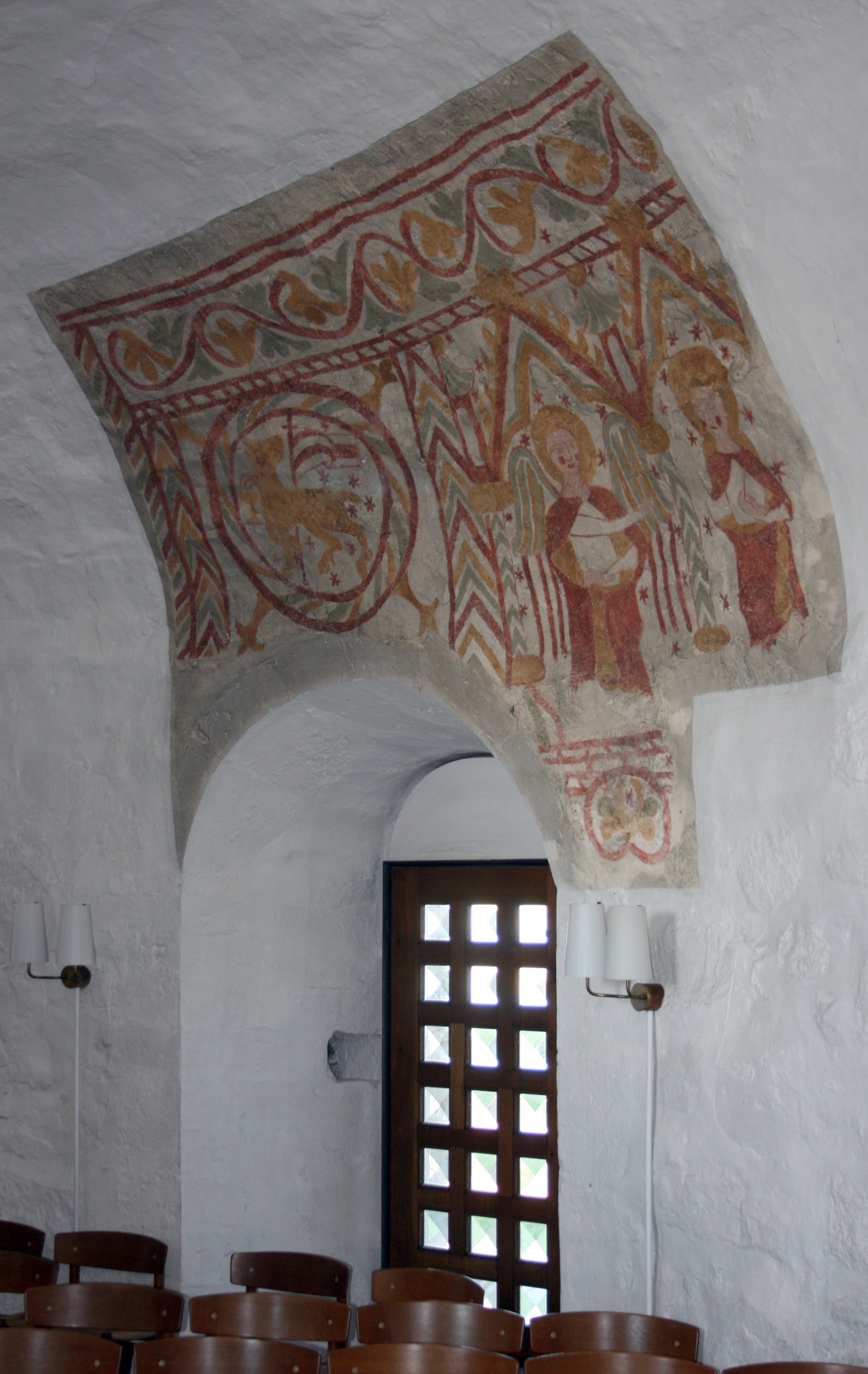
North door fresco

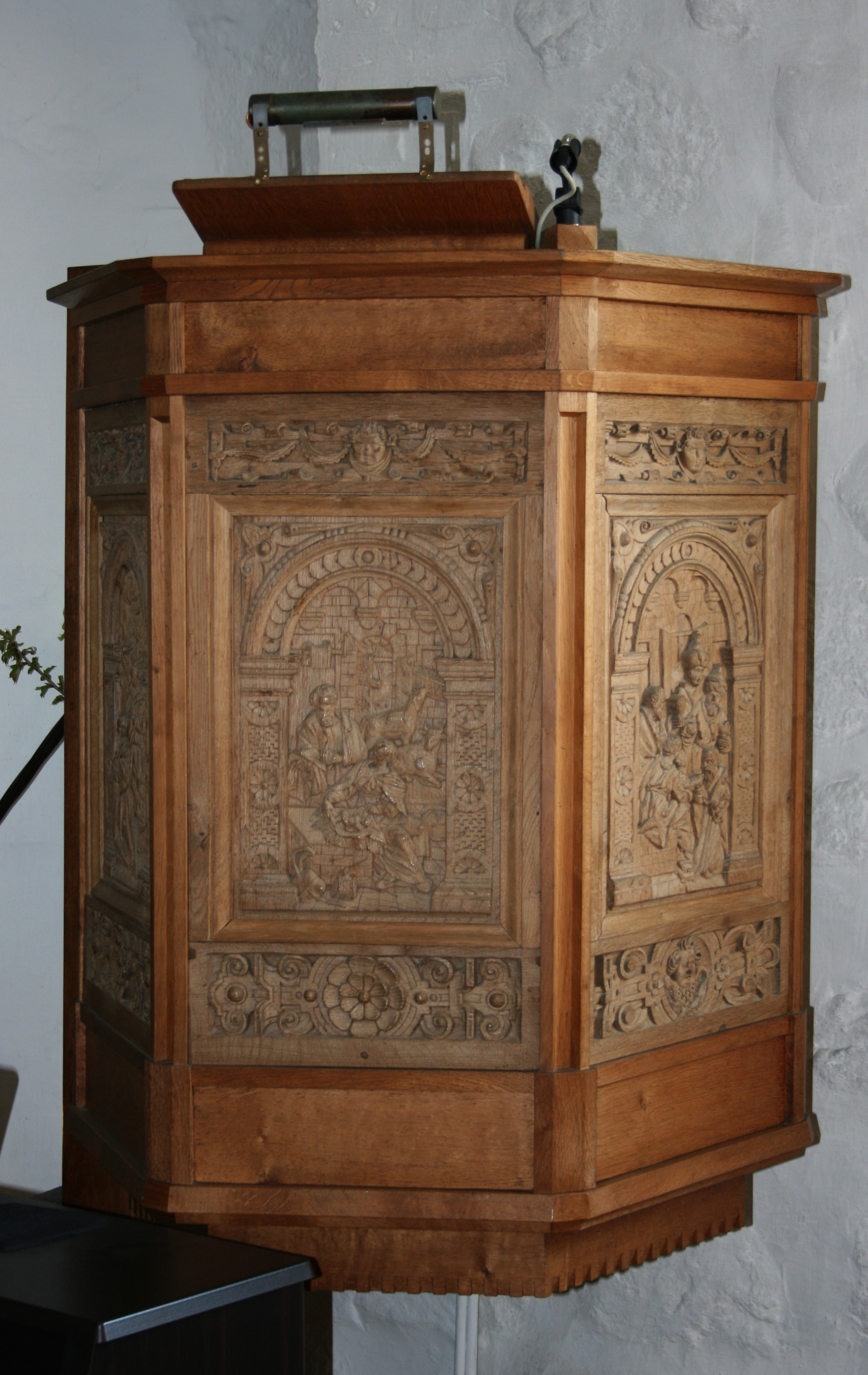
Pulpit

== See also ==
- List of churches on Bornholm
