= Jasandra Nyker =

South African entrepreneur

- Education: University of Cape Town; London Business School
- Occupation: CEO
- Known for: Renewable power development
- Board member of: Emira Property Fund; Investec

Jasandra Nyker is a South African entrepreneur and former CEO of BioTherm Energy, a South African developer of renewable energy sources and power plant operator. She was a managing director of the International Power Fund at Denham Capital, and a board member in the Emira Property Fund. In 2021, she was appointed CEO of Nala Renewables, a company set up by Trafigura and IFM Investors.

== Education ==
Nyker has a bachelor's degree in business science from the University of Cape Town and an MBA from the London Business School, where she was a Merrill Lynch scholar.

== Career ==
After working from Brait SE, and being senior vice president at PCG Asset Management LLC, Jasandra Nyker became CEO of Biotherm Energy in 2011. She participated in renewable energy forums such as the World Economic Forum on Africa, held in Kigali, Rwanda in 2016, and the 2017 Africa CEO Forum in Geneva. In 2019 she became a managing director at Denham Capital, after the sale of Biotherm to Actis Capital. In April 2021 she was appointed CEO of Nala Renewables, a company set up by Trafigura and IFM Investors with the initial goal of reaching a two gigawatts renewables portfolio. At the beginning of her tenure the company acquired a majority stake in Boston-based Swift Current Energy, together with Buckeye Partners. In 2022 the company started construction of a 100 MWh battery project located at Nyrstar’s zinc smelting operation in Balen, Belgium.

Nyker also serves as an nonexecutive director of the Emira Property Fund, and the international banking and wealth management group Investec.

She has supported business school students and young entrepreneurs by chairing the judges' panel for the 2012 Anzisha Prize, and participating in the Odgers Berndtson CEOx1Day programme in 2017.

== Views ==
Nyker has advocated for the importance of renewable energy in Africa as a way to combat poverty, given the abundance of solar and wind natural resources in the continent. In order for power projects to succeed she has emphasized the need for certainty and consistency in government energy policy, and advocated for partnerships between government and the private sector, warning about state capture and failings of utility companies, such as South Africa's Eskom. She has said that the independent power producers help improve power grids run by state utility companies, and that more African countries would benefit from this type of collaboration. However, for 2021 she expected the private renewable market to still dominate, with country-owned renewable power still lagging behind.

== Awards and recognition ==
Nyker was named a World Economic Forum Young Global Leader in 2012. She was included in the "Fifty Changemakers Advancing Gender Equality in South Africa" list, on the occasion of the first 50/50 Day in 2017. In 2019, she received the Outstanding Contribution Award in Power at the African Power, Energy and Water Awards.
