= Klaus Schwab =

Founder of the World Economic Forum (born 1938)

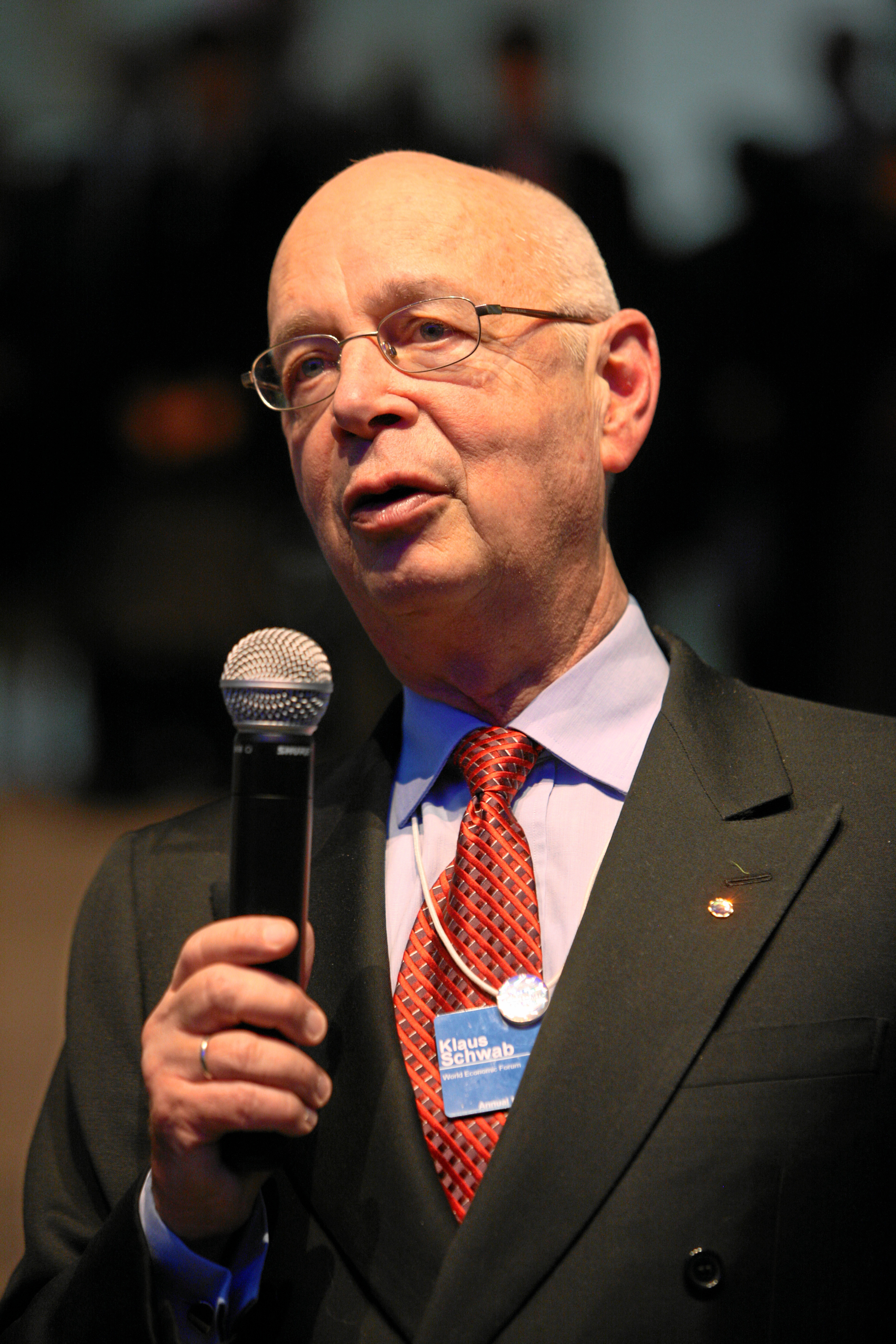
- Schwab in January 2011

Chairman of the World Economic Forum
- In office 24 January 1971 – 21 April 2025
- Preceded by: Office established
- Succeeded by: Peter Brabeck-Letmathe (acting)

Personal details
- Born: 30 March 1938 (age 88) Ravensburg, Gau Württemberg-Hohenzollern, Nazi Germany (now Baden-Württemberg, Germany)
- Spouse: Hilde Stoll (m. 1971)
- Children: 2, including Nicole
- Education: ETH Zürich (Dr. Sc. Tech); University of Fribourg (Dr. Rer. Pol); Harvard University (MPA)
- Klaus Schwab's voice Schwab introducing Canadian Prime Minister Stephen Harper at the 2012 World Economic Forum; Recorded 26 January 2012

Klaus Martin Schwab (German: [klaʊs ˈmaʁtiːn ʃvaːp]; born 30 March 1938) is a German mechanical engineer, economist, and founder of the World Economic Forum (WEF). He was the WEF's chairman from January 1971 until his resignation in April 2025.

== Early life and education ==
Klaus Martin Schwab was born on 30 March 1938, to Eugen Wilhelm Schwab and Erika Epprecht in Ravensburg. His parents had moved from Switzerland to Germany where his father assumed the role of director at the Swiss Escher Wyss AG turbine factory.

Although he has three Swiss grandparents and two Swiss brothers, he is a citizen of Germany and attempts to confer honorary Swiss citizenship have failed.

Schwab attended first and second grades at the primary school in the Wädenswil district of Au, Zürich, in Switzerland. After World War II, Schwab attended the Spohn-Gymnasium in Ravensburg until his Abitur in 1957. In 1961, he graduated as a mechanical engineer from the Swiss Federal Institute of Technology in Zurich, with a doctorate in engineering, with a dissertation titled Der längerfristige Exportkredit als betriebswirtschaftliches Problem des Maschinenbaues (Longer-term export credit as a business problem in mechanical engineering). He also earned a doctorate in economics from the University of Fribourg, and a Master in Public Administration degree from the John F. Kennedy School of Government at Harvard University. While attending Harvard, Schwab found a mentor in future national security advisor and secretary of state Henry Kissinger.

== Career ==
Schwab was professor of business policy at the University of Geneva from 1972 to 2003, and since then has been an honorary professor there.

=== World Economic Forum (1971–2025) ===
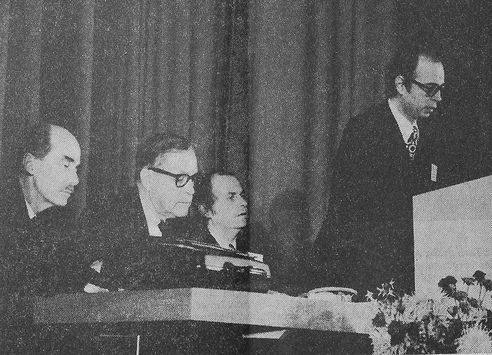
Schwab (rightmost) opens the inaugural European Management Forum in Davos in 1971.

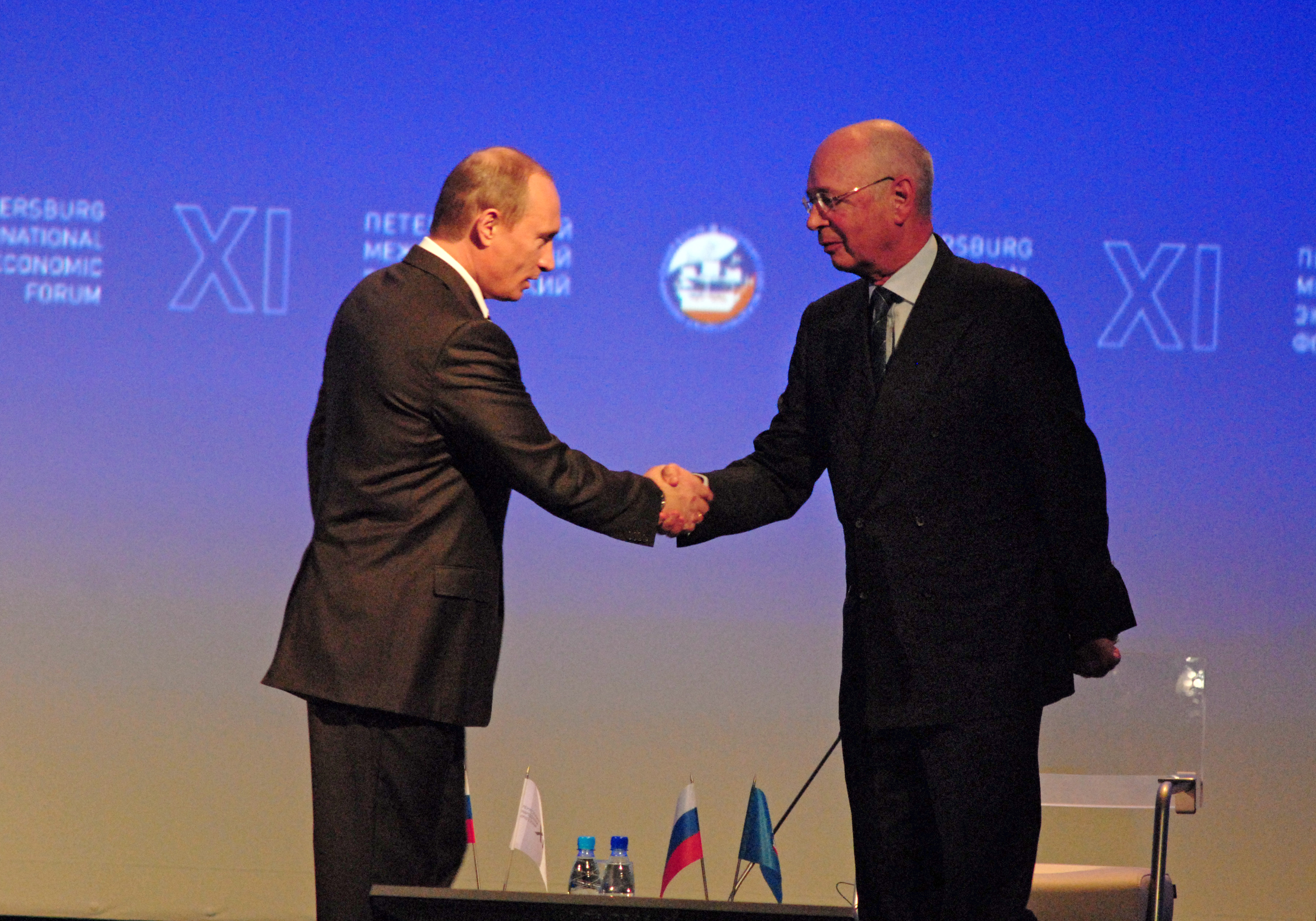
Russian President Vladimir Putin and Schwab shaking hands at the World Economic Forum Russia CEO Roundtable in June 2007

In early 1971, Klaus Schwab – together with his then employee and later wife Hilde Schwab – organized the first European Management Symposium in the newly built Congress Centre in Davos. The event, held from January 24 to February 7, brought together 444 managers, entrepreneurs, faculty members, and media representatives from 31 countries under the motto “Let’s meet the American challenge”.

Financing the meeting proved difficult, and Schwab contributed funds from his own savings and received financial support from his parents. A few days after the first meeting, Schwab founded the non-profit European Management Forum Foundation, which was renamed the World Economic Forum (WEF) in 1987. He financed the foundation's capital of 25,000 Swiss francs from the profits of the first event in Davos, which generated total revenue of approximately two million Swiss francs.

The inaugural meeting in Davos was described as an unexpected success, but the following year the event saw a significant decline in attendance to below 300. Pierre Werner became the first sitting head of government to participate, presenting his so-called Werner Plan for the creation of a European Monetary Union.

In 1972, Schwab refused a management position at Mannesmann and Gutehoffnungshütte and instead accepted a part-time professorship in business policy at the University of Geneva. He held this position until 2003 and has since been an honorary professor there.

At the third meeting in 1973, participants adopted the Davos Manifesto, a code of conduct based on Schwab's stakeholder concept, which states that "The professional function of corporate management is to serve customers, employees, investors, and society, and to balance their conflicting interests."

The events of 1973, namely the collapse of the Bretton Woods fixed exchange rate mechanism, the Yom Kippur War, and the first oil crisis of 1973, significantly increased international attention to the Davos meeting. As a result, the number of participants rose to 780 in 1974 and reached 860 in 1975.

In 1978 Schwab invited Chinese leader Deng Xiaoping, who was leading China on a course of economic liberalization. Although Deng did not attend the forum in person in 1979, Beijing sent for the first time a delegation of high-ranking Chinese economists.

In April 1985, Schwab convened the first regional India Economic Summit in New Delhi with the new Prime Minister Rajiv Gandhi. In November 2009, then Indian Prime Minister Manmohan Singh acknowledged Schwab's role in the context of India's economic opening: "When the history of India's globalization and liberalization is written one day, you (Klaus Schwab) will be represented in the most prominent place."

In 1986 Schwab arranged a first public meeting between Turkish Prime Minister Turgut Özal and Greek Prime Minister Andreas Papandreou, personally inviting both leaders to appear on the same panel in Davos. “That the meeting took place at all is thanks to Klaus Schwab (…) a man with an uncanny knack of bringing together unlikely partners», wrote the Financial Times. Two years later Schwab used shuttle diplomacy to bring the two leaders who were on the brink of war over Cyprus back to Switzerland, where they negotiated and signed the Davos Declaration aimed at normalizing relations.

At the 1987 World Economic Forum annual meeting in Davos, German Foreign Minister Hans-Dietrich Genscher appealed to the West to reach out to the Soviet Union under Mikhail Gorbachev. "Let's take Gorbachev seriously. Let's take him at his word!" Genscher said in his speech, which is considered a turning point in the end of the Cold War. "There was no better place for this speech than Davos," Genscher wrote more than 20 years later. Regarding Schwab, he wrote: "This man is a phenomenon (...) A man full of ideas who gets things done without holding public office; getting things done in the sense of achieving them."

During the 1992 World Economic Forum annual meeting, Nelson Mandela, the South African anti-apartheid activist and chairman of the African National Congress (ANC), appeared outside South Africa for the first time alongside President F. W. de Klerk and the Chief Minister of KwaZulu-Natal, Mangosuthu Buthelezi. To facilitate this historic meeting, Schwab travelled to South Africa several times to negotiate the terms of participation. President Mandela later stated that his time at the WEF had been instrumental in convincing him of the benefits of a market economy.

Schwab and his wife Hilde created the Schwab Foundation for Social Entrepreneurship in 1998. Schwab founded the Global Shapers Community in 2011 within the WEF to work with young people in "shaping local, regional and global agendas." In 2015, the WEF was formally recognised by the Swiss Government as an "international body".

==== Downfall and resignation (2024–2025) ====
In June 2024, The Wall Street Journal reported allegations of harassment and workplace misconduct against Schwab by former WEF employees. The WEF denied the allegations, stating Schwab "has never made sexual advances toward an employee" and calling the claims "vague and false." An independent inquiry found no evidence of "material wrongdoing". Following additional whistleblower allegations of financial impropriety and research manipulation in 2025, the WEF announced an internal investigation. Schwab resigned as chairman in April 2025 and subsequently filed defamation complaints against anonymous whistleblowers, maintaining his innocence while describing the allegations as "stupid and constructed."

=== As author ===
In 1971, Klaus Schwab published Moderne Unternehmensführung im Maschinenbau (Modern corporate management in mechanical engineering).

In 2016 Schwab wrote a book about the Fourth Industrial Revolution, a concept first introduced by a team of scientists developing a high-tech strategy for the German government. Schwab initially introduced the phrase to a wider audience in a 2015 article published by Foreign Affairs. Schwab includes in this fourth era technologies that combine hardware, software, and biology (cyber-physical systems), and emphasises advances in communication and connectivity. Schwab expected this era to be marked by breakthroughs in emerging technologies in fields such as robotics, artificial intelligence, nanotechnology, quantum computing, biotechnology, the internet of things, the industrial internet of things, decentralised consensus, fifth-generation wireless technologies, 3D printing, and fully autonomous vehicles. "Mastering the Fourth Industrial Revolution" was also the 2016 theme of the World Economic Forum Annual Meeting, in Davos-Klosters, Switzerland.

=== The Great Reset and conspiracy theories ===
In June 2020, accompanied by a video message from the then-Prince of Wales, Charles, Schwab launched the Great Reset, a five-point plan to enhance sustainable economic growth following the global recession caused by the COVID-19 pandemic lockdowns. Its stated objective is to support recovery from the global pandemic in a manner that emphasises sustainable development. According to Schwab, the intention of the project is to reconsider the meaning of capitalism and capital. While not abandoning capitalism, he proposes to change and possibly move on from some aspects of it, including neoliberalism and free-market fundamentalism. The 'Great Reset' has also been the target of several conspiracy theories, which heavily overlap with related conspiracy theories concerning the 'New World Order', Qanon, and COVID-19.

In August 2025, Schwab founded the Geneva-based Schwab Academy, through which he publishes a book series on the Intelligent Age.

== Controversies ==
=== Salary level and lack of financial transparency ===
While Schwab declared that excessively high management salaries were "no longer socially acceptable", his own annual salary of about one million Swiss francs (about US$1.2 million) has been repeatedly questioned by the media. The Swiss radio and television corporation SRF mentioned this salary level in the context of ongoing public contributions to the WEF and the fact that the Forum does not pay any federal taxes. Moreover, the former Frankfurter Allgemeine Zeitung journalist Jürgen Dunsch made the criticism that the WEF's financial reports were not very transparent since neither income nor expenditures were broken down. Schwab has also drawn ire for mixing the finances of the not-for-profit WEF and other for-profit business ventures. For example, the WEF awarded a multimillion-dollar contract to USWeb in 1998. Yet shortly after the deal went through, Schwab took a board seat at the same company, reaping valuable stock options.

=== Controversy with Davos municipality ===
In June 2021, Schwab sharply criticised the "profiteering", "complacency" and "lack of commitment" of the municipality of Davos in relation to the WEF annual meeting. He mentioned that the preparation of the COVID-related meeting in Singapore in 2021/2022 had created an alternative to its Swiss host and sees the chance that the annual meeting will stay in Davos at between 40 and 70 per cent.

== Awards and honours ==
Schwab has been conferred with the French Legion of Honour (knight distinction), the Grand Cross with Star of the National Order of Germany, and the Japanese Grand Cordon of the Order of the Rising Sun. He also was awarded the Dan David Prize, and was recognized by Queen Elizabeth as an honorary Knight Commander of the Order of St Michael and St George.

== Publications ==
=== Articles ===
- "Global Corporate Citizenship: Working with Governments and Civil Society". Foreign Affairs, vol. 87, no. 1 (Jan–Feb 2008), pp. 107–18. JSTOR 20020271.

=== Books ===
- The Global Information Technology Report 2001–2002: Readiness for the Networked World | Berkman Klein Center with Geoffrey S. Kirkman, Peter K. Cornelius and Jeffrey D. Sachs, New York, Oxford University Press (2002). ISBN 978-0195152586, ISBN 0195152581.
- The Fourth Industrial Revolution. Geneva: World Economic Forum (2016). ISBN 978-1944835002.
- Shaping the Future of the Fourth Industrial Revolution, with Nicholas Davis. New York: Crown Publishing Group (2018).
- COVID-19: The Great Reset, with Thierry Malleret. Forum Publishing (2020). ISBN 978-2940631124.
- Stakeholder Capitalism: A Global Economy that Works for Progress, People and Planet. Hoboken, NJ: Wiley (2021). ISBN 1119756138, 978-1119756132.
- The Great Narrative: For a Better Future, with Thierry Malleret. Forum Publishing (2022). ISBN 978-2940631315.
- Thriving and Leading in the Intelligent Age, Schwab Academy (2025). ISBN 978-2970195436.
- Longevity and Retirement in the Intelligent Age, Schwab Academy (2025). ISBN 978-2970198826.
- Restoring Truth and Trust: An Agenda for the Intelligent Age, Schwab Academy (2026). ISBN 978-2970195498.
- Universities, Professors, and Students in the Intelligent Age, Schwab Academy (2025). ISBN 978-2970195443.

== Personal life ==
Schwab married Hilde Schwab, his former assistant, in 1971. The wedding took place in Sertig Valley at a Reformed church. The couple lives in Cologny, Switzerland. The Schwabs have two adult children. His daughter, Nicole Schwab, co-founded the Gender Equality Project. His son, Olivier Schwab, was a former head of technology at the WEF.
