= Electric power infrastructure on Bornholm =

Bornholm is connected to the Swedish grid through the Bornholm Cable. The distribution network is owned by Bornholms Energi & Forsyning, formerly Østkraft.

== Rønne Power Station ==
Rønne Power Station has two steam units, one oil-fired with a generation capacity of 25 MW inaugurated in 1974, and a second one, which can be fired either with oil or coal. It was inaugurated in 1995 and has a generation capacity of 37 MW.

== Power grid of Bornholm ==
The power grid of Bornholm consists of a 60 kV-ring line connecting the substations Hasle, Olsker, Østerlars, Dalslunde, Bodilsker, Aakirkeby, Rønne-Syd, Rønne Power Station, Viadukten, Snorrebakken. Apart from the section between Ronne-Syd and Snorrebakken, it is an overhead line. From this ring line several 60 kV lines branch, which are all implemented as underground cables. These are the branch to Allinge starting at Olsker, that to Gudhjem starting at Østerlars, a branch to Svaneke starting at Dalslunde, a branch to Svaneke via Nexo starting at Bodilsker, a branch to Poulsker starting at Bodilker. A further branch to Westhaven starts at Rønne Power Station. A further connection built as underground cable connects Hasle substation with Rønne-Nord, Viadukten and Ronne-South.

=== Technical data of 60 kV Substations of Bornholm ===
Substation	Coordinates	Year of inauguration	Count of transformers	Transformer (MVA)	Count of 10 kV feeders	Remarks
Aakirkeby	55°4′5″N 14°53′52″E	1967	2	16.0	10	
Allinge	55°16′6″N 14°48′1″E	1984	2	20.0	4	
Bodilsker	55°3′47″N 15°3′57″E	1959	2	14.0	6	
Dalslunde	55°6′0″N 15°3′3″E		0	0	0	Switching Station, no transformers
Gudhjem	55°11′57″N 14°57′11″E	1998	1	4.0	4	
Hasle	55°10′13″N 14°43′24″E	1980	2	20.0	7	
Nexø	55°3′47″N 15°6′57″E	1981	2	20.0	6	
Olsker	55°13′55″N 14°47′44″E	1959	2	8.0	6	
Østerlars	55°9′12″N 14°56′6″E	1974	1	6.3	4	
Poulsker	55°1′20″N 15°3′21″E	1990	1	10.0	5	
Rønne Nord	55°6′40″N 14°42′28″E	1989	1	10.0	6	
Rønne Power Station	55°6′40″N 14°42′28″E		2	41.0	9	
Rønne Syd	55°5′23″N 14°43′50″E	1983	1	10.0	4	
Snorrebakken	55°6′42″N 14°44′40″E	1977	1	10.0	6	
Snorrebakken	55°6′24″N 14°44′19″E		0	0	0	Cable terminal, no transformers
Svaneke	55°8′5″N 15°8′10″E	1988	1	10.0	6	
Vesthavnen	55°6′10″N 14°41′26″E	1994	1	10.0	4	
Viadukten	55°5′52″N 14°42′50″E	1988	1	10.0	7	

Location map
