= Sankt Ols Kirke =

Church in Bornholm, Denmark

Coordinates: 55°14′10″N 14°48′02″E

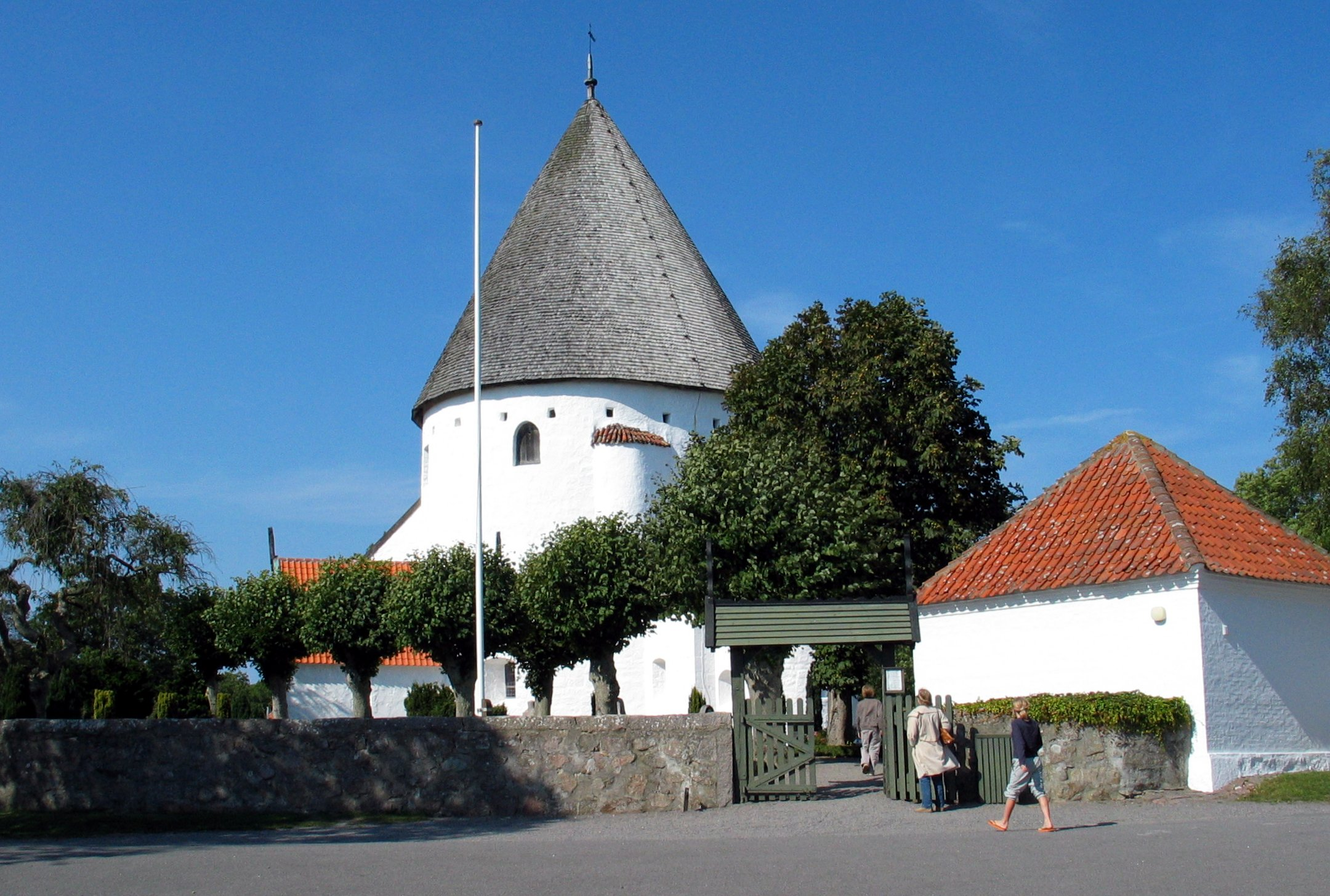
Sankt Ols Kirke, Bornholm

Sankt Ols Kirke (St Olaf's Church), also known as Olsker Church, is a 12th-century round church located in the village of Olsker, 4 km (2.5 mi) south of Allinge on the Danish island of Bornholm. Built in the Romanesque style and reaching three storeys high, it has from the beginning consisted of a round nave, a choir and an apse.

== History ==
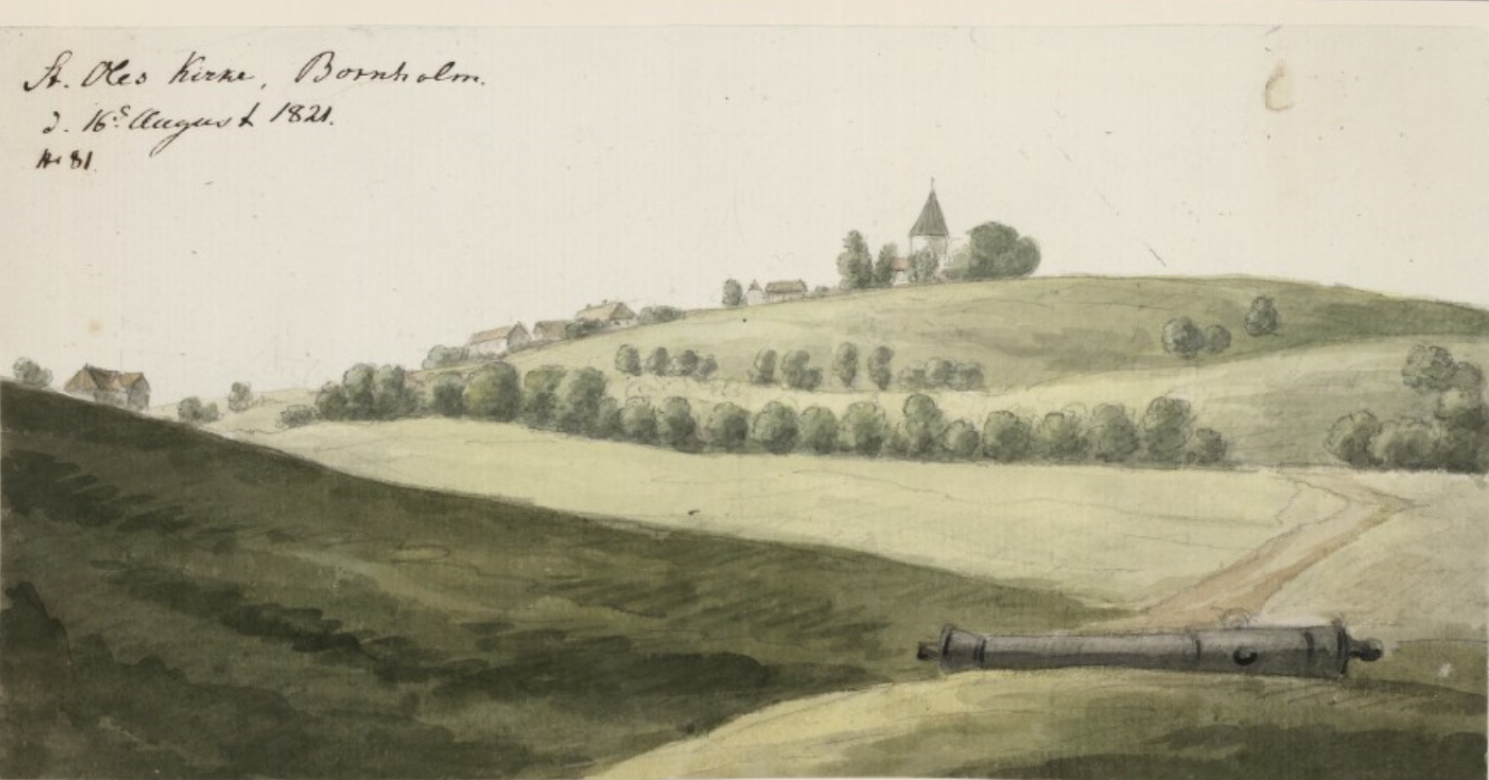
Ole Jørgen Rawert: St. Ole's Church, 16 August 1821

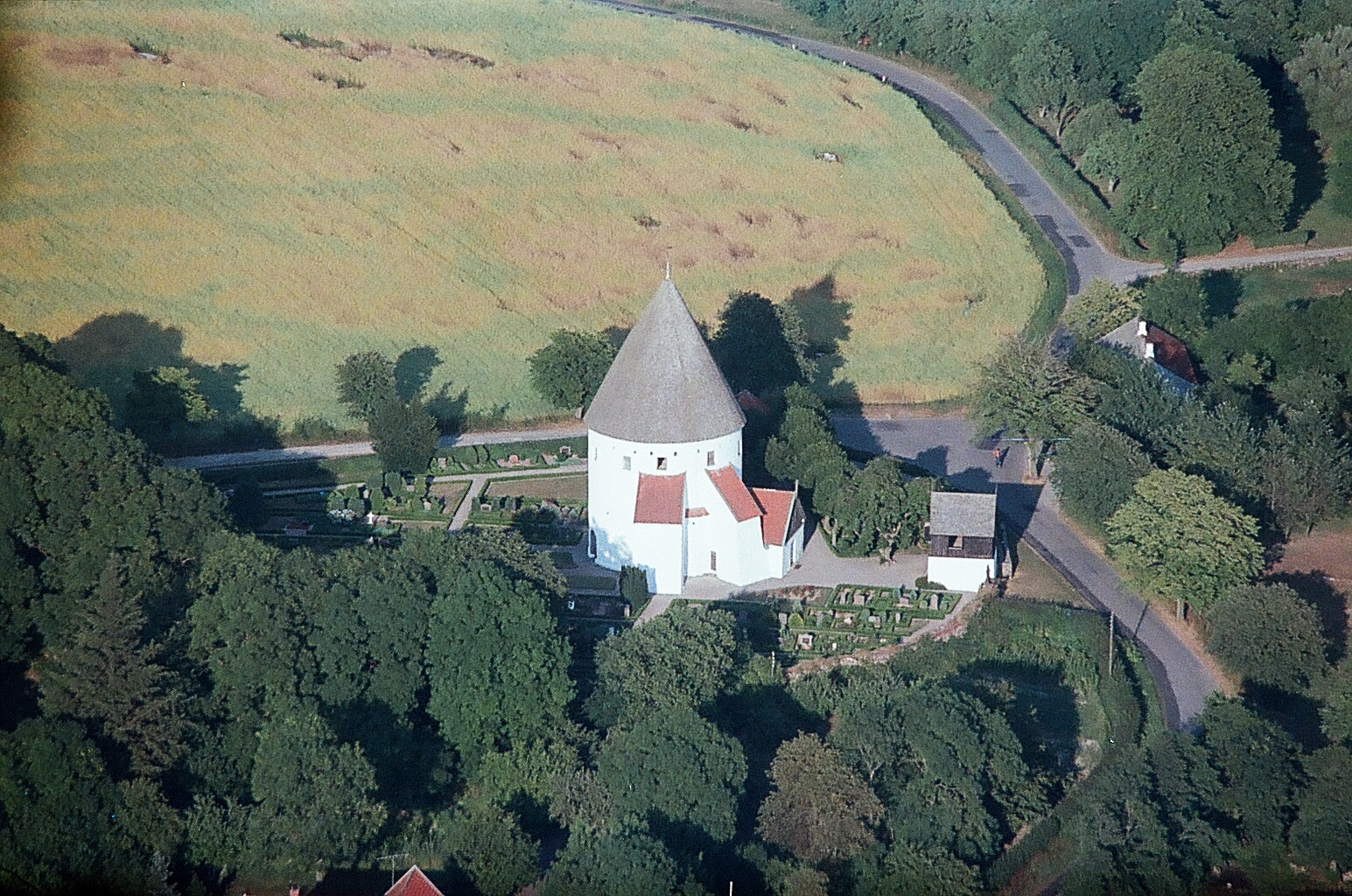
Aerial view, St. Ole's Church, 1982

Like Bornholm's other medieval churches, Sankt Ols was built in the 12th century. It was named after the revered King Olaf II of Norway who fell at the Battle of Stiklestad in 1030. In 1378, it was documented as "Ecclesia sancti Olaui" (Church of St Olaf). The church first belonged to the Archbishopric of Lund, then came under the Danish crown at the time of the Reformation. In the 19th century, it became fully independent.

== Architecture ==
The highest of Bornholm's four round churches, rising 13 metres from its base to the top of the conical roof, the church is built of local granite fieldstone with limestone door frames. Standing on a hilltop at a height of 112 metres above sealevel, it was built as a stronghold to defend the surrounding area. The openings in the wall on the upper storey were designed for shooting or throwing stones at the enemy. There was also a platform with a parapet which was used for defensive purposes. The church was also equipped with a hanging gallery, supported on beams projecting from the walls of the round tower.

The structure consists of a barrel vault and a central column bearing the upper floors. The height of the cylindrical nave, 13 metres, is almost exactly the same as that of Østerlars Church. There are small extensions from the nave into the small choir and tiny apse. The central column provides solid support for the first two storeys but is more slender in the loft where it bears the more recent roofing. The porch is probably medieval while the two buttresses to the west were added in 1825 to guard against collapse. The bell tower dates from the end of the 18th century. Restoration work was carried out in 2004 by Nils-Holger Larsen.

== Interior ==
During restoration work in 1911 and 1950–52, frescos were discovered in the nave and choir from at least three different periods, the oldest from the 14th century. They were however in very poor condition, especially in the nave. The early Renaissance pulpit dates from the first half of the 16th century. In the 18th century, it was decorated with paintings of the evangelists and angels. The fairly recent oak gallery is unpainted. The new organ was built by Axel Starup.

== Bornholm's round churches ==
Bornholm is known for its four round churches built in the 12th and 13th centuries The other round churches on Bornholm are Nyker Church, Nylars Church and Østerlars Church. They are all architecturally impressive buildings with a number of common features.

== Gallery ==
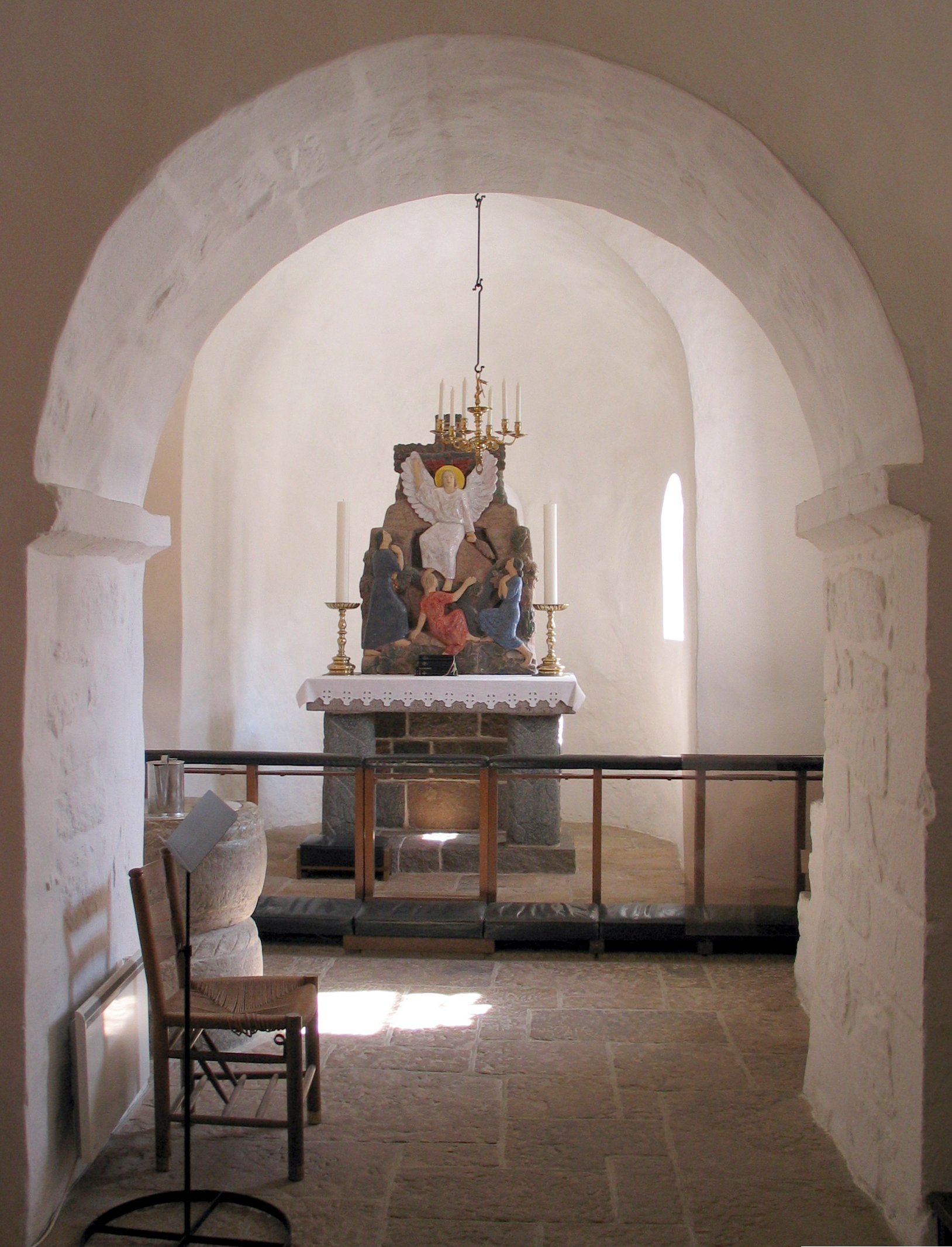
Choir and apse

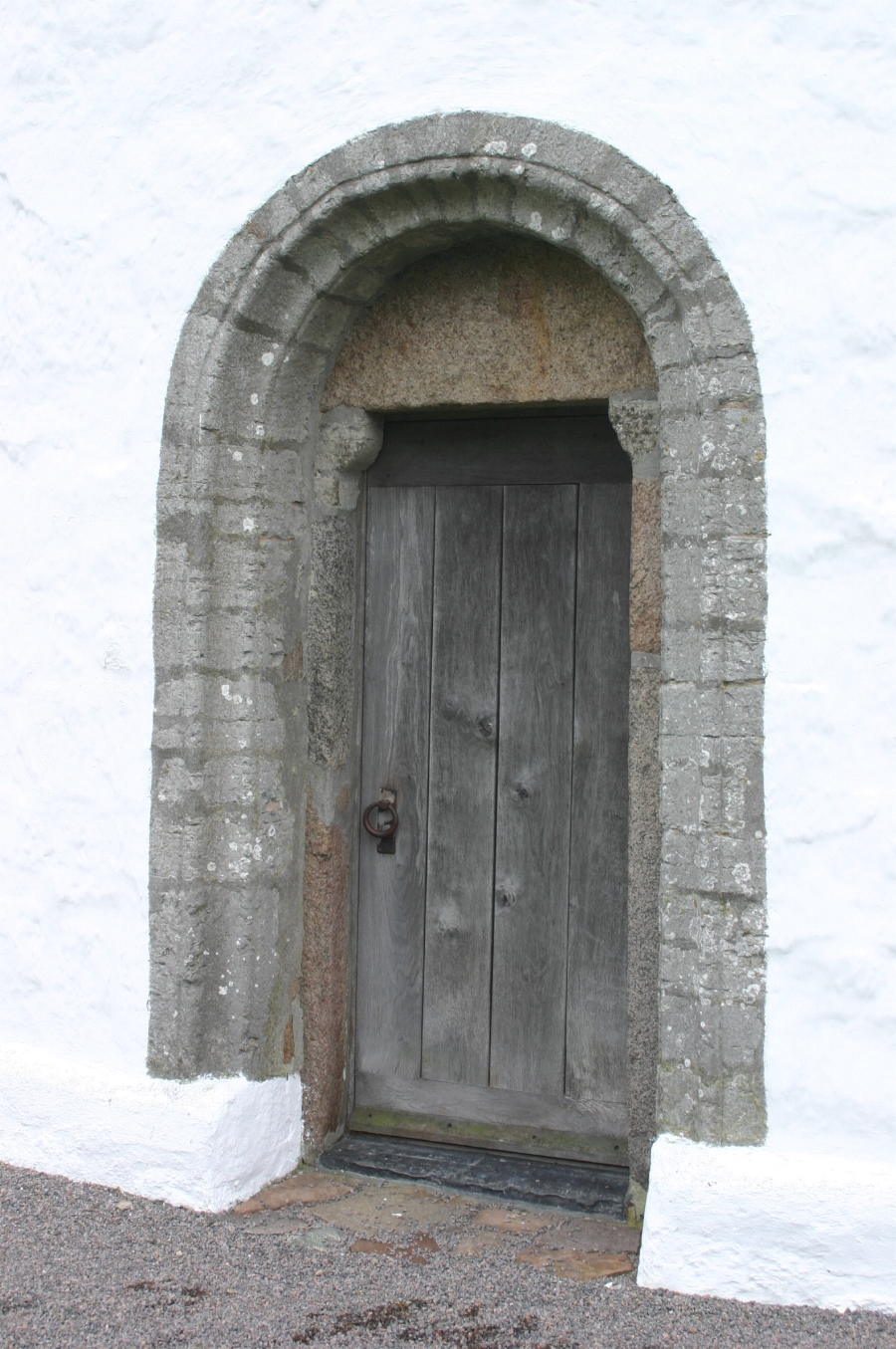
Romanesque door

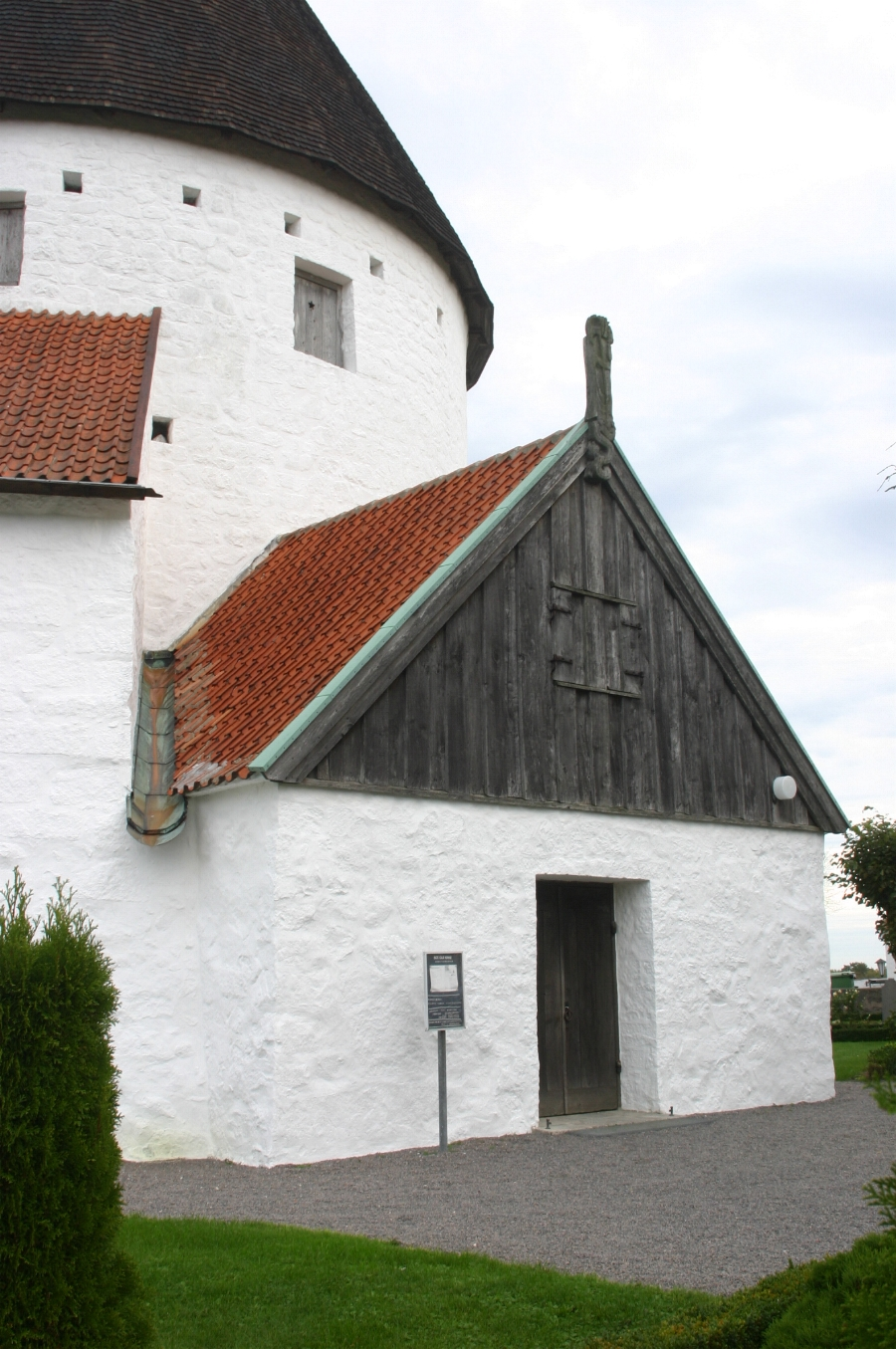
Porch

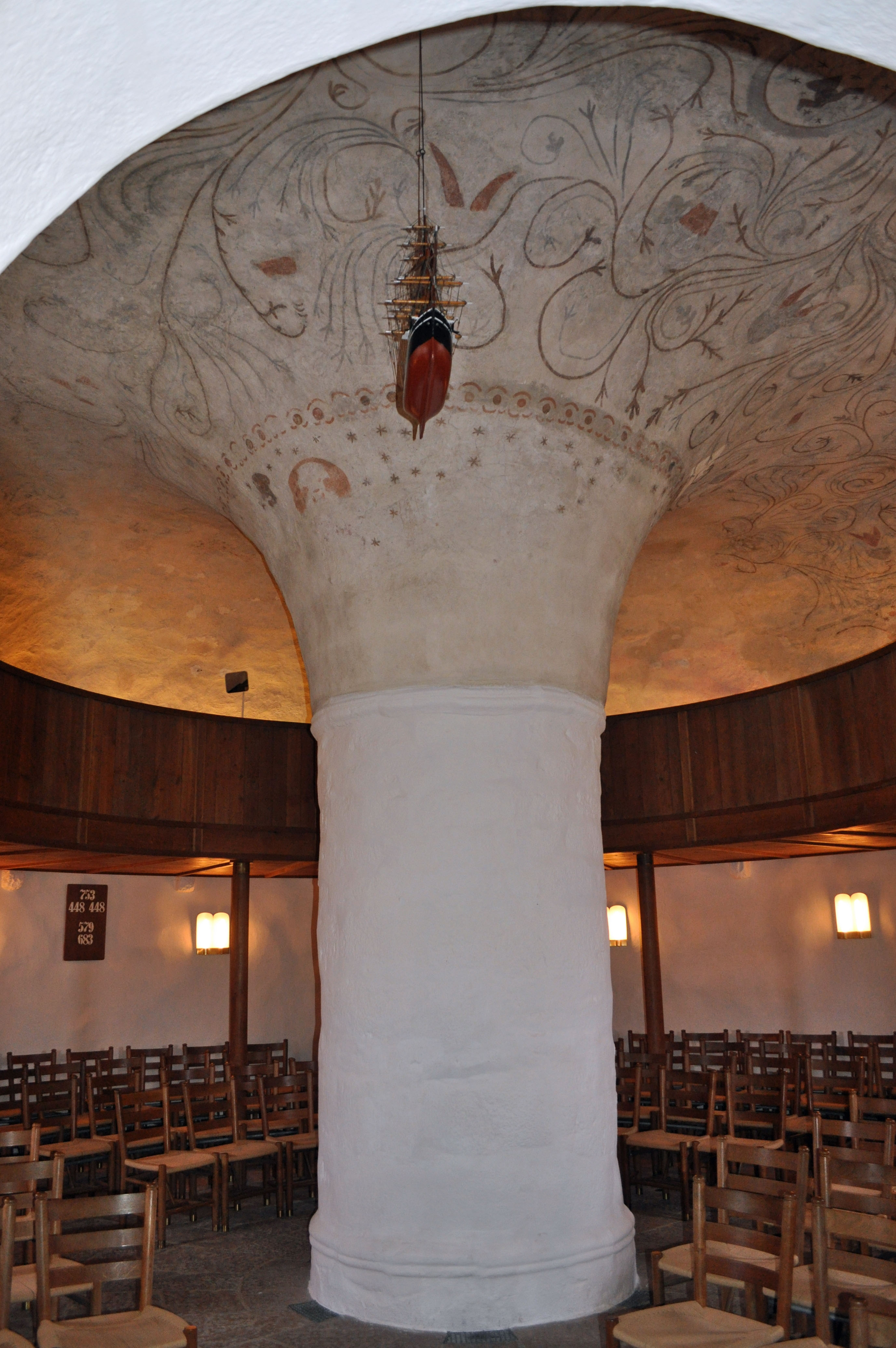
Frescos

== See also ==
- List of churches on Bornholm
