= Bornholms Middelaldercenter =

Open air museum in Bornholm, Denmark

Coordinates: 55°10′31″N 14°57′24″E

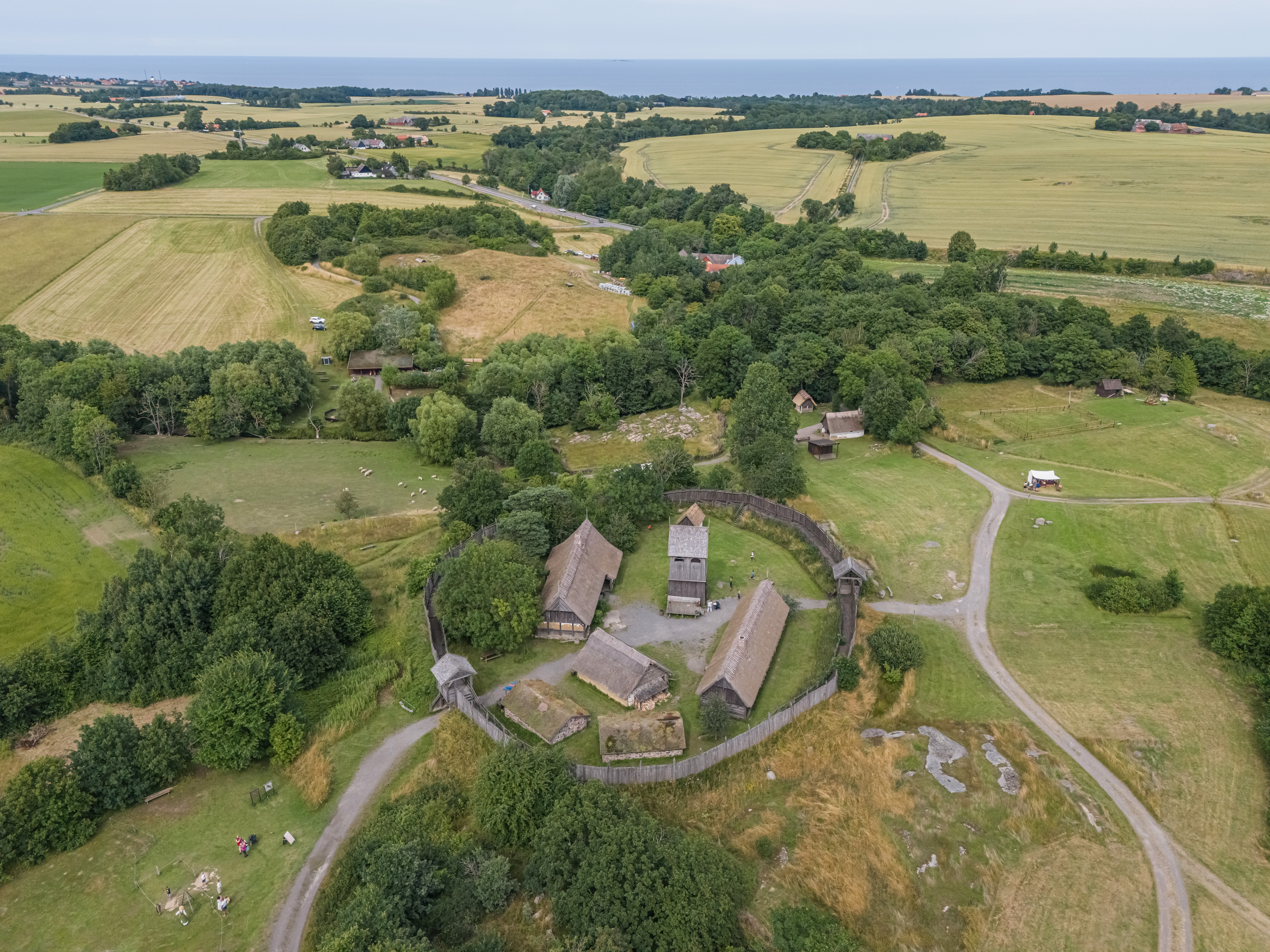
An aerial image of Bornholms Middelaldercenter

Bornholms Middelaldercenter (Bornholm's Medieval Centre) is a family attraction near Østerlars in northeastern Bornholm, Denmark.

== Layout ==
On 14 hectares (35 acres) of land just to the north of the village of Østerlars, the centre offers impressions of the Middle Ages, presenting daily life in a rural environment from around 1350 to 1450. It includes a watermill for producing flour, a forge, an archery range and old cottages. There is also a large fortress with battlements, towers and a chapel. Visitors can experience craftsmen at work and can participate in activities. During the annual medieval week, there are special events including jousting, battles and falconry.

The centre is open on Monday to Friday from May to September. In July it is also open on Saturday.

== See also ==
- Middelaldercentret - a similar museum just outside Nykøbing Falster
