= Olsker =

- Village
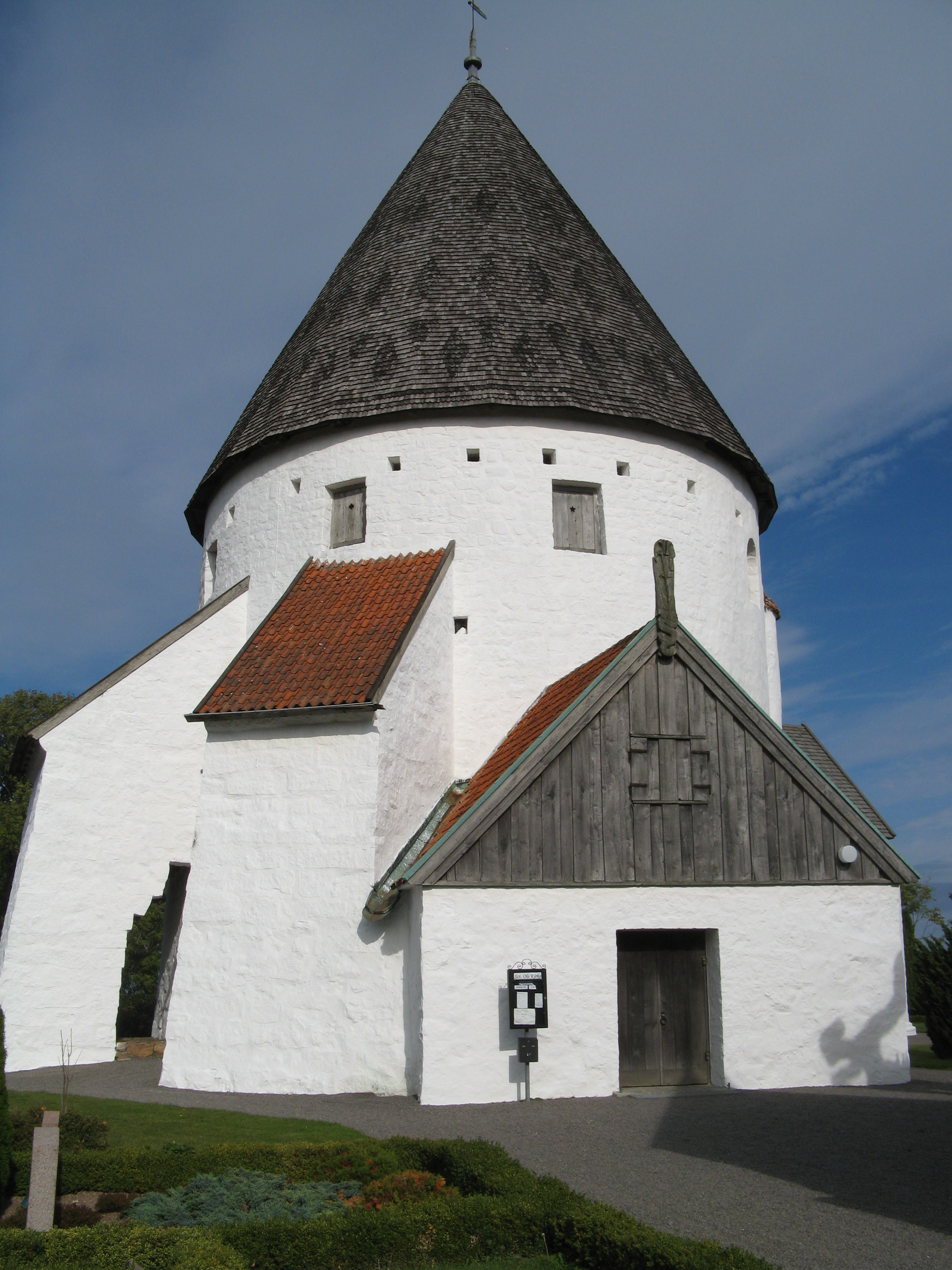
- Sankt Ols Kirke in Olsker.

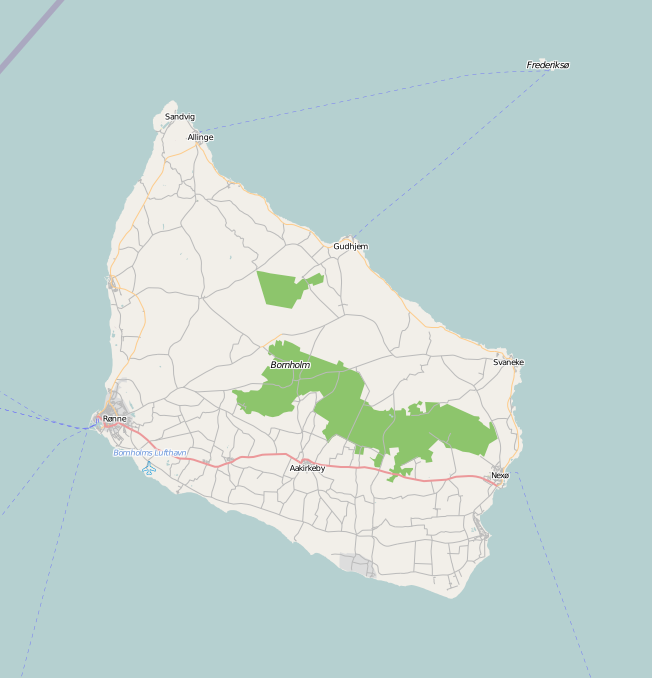
- Location on Bornholm
- Coordinates: 55°14′26″N 14°47′50″E
- Country: Denmark
- Region: Capital (Hovedstaden)
- Municipality: Bornholm

Population (2009)
  - Total: 67
- Time zone: UTC+1 (CET)
  - Summer (DST): UTC+2 (CEST)

Olsker is a small community in the north of Bornholm island, Denmark. It is situated in Olsker parish, some 3.5 km south of Allinge and 2.5 km from Tejn. As of 2009, it has 67 inhabitants. It is known for having the highest of the island's four round churches, Sankt Ols Kirke, from which it takes its name. Olsker also has Bornholm Cable substation. Views from Olsker include that of the Baltic Sea, Christianso island, and two other islands.

== History ==
Olsker Church is a Romanesque round church dating back to 1200. It stands alone on a hilltop and can be seen from miles around. It used to serve sailors as a landmark for navigation. To the east of the church, evidence of bronze-age and iron-age settlements have been found as well as living quarters from the Viking period. The village's old schoolhouse is also part of its heritage.
