= Østerlars Church =

Church building in Bornholm Regional Municipality, Denmark

Coordinates: 55.1714°N 14.9617°E

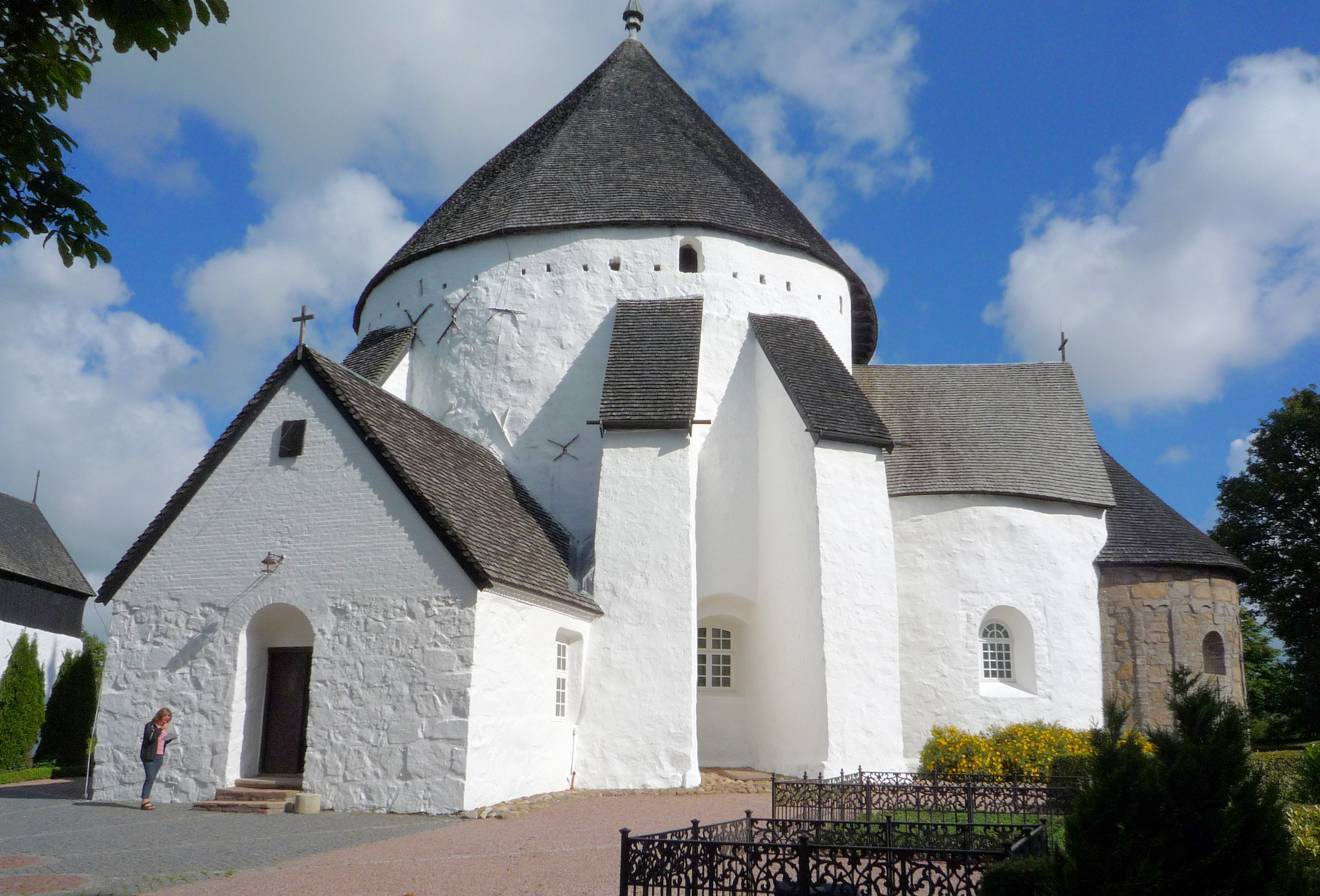
Østerlars Church

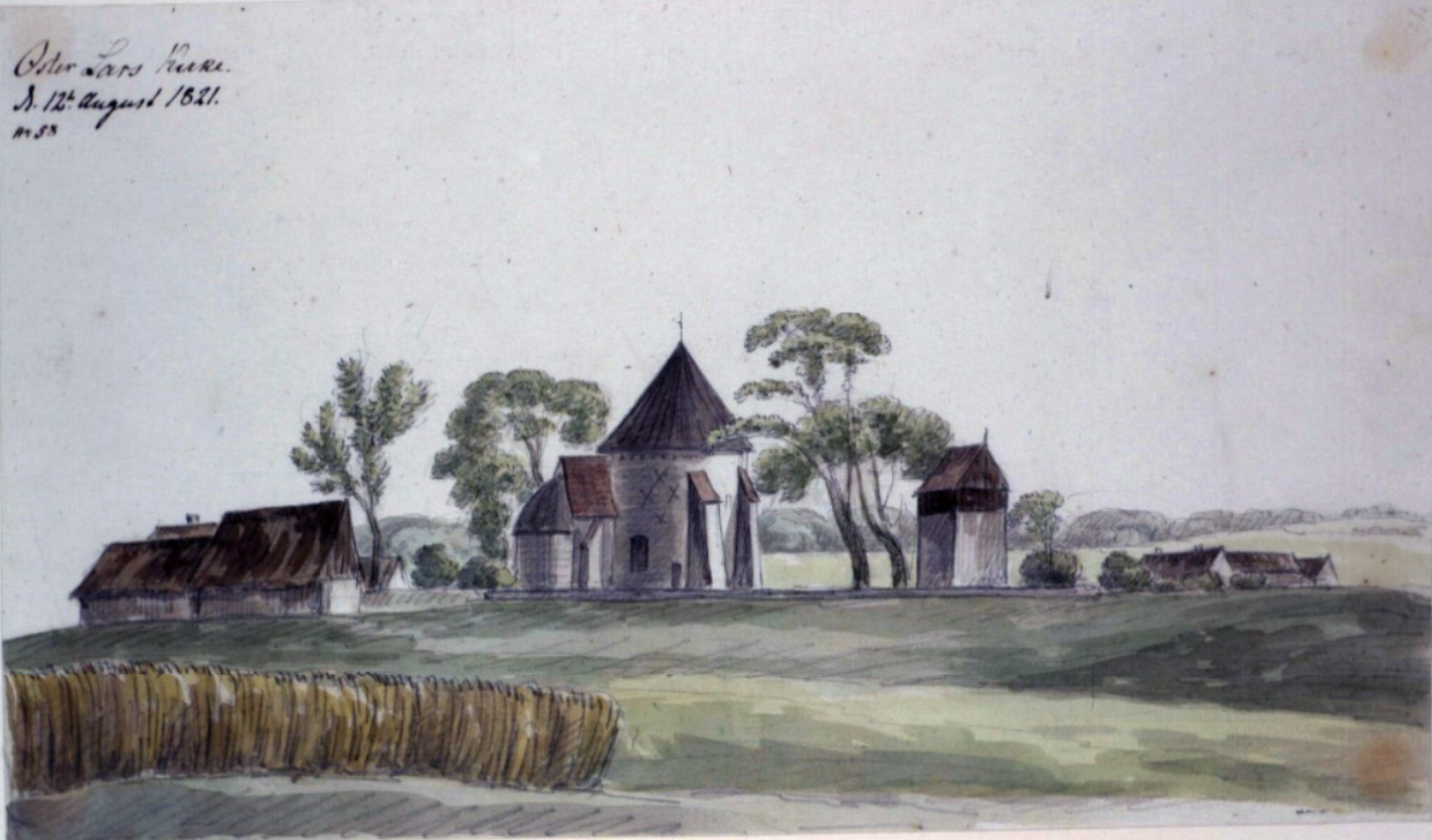
Ole Jørgen Rawert: Østerlars Church, 12 August 1821

Østerlars Church (Østerlars kirke) is a historic building located just north of the village of Østerlars, 5 kilometres (3.1 mi) south of Gudhjem on the island of Bornholm, Denmark. It is the largest and, possibly, the oldest of the island's four round churches.

== History ==
Built around 1160, it consists of an apse, an oval chancel, a large round nave and has three storeys. There is evidence the church was once fortified, the top storey serving as an open shooting gallery. The church is dedicated to St Lawrence (Latin: Laurentius, Danish: Lars). The building is one of Denmark's oldest Romanesque churches. On the basis of coins dated 1157 found in the floor, the date of construction was probably around 1160. The fieldstone wall stands on foundations of Bornholm limestone. The double-arched apse bears similarities to that in Lund Cathedral. The round nave has an external diameter of 16 meters. In its centre there is a large round hollow column, six meters wide. An opening leads into a small room, known as the oven, inside the column.

Originally there were small Romanesque windows but these were enlarged after the Reformation. During the 16th century, a number of buttresses were added to support the outer wall. The conical roof was replaced in the 17th century. The porch is from 1870.

The bell tower stands separately from the church in the churchyard; the tower was the original entrance and gate tower. There are two runestones, one inside the porch (c. 1100) and another outside (c.1070).

== Decorations and furnishings ==
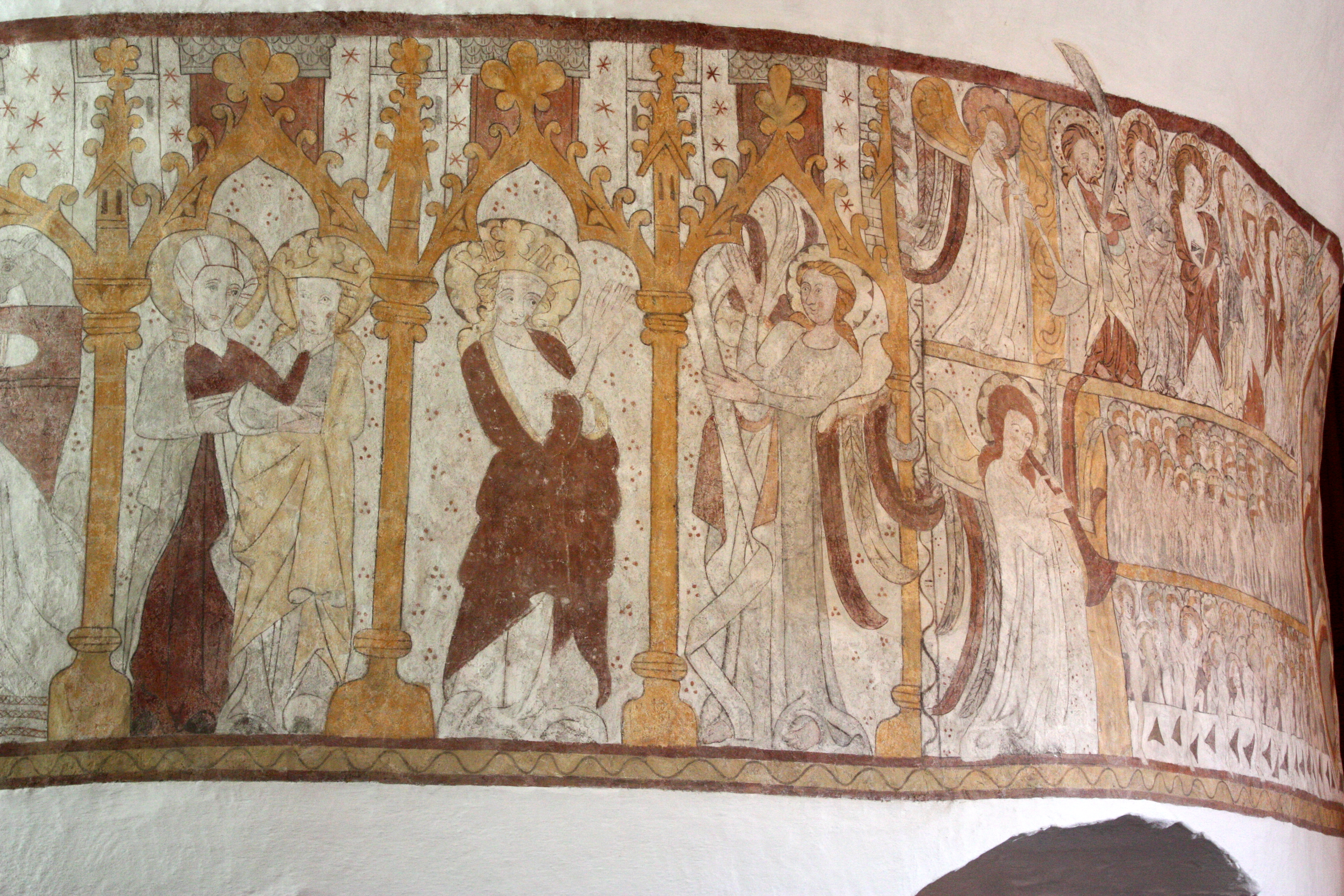
Frescos

The church's central column is decorated with frescos or kalkmalerier from 1350 showing biblical scenes from the Annunciation through to the Passion, ending with Day of Judgment where Jesus judges mankind. Many of the naked figures are sent to hell, symbolized by a huge dragon. They were probably painted some 140 years after the church was built. The frescos, which had been hidden with limewash since the Reformation, were uncovered in 1882. They were first restored by Jacob Kornerup in 1889, then in 1960 by G.M. Lind. In 2005, the National Museum of Denmark carried out further restoration work. The pulpit is from 1595. The carved altarpiece is from c. 1600.

== Bornholm's round churches ==
Bornholm is known for its four round churches built in the 12th and 13th centuries The other round churches on Bornholm are Nyker, Nylars and Olsker. They are all architecturally impressive buildings with a number of common features.

== Gallery ==
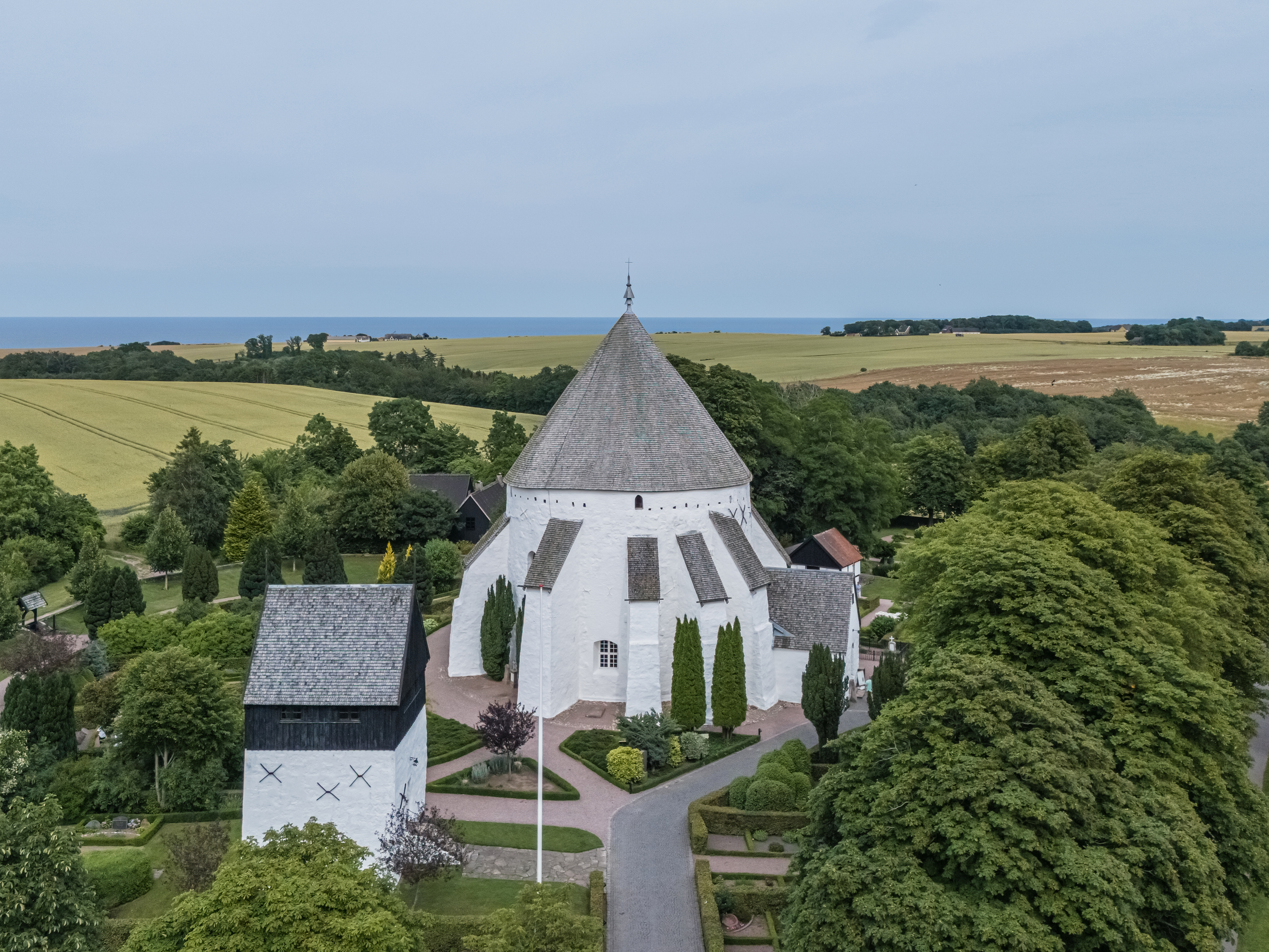
Aerial view of the freestanding tower and the church

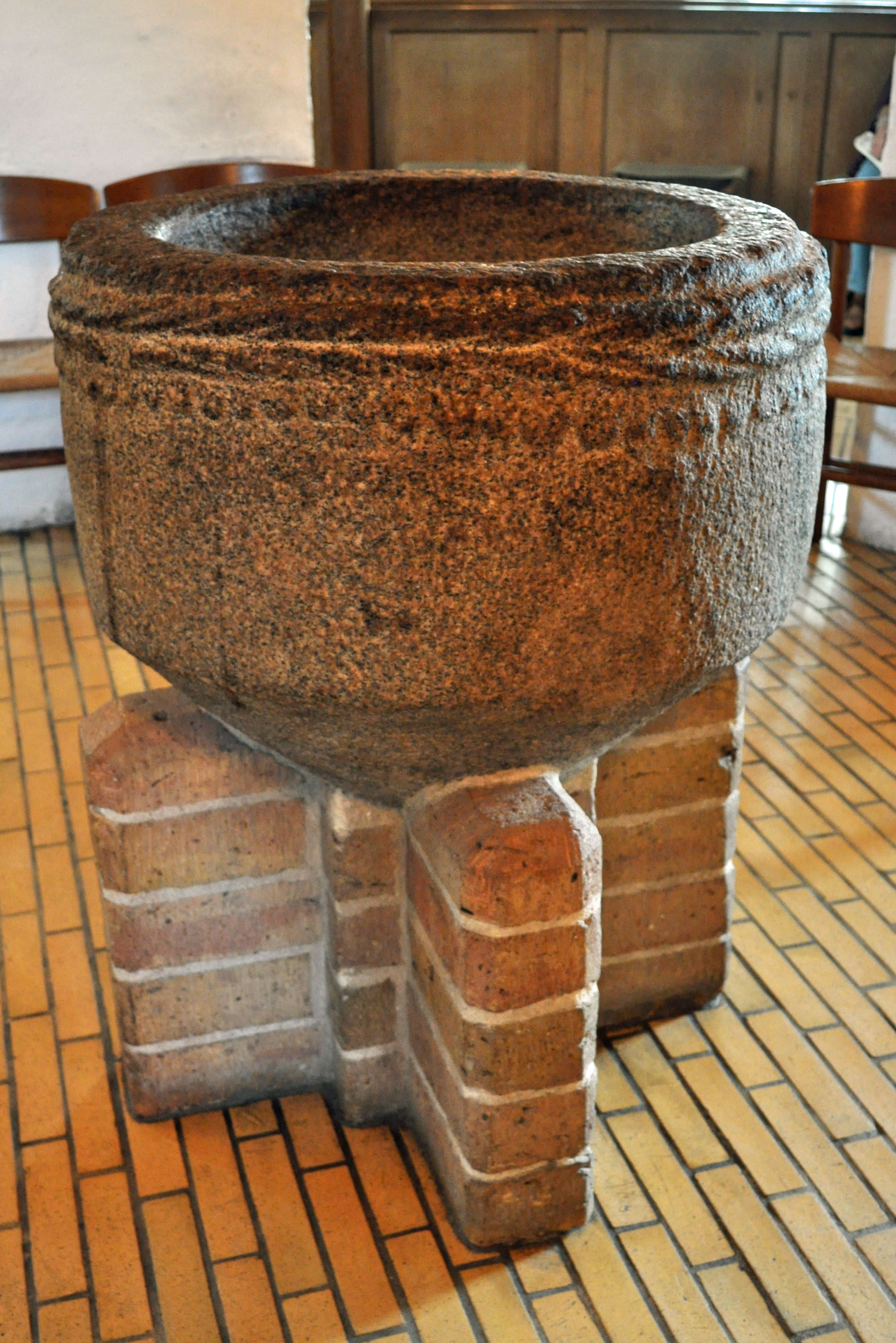
Baptismal

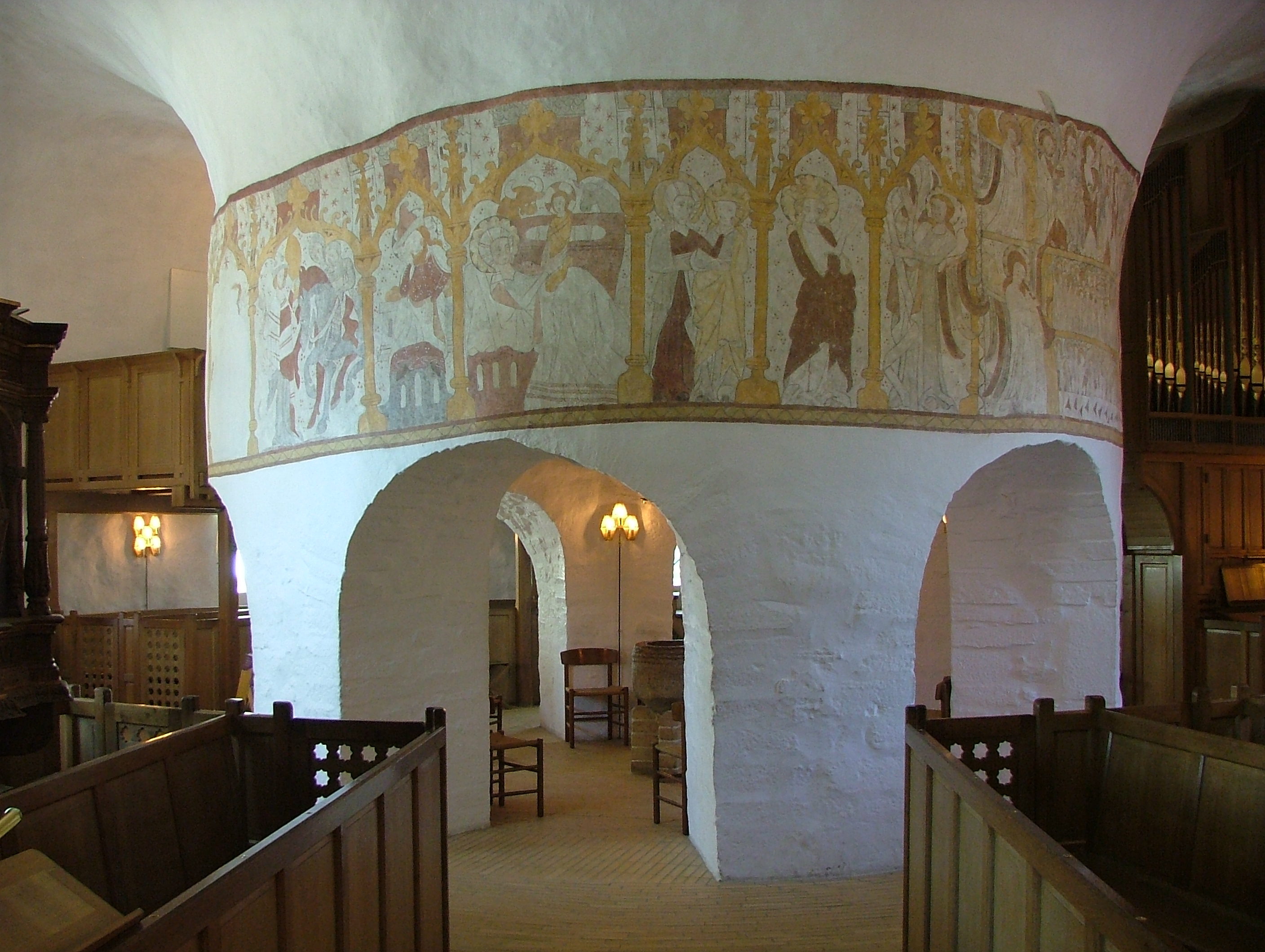
Central column with frescos

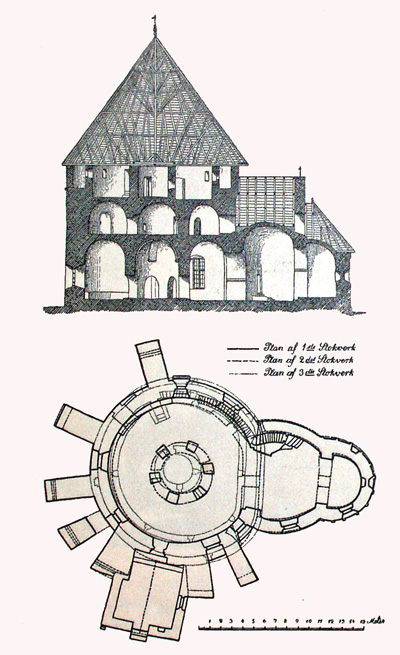
Ground plan and cross section

== See also ==
- Architecture of Denmark
- Church frescos in Denmark
- Rotunda (architecture)
- List of churches on Bornholm
