= Bornholm Cable =

Submarine AC power line between Sweden and Denmark

- Location of Bornholm Cable

Location
- Country: Sweden, Denmark
- Coordinates: 55°17′50″N 14°26′07″E

Ownership information
- Owner: Energinet

Technical information
- Capacity: 60 MW
- AC voltage: 60 kV

The Bornholm Cable is a submarine power cable under the Baltic Sea, connecting the power grid of the Danish island of Bornholm to the Swedish power grid owned by E.on with a capacity of 60 MW. It is owned by Energinet, previously by Östkraft.

There is an agreement between Svenska kraftnät and Energinet about balancing the Bornholm grid.

== Cable sections ==
The cable sections are:

- Hasle substation to Bornholm coast: 1.4 km underground, 400 mm^{2} conductors at 60 kV
- Undersea section: 43.5 km, 240 mm^{2} conductors at 60 kV
- Swedish coast to cable terminal: 700 m underground, 400 mm^{2} conductors at 60 kV
- Cable terminal to Borrby substation: 4.2 km overhead line with 127 mm^{2} conductors at 60 kV
- Borrby substation to Tomelilla substation: 132 kV line with two circuits

== Outages ==
The undersea section has been repeatedly damaged: in 2004, in 2010 and in 2013. The damage in 2013 cost half a million Danish crowns per day, due to electricity price differences between Bornholm and southern Sweden and the costs of two ships waiting for calm weather to repair the cable.

Reserve generating capacity for when the cable is out of service is provided by coal power plants on Bornholm and by diesel generators to cover the start-up time of the coal plants. There is also a project using energy stored in electric vehicles as a backup supply for a period of hours.

In 2018, the cable was buried deeper in the seabed to prevent damage, but suffered failure due to a dragging ship anchor in early 2022.

== See also ==
- Electric power infrastructure on Bornholm
- List of high-voltage transmission links in Denmark
