= Østerlars =

- Village
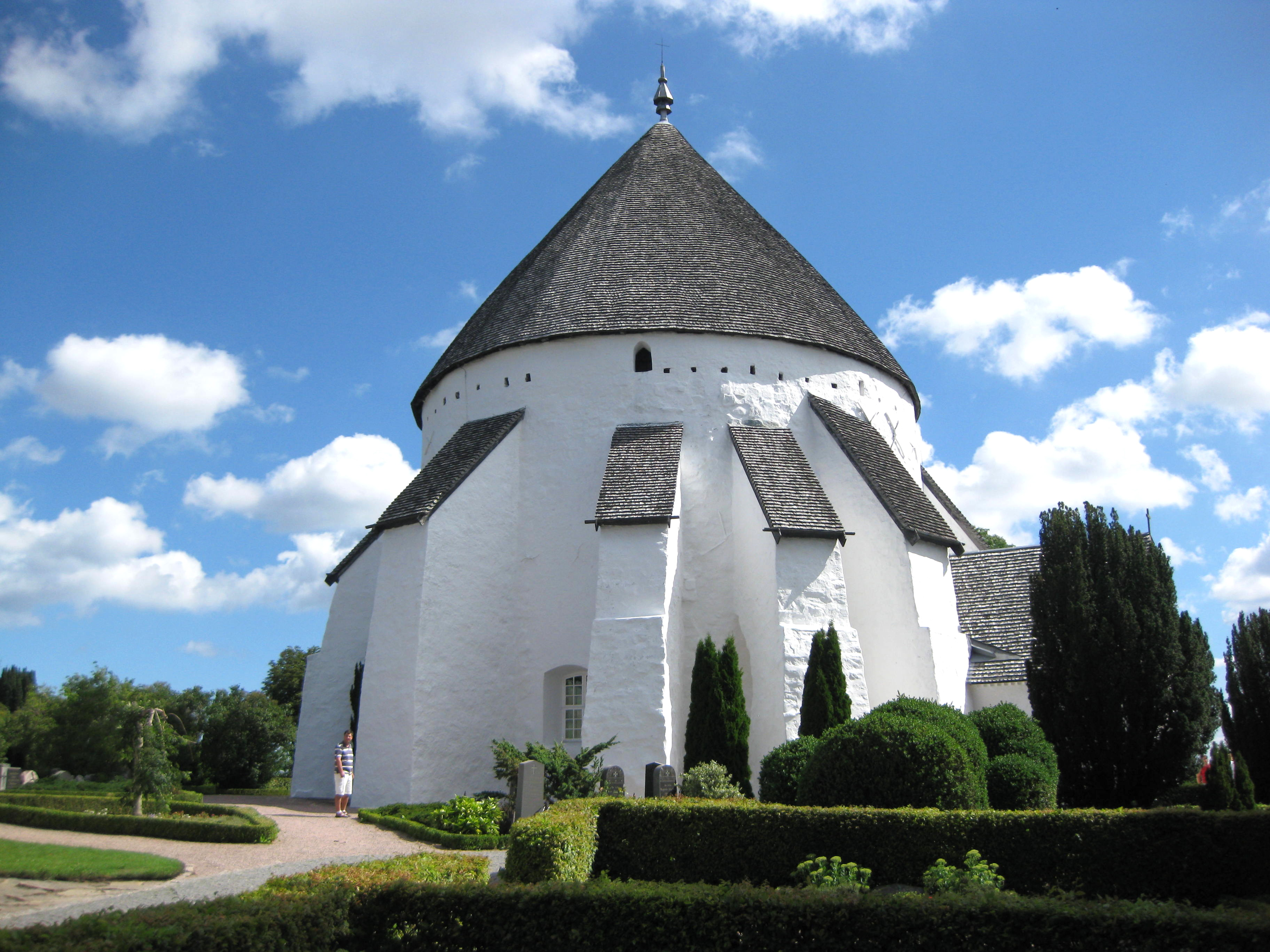
- Østerlars Church

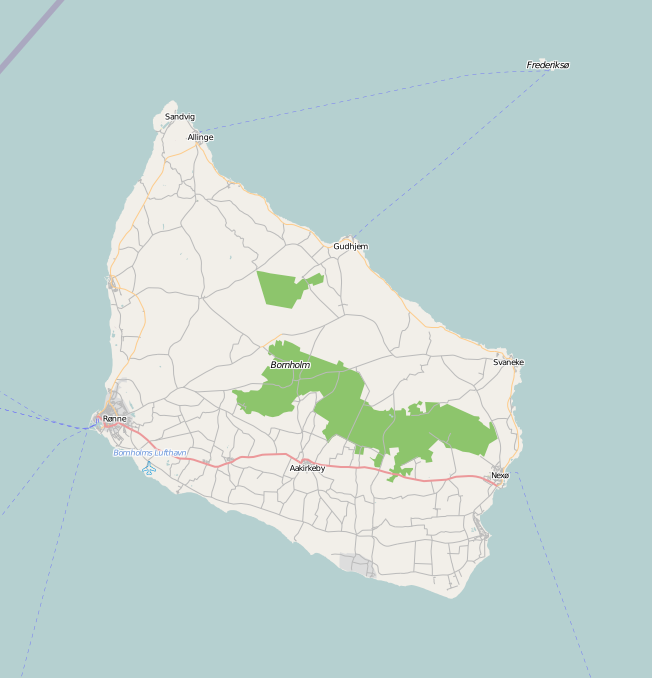
- Location on Bornholm
- Coordinates: 55°09′53″N 14°57′41″E
- Country: Denmark
- Region: Capital (Hovedstaden)
- Municipality: Bornholm

Population (2026)
  - Total: 262
- Time zone: UTC+1 (CET)
  - Summer (DST): UTC+2 (CEST)

Østerlars is a village in the northeast of the Danish island of Bornholm, 6 kilometres (3.7 mi) south of Gudhjem and 5 kilometres (3.1 mi) northwest of Østermarie. It is best known for its round church, the largest on the island. 1. January 2026 it had a population of 262.

== Etymology ==
The village takes its name from Østerlars Church which is dedicated to St Laurentius (St Lawrence). The Danish equivalent, Lars, was also the church's original name but around 1600 the prefix "øster" (eastern) was added to avoid confusion with nearby Nylars. Earlier names for the village were Østerlarsker (meaning Østerlars church) and Nybro (new bridge) as a result of the bridge over the stream known as Præstebækken which runs through the village.

== History ==
In the area of the farm buildings next to Østerlars Church, there are traces of buildings from the early Middle Ages. Rune stones and gravestones from the Middle Ages have also been found nearby. To the east of the village, Bækkegård and Rytterbakken have provided evidence of communities living during the Iron Age and the Viking period. At the top of the hill near Bækkegård, Bornholm's largest burial site has been found with over 220 graves from 525–850. Østerlars Church, built around 1160, is one of Denmark's oldest Romanesque churches. Today's village grew up around the railway station on the Aakirkeby–Gudhjem line which operated from 1916 to 1952. For a period, it had numerous facilities including a hotel, a bank, a post office, two butchers, a baker, a library and various agricultural interests but today there is only one food store. The old station building designed by Kay Fisker and Aage Rafn at No. 42 Nybrovej is now used as a school.

== The village today ==
Stretching some 1,200 metres (3,900 ft) on either side of the main road, the village is principally a residential area with two schools. It is one of the island's few villages where the population is expected to increase in the coming years. The church and Bornholm's Medieval Centre (Middelaldercenter), just north of the village, attract large numbers of tourists each year, especially in the summer months.

== See also ==
- Østerlars Church
