= St. Clement's Church, Bornholm =

Parish church in Klemensker on the Danish island of Bornholm

Coordinates: 55°10′27″N 14°48′24″E

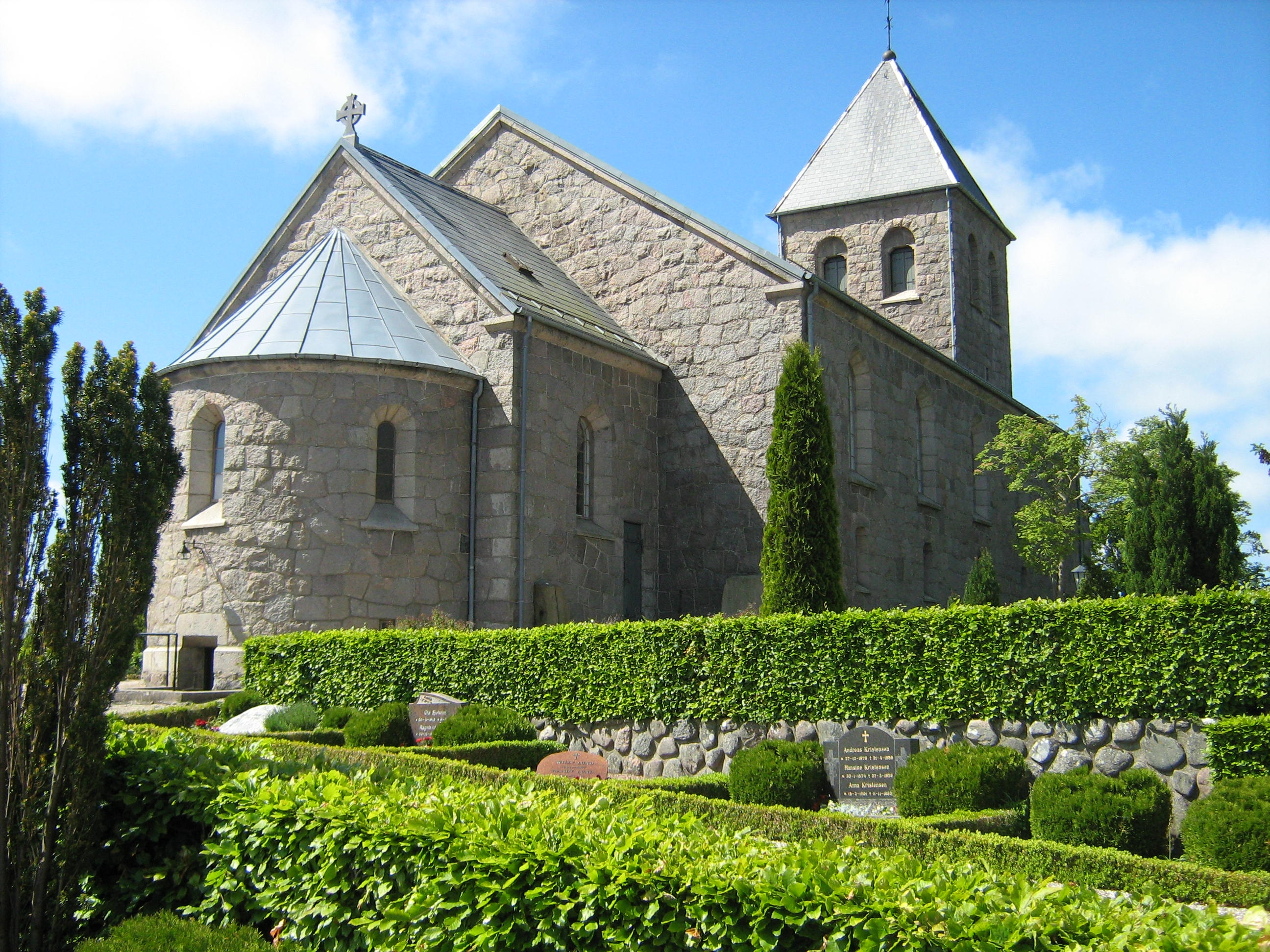
St. Clement's Church

St. Clement's Church (Danish: Klemens Kirke) is a parish church located in the village of Klemensker on the Danish island of Bornholm. Completed in 1882 in the Historicist style, it replaces an earlier Romanesque church from the 14th century or earlier. Today the church is noteworthy for works contributed by the Bornholm artist Paul Høm. A number of runestones have been found in the neighbourhood, two of which are now in the churchyard.

== History ==
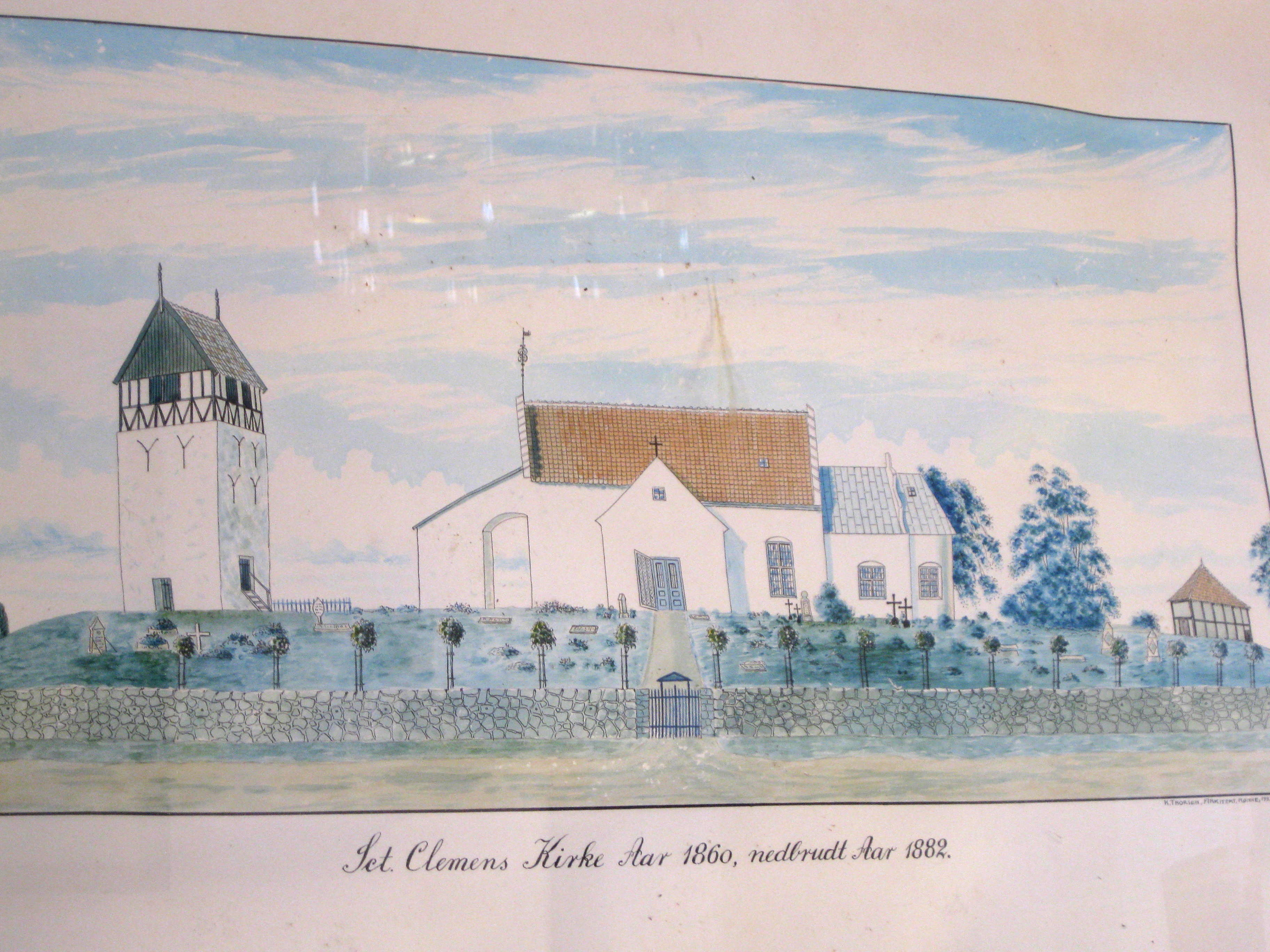
Painting of the former church

Today's church stands on a hilltop 114 meters above sea level which was also the site of an earlier, now demolished, Medieval church built in the Romanesque style. The old church was almost as long as the new building but only about half as wide. It appears to have been the only church on the island with star-shaped roof vaulting which probably replaced the original wooden ceiling around 1450. Many items of inventory from the old church can now be seen in the Bornholm Museum.

The church is named after St. Clement of Rome, Latin: Clemens Romanus, as documented in early references from 1335. While the name of St. Nicolas (Danish: Sankt Nicolai) was often chosen for churches associated with seafarers, the choice of St. Clement (also associated with the sea) indicates that the church was probably one of the earliest on Bornholm.

Like a number of Bornholm localities, the name of the village, Klemensker, is derived from that of its church, the suffix -ker denoting church in the local dialect.

== Architecture ==
Today's church is built of roughly hewn granite blocks while the windows and doors are framed in smoothly hewn elements. The building is 32 m long and 12 m wide. It was completed in December 1882 to a design by the Historicist architect Ludvig Knudsen based on the plans he used for St. Stephen's Church in Copenhagen which had been completed in 1874. Indeed, all the workmen were from Copenhagen despite the fact that the church should have been designed in the Romanesque style with features from the older churches on the island. With seating for congregations of around 1,000, it was initially said to have been one of the largest village churches in Denmark. It consists of an apsis, chancel and a long nave, terminating in a tower at the western end. Flanking the nave, there are large wooden galleries, supported by wooden pillars. The roof and the tower's four-sided spire are of slate.

The church's interior reflects the restoration carried out in 1960 under the leadership of Rolf Graae in collaboration with Paul Høm from nearby Gudhjem who contributed the church's colourful artwork. The pulpit is decorated with paintings of the four evangelists while a mosaic above the chancel arch depicts one of the oldest symbols of Christianity, the Paschal Lamb with the flag of victory and the chalice of blood. In 1974, the collaboration between Graae and Høm continued when they designed the facade for the new organ built by Bruno Christiansen and Sons from Jutland. Finally, in 1981 Høm completed the large paintings behind the altar: the dark-blues of Jesus' burial surmounted by the golden tones of the risen Christ.

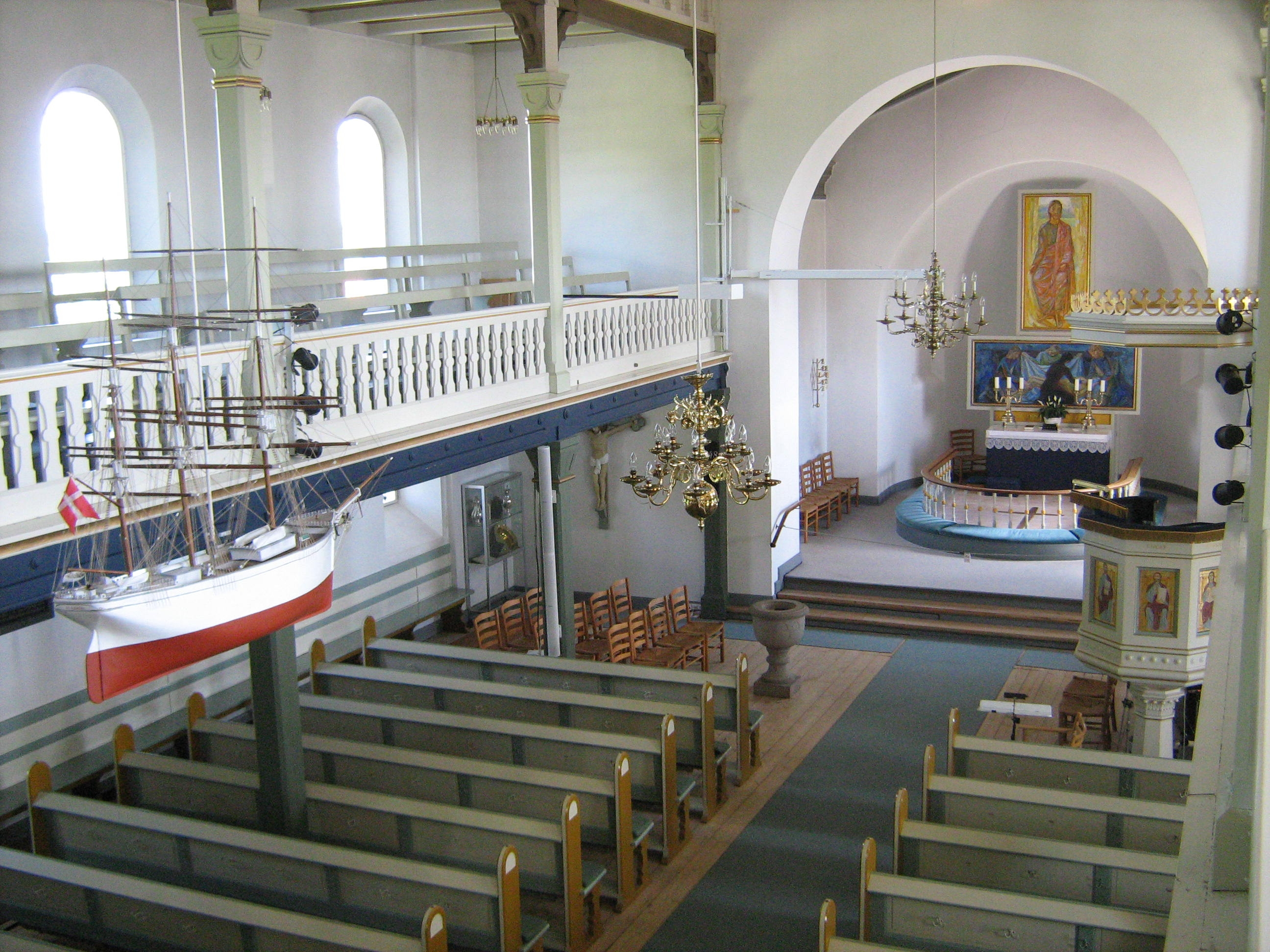
The nave, chancel and altar

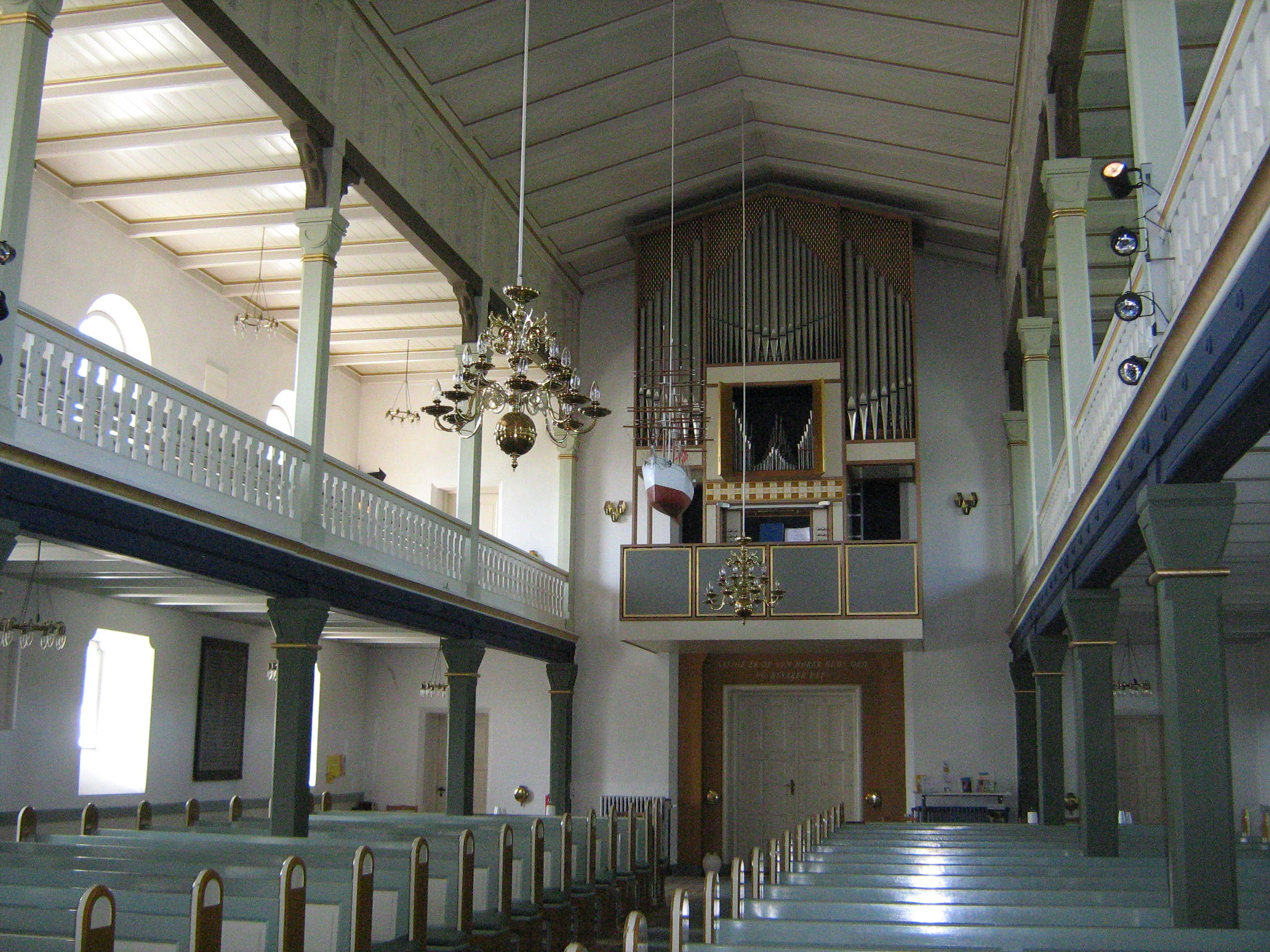
The church organ

== Runestones ==
Several runestones have been found in the vicinity. They probably date from the 11th century when a wooden church may have stood on the site. Now standing on the south side of the church, the Lundhøj Stone was found in 1819 being used as a bridge over a brook and is 2.74 meters tall. Designated as DR 399 in the Rundata catalogue, it bears an inscription which reads (when translated): "Gunild had this stone erected for Ødbjørn, her husband. Christ help Ødbørn's soul into light and paradise. Christ and St Michael help Ødbjørn's and Gunild's souls into light and paradise." On the same site, there are four broken pieces of stone designated as DR 404 with the inscription: "N.N. erected this stone for his brother Sven. God and God's mother (help) his soul ... kil carved these runes and Svenne." The Kuregård Stone, designated as DR 403 and named after the site of its discovery in 1856, on the north side of the chancel is inscribed: "Svend and Kæld erected the stone for their father Julger(?)." There are many other fragments of runestones bearing one or two words, some forming part of the churchyard wall.

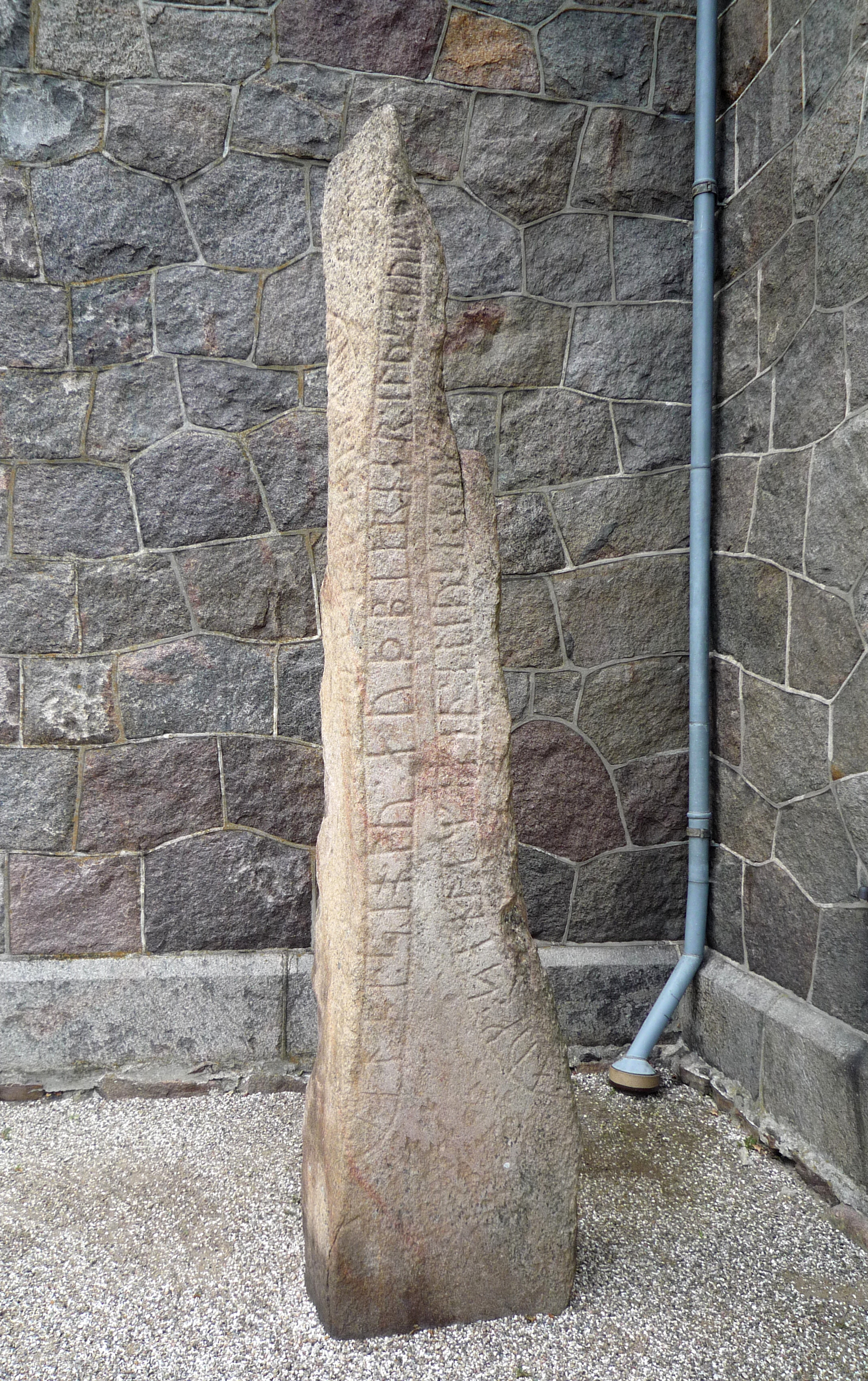
The Lundhøj Stone (DR 399)

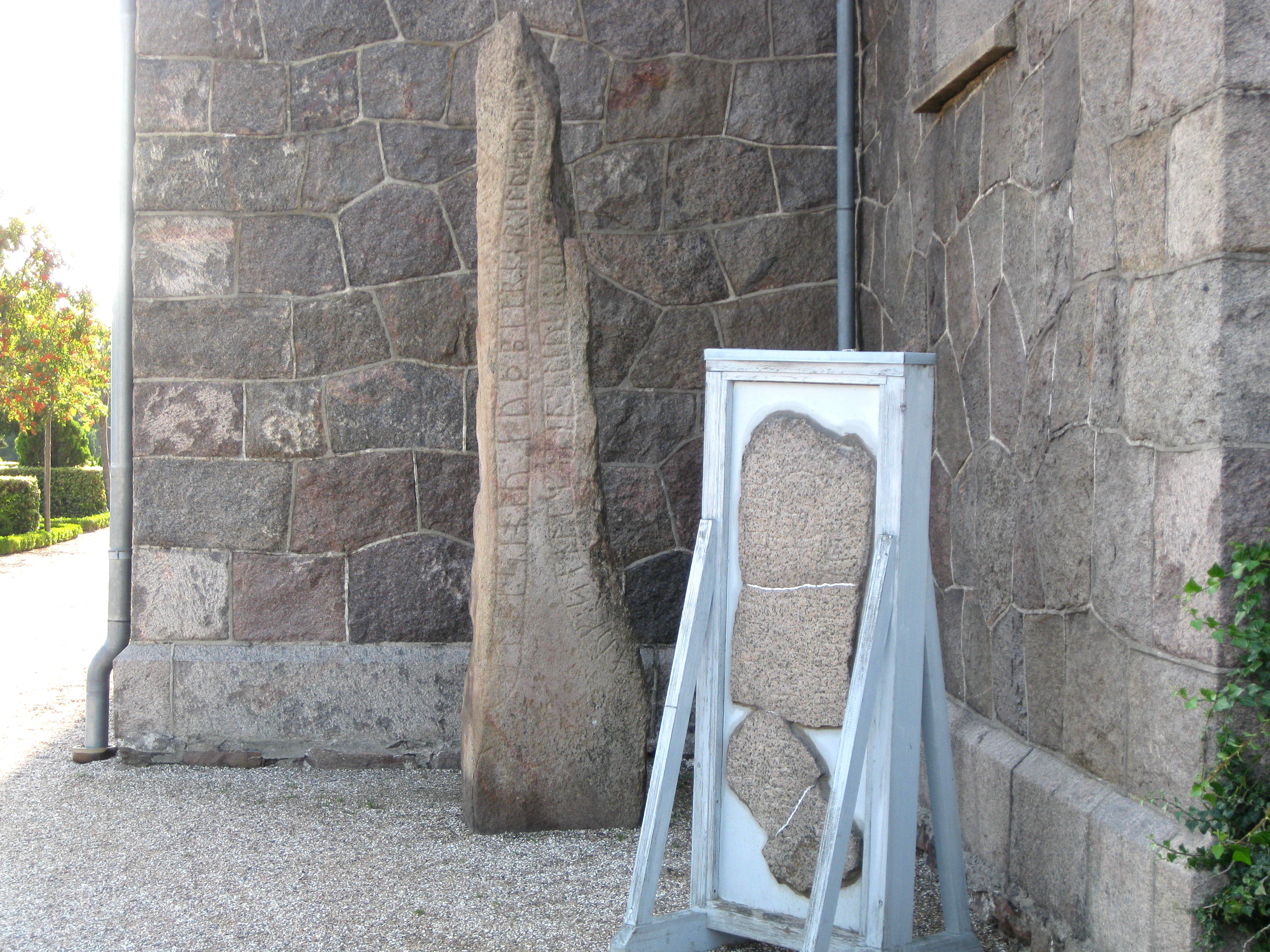
Runestones along the south wall of the chancel

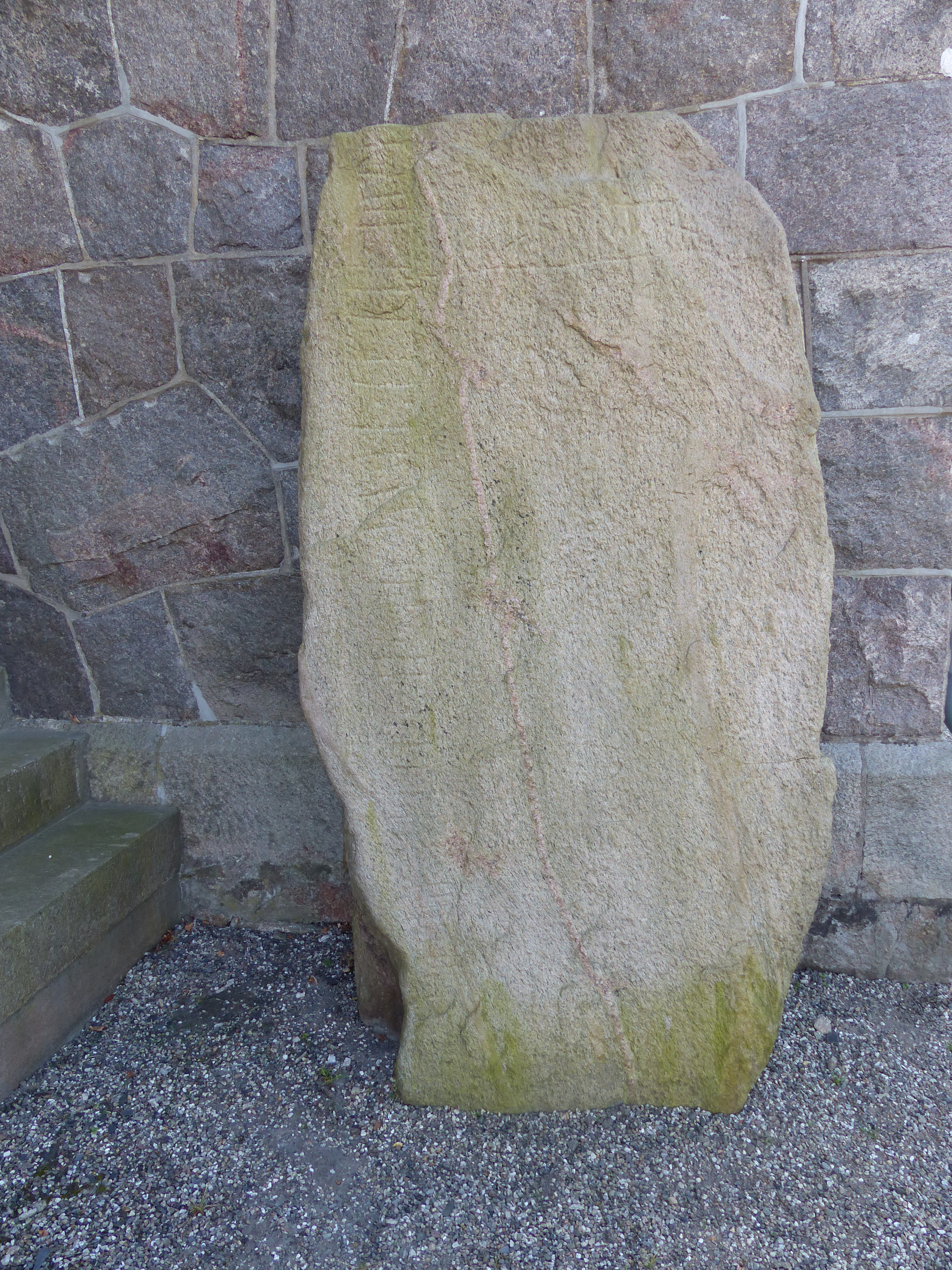
DR 403

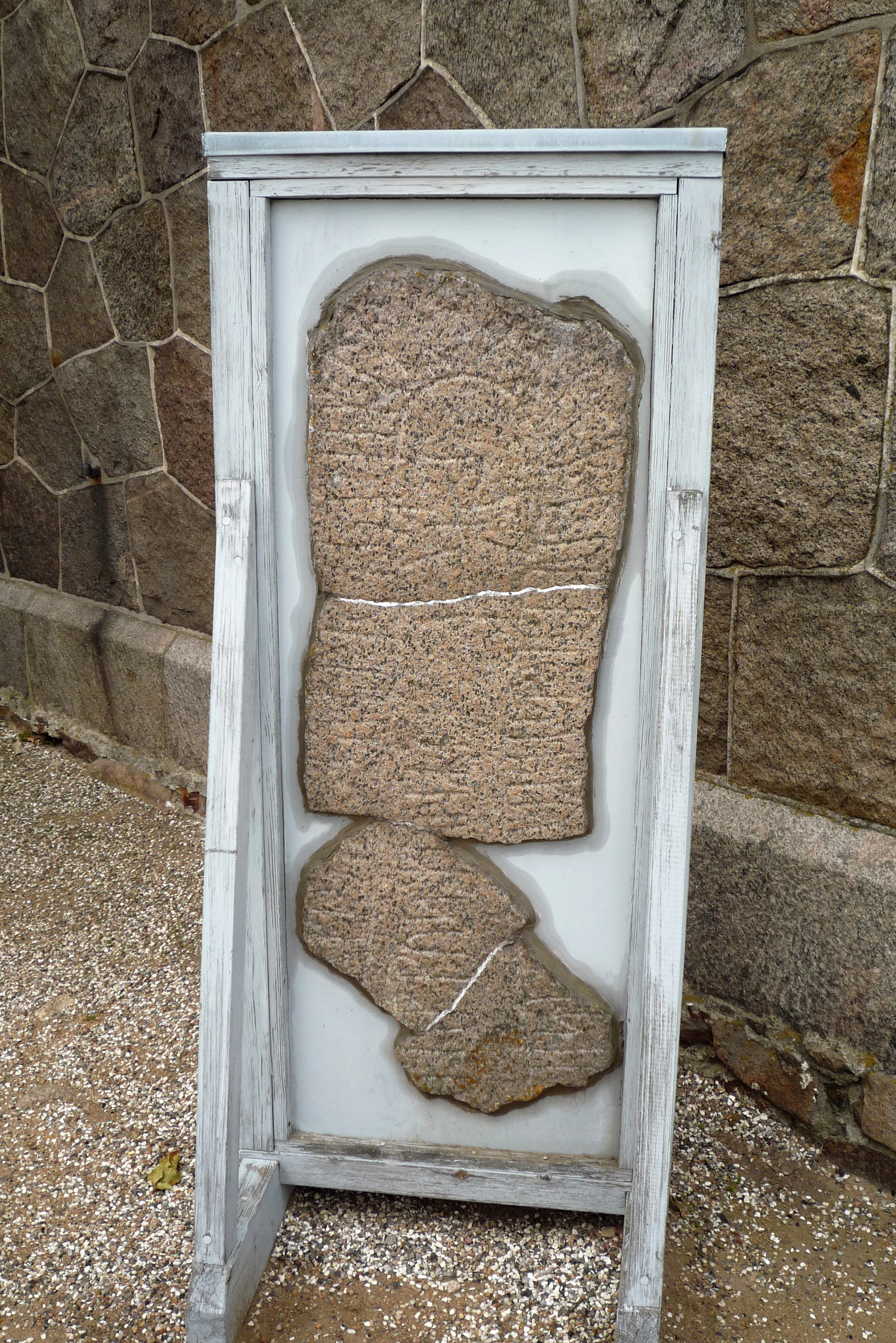
The four broken segments (DR 404)

== See also ==
- List of churches on Bornholm

== Bibliography ==
- Otto Norn, C. G. Schultz, Erik Skov, "S. Clemens Kirke: Bornholms Nørre Herred", Danmarks Kirker, Bornholm, Nationalmuseet, Gad, 1954, pp. 275–296. (in Danish)

== External runestone descriptions ==
The following sites on runic inscriptions are from the Nordisk Forskningsinstitut:

- Lundhøj Stone
- Broken stone
- Kuregård Stone
