= Istedgade =

Street in Copenhagen Municipality, Denmark

- Strassen
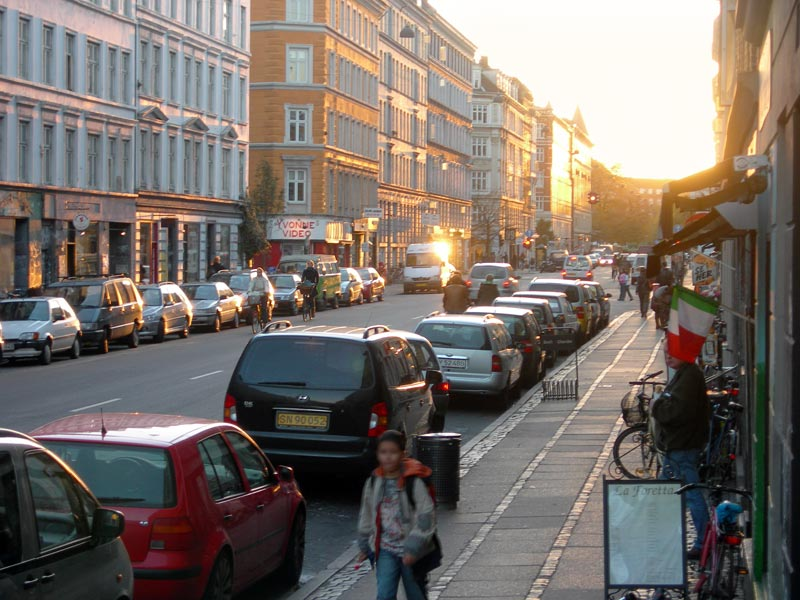
- Istedgade seen from number 98, looking west.
- Interactive map of Istedgade
- Namesake: Battle of Isted
- Length: 1 km (0.62 mi)
- Location: Vesterbro, Copenhagen, Denmark
- Coordinates: 55°40′10.33″N 12°33′16.34″E
- From: Copenhagen Central Station
- To: Enghave Plads and Enghaveparken

Construction
- Construction start: 1858

Other
- Known for: Shopping and entertainment

Istedgade (also called Strassen) is a 1-kilometer straight street in the district of Vesterbro in the Danish capital, Copenhagen. It starts at Copenhagen Central Station and runs parallel to Vesterbrogade to Enghave Plads and Enghaveparken. From the station in the cheap hotel district, it runs through the porn, prostitution and drugs area to modern Vesterbro, where 1900s tenement style blocks have undergone significant modernisation. It is generally considered the heart of Vesterbro, and was a main traffic artery until 2013 where the street had traffic reducing measures installed.

== History ==
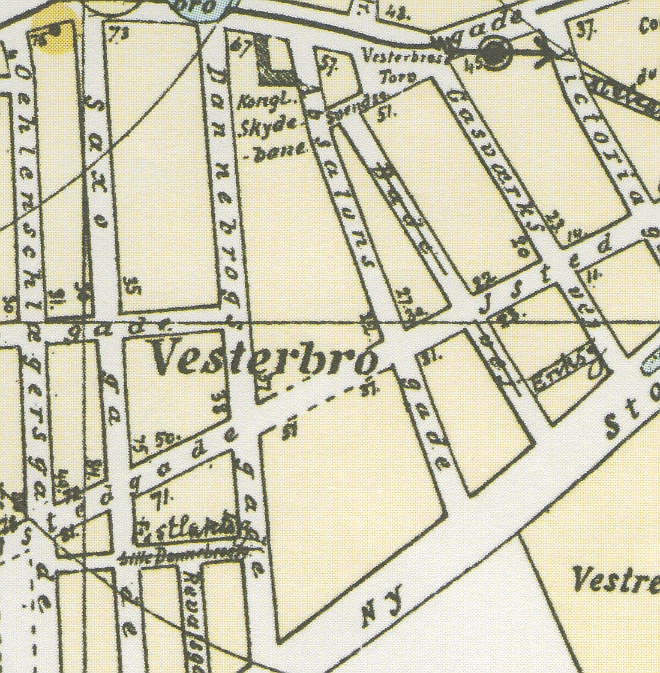
A map detail from 1886 which shows the two halves of Istedgade which had not yet been connected at the Royal Copenhagen Shooting Society's shooting range

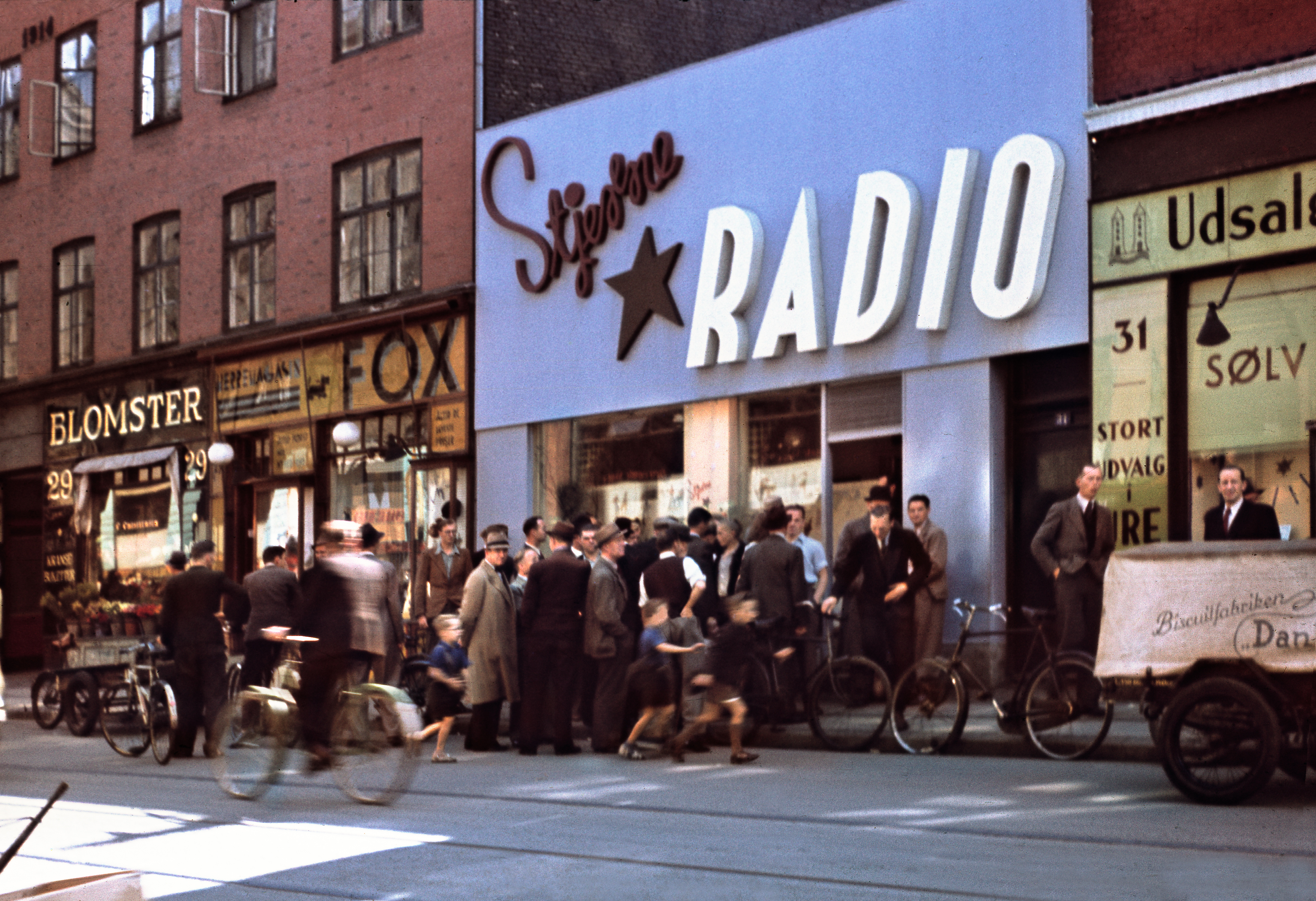
Stjerne Radio Museum

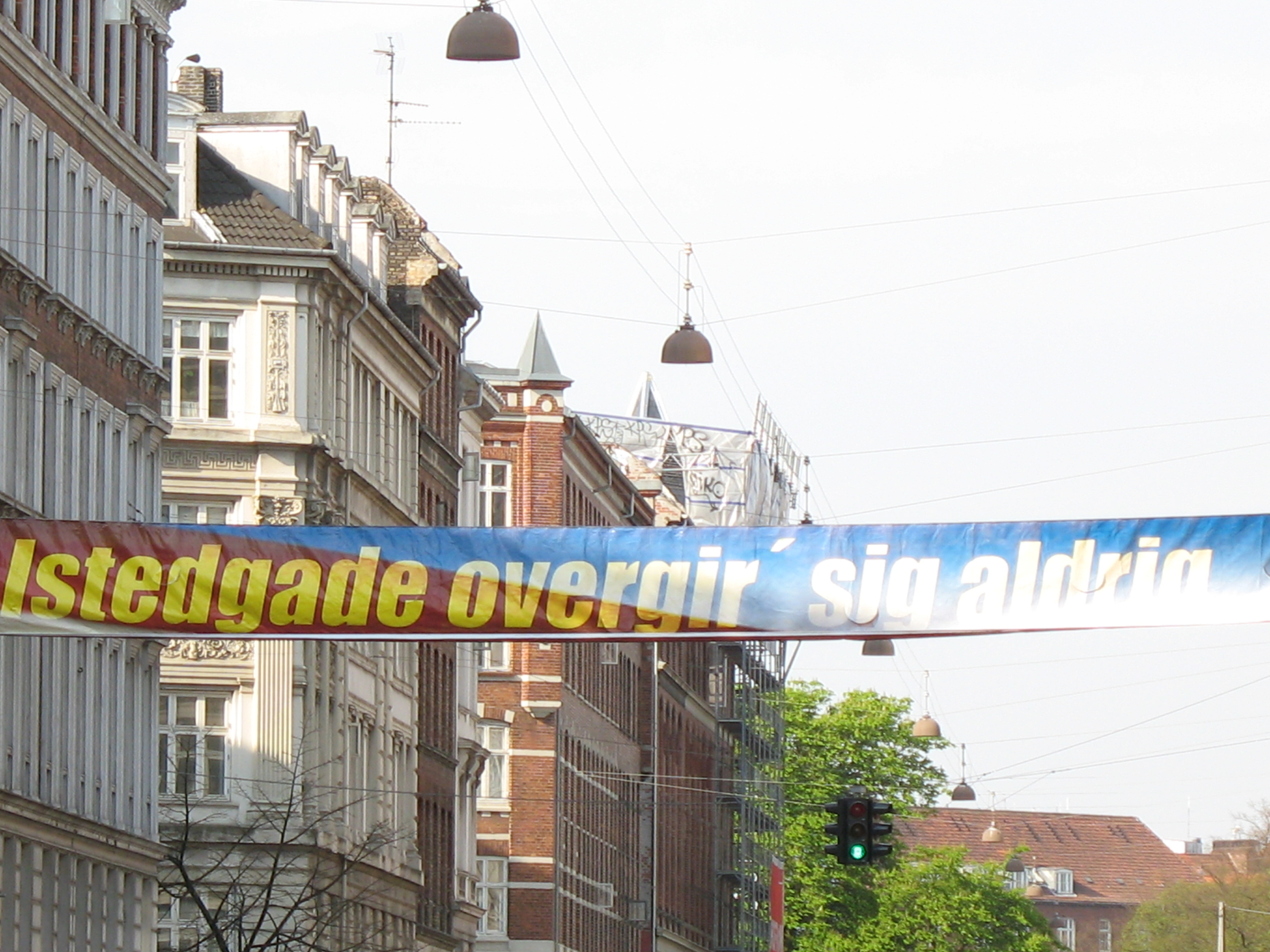
Istedgade overgiver (Istedgade never surrenders) banner

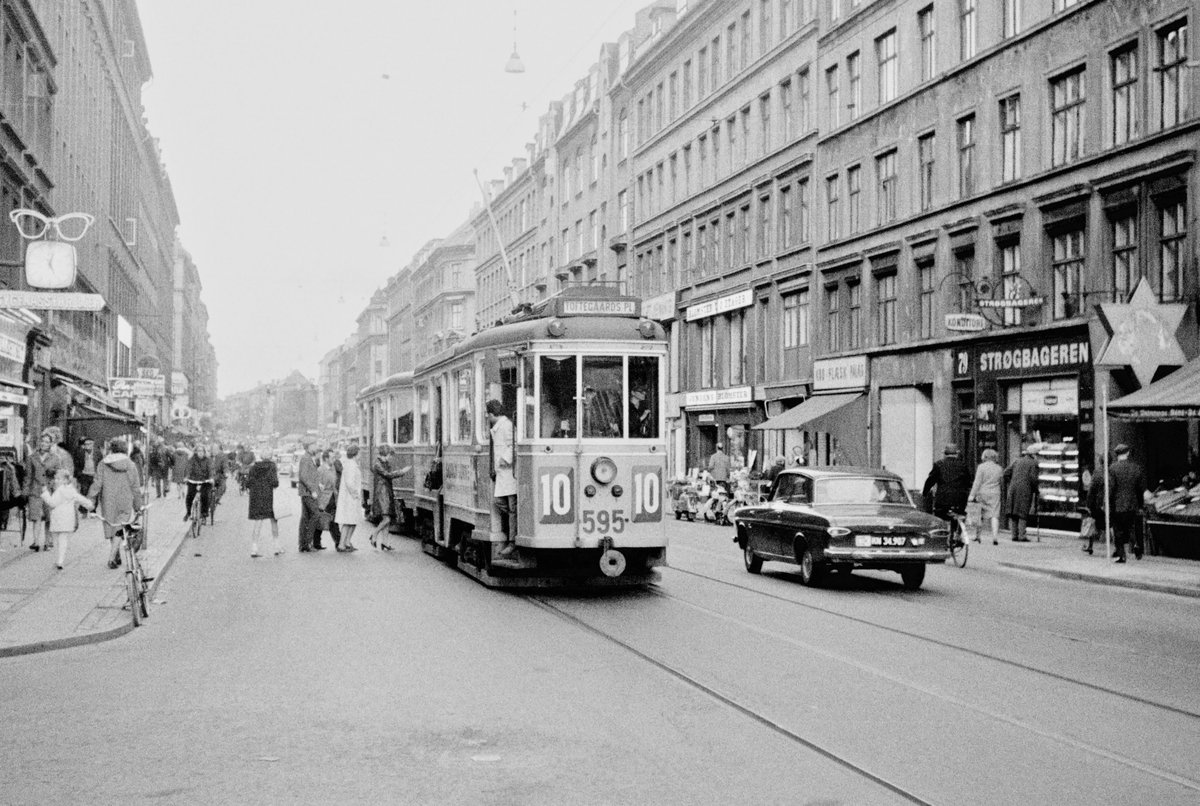
Istedgade in October 1968

Istedgade's history dates back to 1858, when the first buildings were completed around Gasvejen (today called Gasværksvej), but it was not until 1859 that Istedgade got its official name, the street subsequently growing rapidly towards the railway station, and in 1900 Istedgade reached Enghave Plads. The street is named in memory of the 1850 Battle of Isted in the First Schleswig War. Istedgade soon became known for being a colourful entertainment area, with its wild inns and prostitution. During World War II, Istedgade was known for its resistance to the Germans and the resistance group Holger Danske was founded in the back room of "Stjerne Radio" at no. 31, which is today a museum. During the Summer 1944 strike, there was a violent clash between the inhabitants of Vesterbro and the German military. After the "porn release" in 1969, Istedgade became one of the streets where almost every other store sold magazines, sex toys, etc.

The history of the street, rooted in the classic working class, contrasts with today's expensive refurbished apartments and modern city life. Before the urban renewal in the 1990s, the street was characterised by speculation building with small apartments of poor quality with great social poverty, but there was unity amongst the inhabitants. The slogan "Istedgade overgiver sig aldrig" (Istedgade never surrenders) originated in the People's strike in 1944, when leaflets were thrown out the windows of the upper apartments with the text "Rom og Paris kan I ta – men Stalingrad og Istedgade overgiver sig aldrig" (Rome and Paris you can take - but Stalingrad and Istedgade never surrender).

Istedgade is composed and diverse, and is one of the places in Copenhagen where there is life around the clock. Vesterbro in general and Istedgade in particular, over recent years have become attractive for young and resourceful citizens, mostly families with children, who against previous trends have chosen to stay in town instead of moving to the suburbs. Today, Istedgade and some of the adjacent side streets are known for the many hotels, designer shops, cafes, taverns, bars, sex shops and restaurants. In addition to the many tourists, there are also some street prostitutes, drug addicts, alcoholics and homeless people. In support of these are Kirkens Korshær (The Church's Army), Mariakirken (The Church of Mary) and the Mændenes Hjem (Men's Home). The prostitutes on Istedgade are often of foreign origin, mainly from Africa and Eastern Europe. In August 2012, Istedgade became the subject of much media coverage, due to the police's failure to intervene with the drug-pushers at Vesterbro.

== Notable buildings ==
The Church of Mary (No. 20) is from 1907 to 1909 and was designed by Andreas Clemmesen.

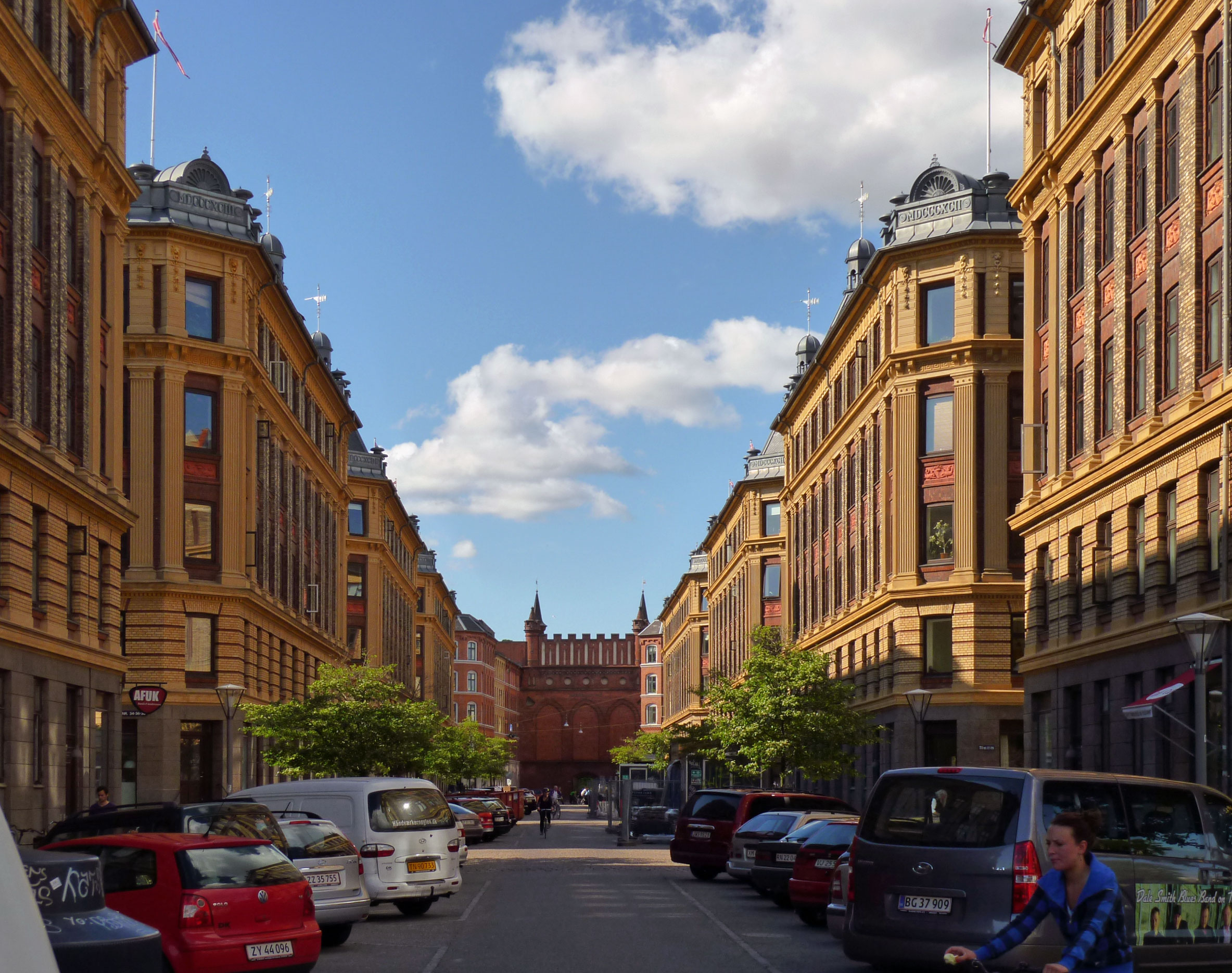
No. 70-72: The Shooting Range Wall as seen from Skydebanegade

The Shooting Range Wall, flanked by two residential buildings (No. 72) was constructed in 1887 when the Royal Copenhagen Shooting Society's shooting range (now Skydebanehaven) was shortened to keep people on Istedgade from being hit by stray bullets. The Gothic Revival style structure was designed by Ludvig Knudsen. The complex was listed on the Danish registry of protected buildings and places in 1982.

== Transport ==
The first part of the street is served by Copenhagen Central Station. The far end of the street is served by Enghave Plads metro station. Movia bus line 23 runs through the street on its ways from Valby railway station to Klampenborg railway station.

== In popular culture ==
Over the years, Istedgade has housed many of Denmark's actors, artists and writers. It was referred to by Liva Weel, Tom Kristensen and Emil Bønnelycke. The love for Istedgade is still to be found in today's celebrities' work; Dan Turèll's "Charlie Parker i Istedgade" and Natasja Saad's "Gi’ mig Danmark tilbage" (Give me Denmark Back). Istedgade's intense environment was the overriding source of inspiration for crime writer Sara Blædel's critically acclaimed 2008 novel Aldrig mere fri (Never More Free).

The protagonist, Ole Jastrau, in Tom Kristensen's 1930 novel Hærværk (Heritage), lives on Istedgade. On the way down after lunch, the following exchange about the advantage of Istedgade falls between Jastrau and the poet Steffensen :

"You," [Steffensen] murmured as Jastrau came out of the store again. "Istedgade is now a nice street." "Why?" "Because it's long." Jastrau was about to laugh. But then he discovered Steffensen's distant, shining gaze. And he himself had to stare down the long street. It was infinite. The morning sun flashed in a myriad of open window panes as in drops of water, and far beyond Enghaveplads the gray and yellow facades became airy like distant mountains until they dissolved in a flickering mist.

— Tom Kristensen, Hærværk, p. 61. Gyldendal, 1966

Peter Belli had a big Danish hit in 1978 with an interpretation of the song "Copacabana" by Barry Manilow. The Danish version of the disco classic was named "Istedgade", and the lyrics of the song take place in the street. The chorus is "Istedgade, i Istedgade er der altid en hel del ballade..." (Istedgade, in Istedgade there is always a lot of trouble ... ). The song has become a classic in Danish popular music, and gained new life when the satirical radio program Tæskeholdet included it as a regular part of its program, and also included it on its CD.

28 Istedgade is used as a location at 1:05:32 in the 1978 Olsen-banden film The Olsen Gang Sees Red.

The street is the location of Tove Ditlevsen's 1967 novel Childhood.

== See also ==
- Halmtorvet
