= Skydebanehaven =

Park in Copenhagen, Denmark

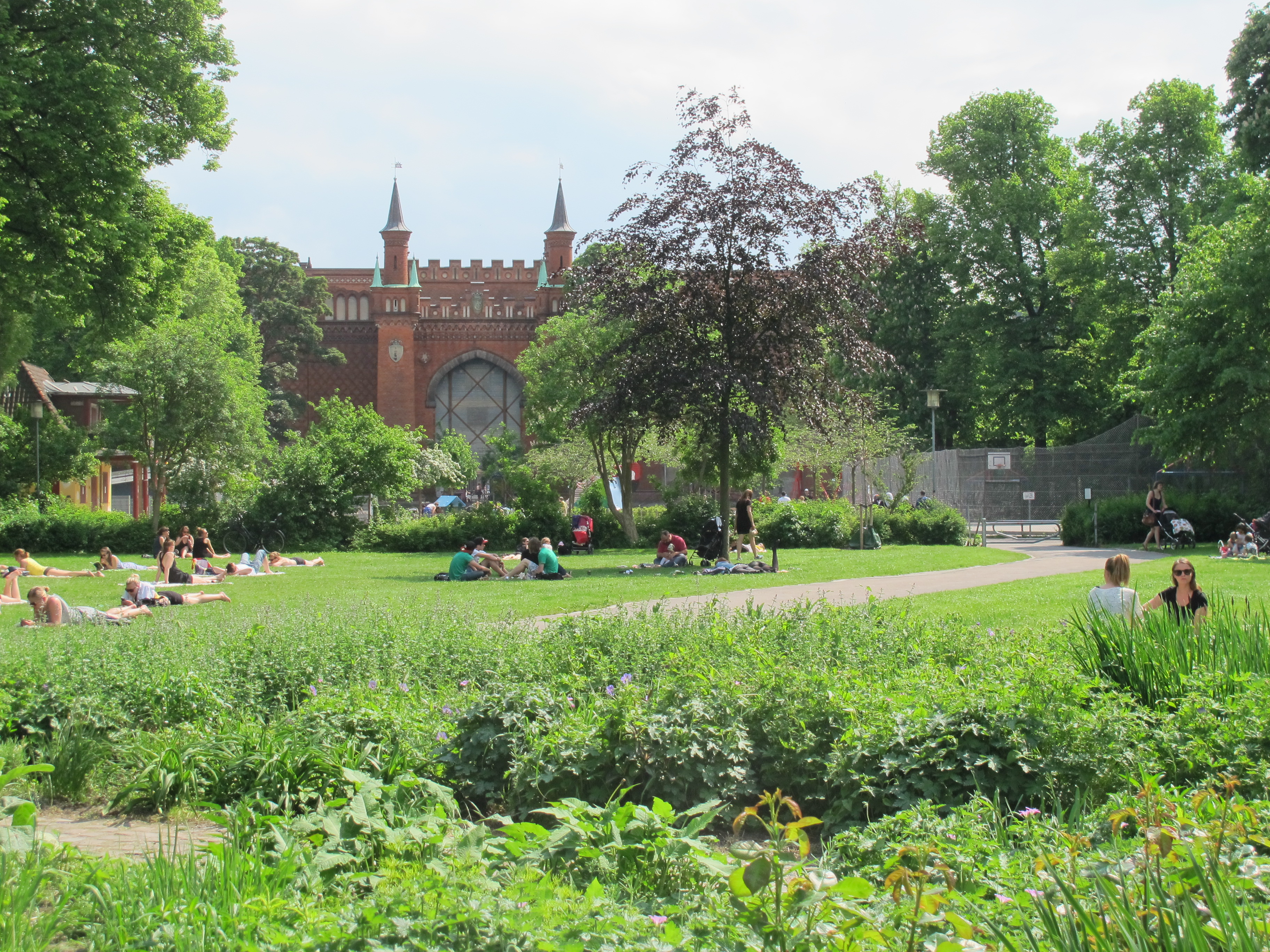
- The park with the Shooting Range Wall as a backdrop
- Interactive map of Skydebanehaven
- Location: Copenhagen, Denmark
- Coordinates: 55°40′16″N 12°33′14″E
- Created: 1949
- Status: Open all year

Skydebanehaven (in English, 'The Shooting Range Gardens') is a small public park in the heart of the Vesterbro district of Copenhagen, Denmark. Its name refers to the former shooting range of the Royal Copenhagen Shooting Society which used to be located on the site. The most distinctive feature of the park is the Neo-Gothic Shooting Range Wall which was constructed in 1887 to shield traffic on Istedgade from stray bullets. The other end of the park is bounded by the rear of the former headquarters of the Shooting Society, a Neoclassical mansion which has more recently housed the Museum of Copenhagen.

Access to the park is either through a small gate in the Shooting Range Wall, through an unassuming gate next to Absalonsgade 14 (off Vesterbrogade), or a third gate at the northeastern and of Matthæusgade. The section of the park located closest to Istedgade is occupied by a public playground. The Vesterbrogade end of the park is dominated by lawns and flower beds.

== History ==
=== The Shooting Society's shooting range ===
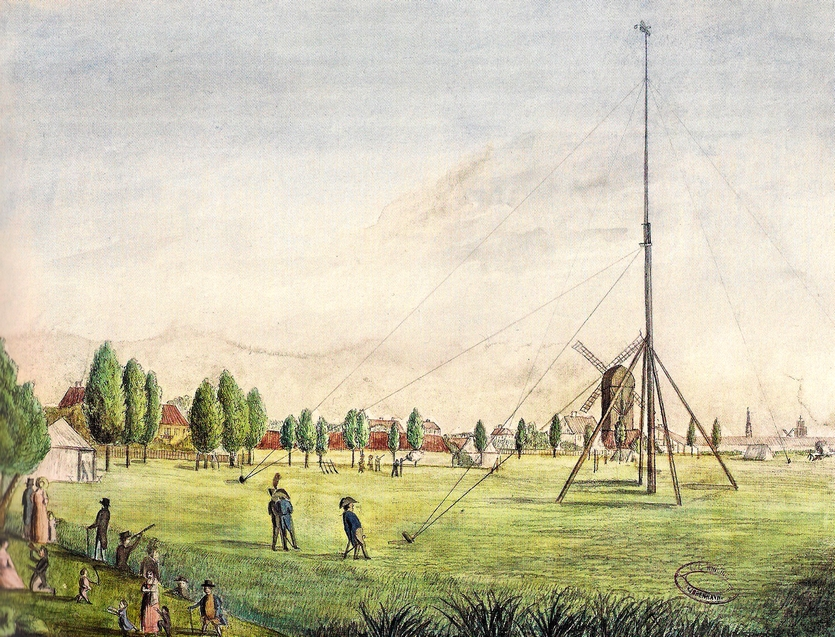
The shooting range, 1830

The Royal Copenhagen Shooting Society was originally based in Kompagnistræde.

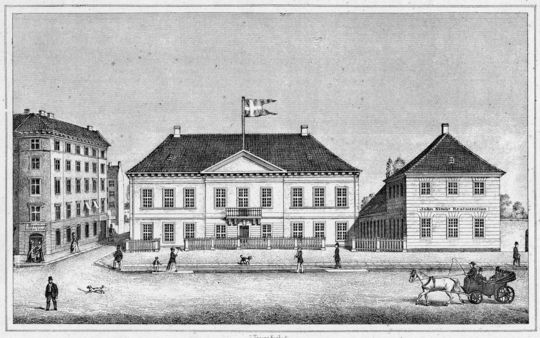
The Royal Copenhagen Shooting Society's building, 1888

In the 1750s, it established a shooting range at a site outside the Western City Gate. In 1782 the society acquired a 3.5-hectare (8.6-acre) piece of land, stretching from present day Vesterbrogade to the beach just south of the city. The society also built a mansion, completed in 1787, which was to serve as a venue for its active social life.

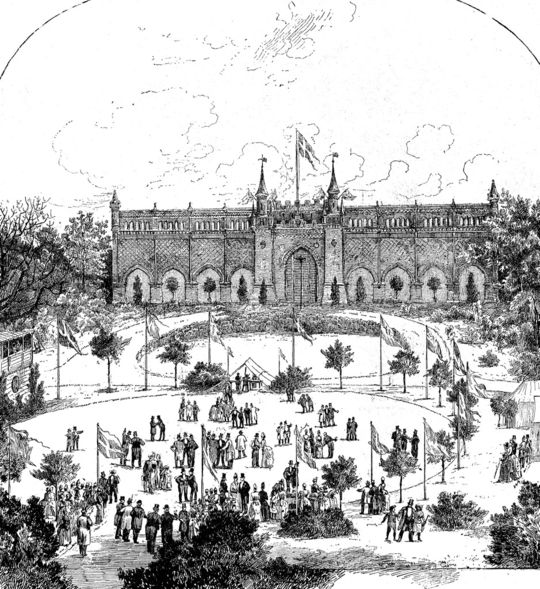
The shooting range with the new Shooting Range Wall in the 1880s

When Vesterbro started to develop in the second half of the 19th century, after the city had been allowed to develop beyond its now decommissioned fortifications, the city expropriated much of the Shooting Society's grounds. In 1887 a tall wall was constructed to shield newly established Istedgade from stray bullets from the shooting range. The wall was designed by the architect Ludvig Knudsen in a Neo-Gothic style. Knudsen also modernized the interior of the Shooting Society's mansion in the 1890s and added a small new wing towards the gardens.

=== A municipal park ===
In 1949 the society moved to Sølyst Manor at Klampenborg north of Copenhagen, while the city acquired the rest of the property on Vesterbrogade.

== Buildings and structures ==
=== Shooting Range Wall ===
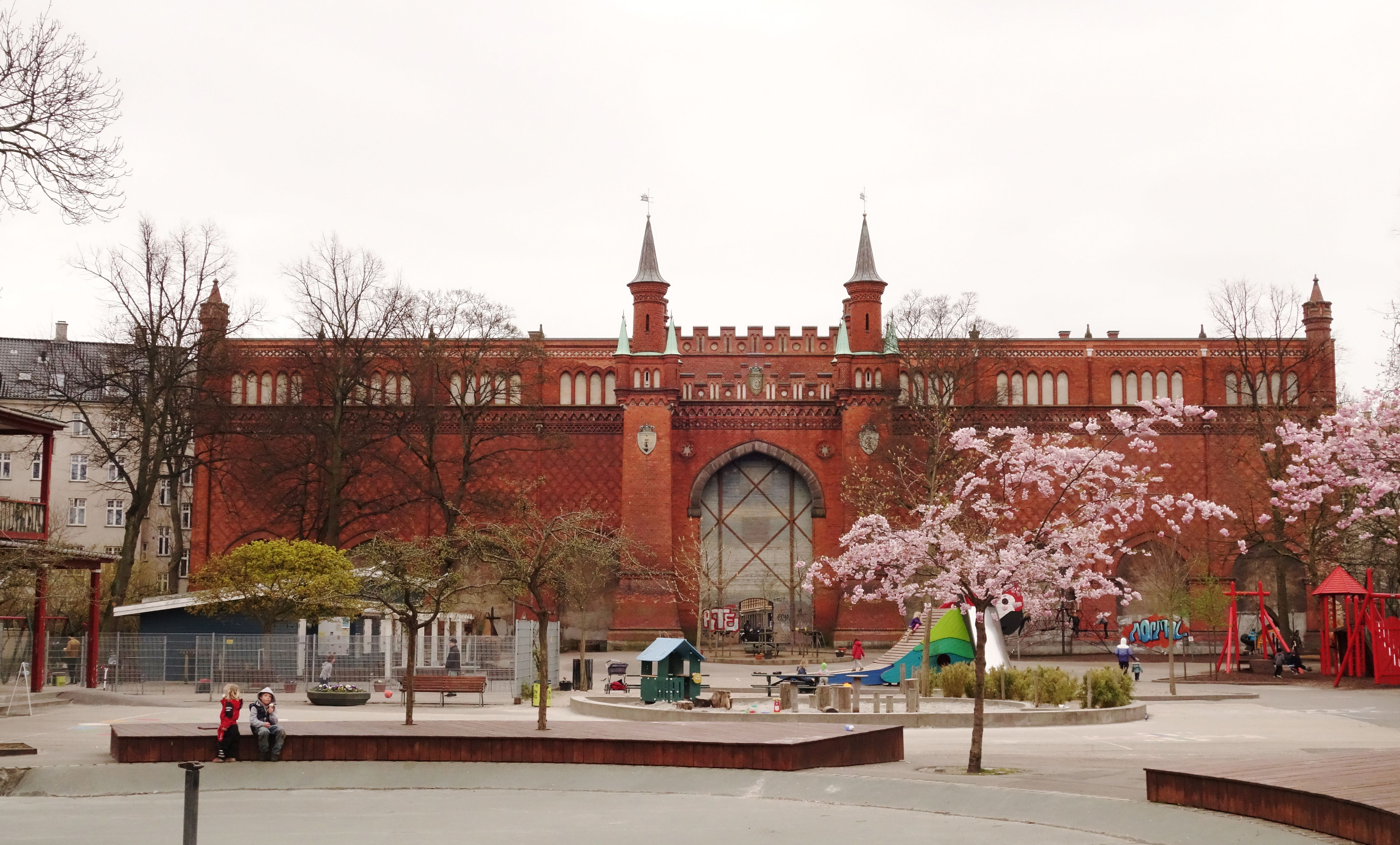
The Shooting Range Wall seen from the park

The Shooting Range Wall, designed by Ludvig Claussen, was built in red brick in a Neo-Gothic style by Ludvig Knudsen. The wall is flanked by two apartment buildings. The wall is supported by heavy buttresses towards the park. The wall is topped by four small towers with conical spires and its central section is crenellated. The design employs a number of other decorative elements, including a Lombard band, blinded arcades, decorative brickwork and two coats of arms. The complex was listed in the Danish registry of protected buildings and places in 1989.

=== Royal Copenhagen Shooting Society building ===
The Royal Copenhagen Shooting Society's former building is built to a Neoclassical design by Johan Henrich Brandemann (1736–1803). The building was expanded by Ludvig Claussen with a small new wing towards the gardens.

== Skydebanehaven today ==
The park contains a playground, lawns and flower beds.
