= St. Andrew's Church, Gentofte Municipality =

St. Andrew's Church
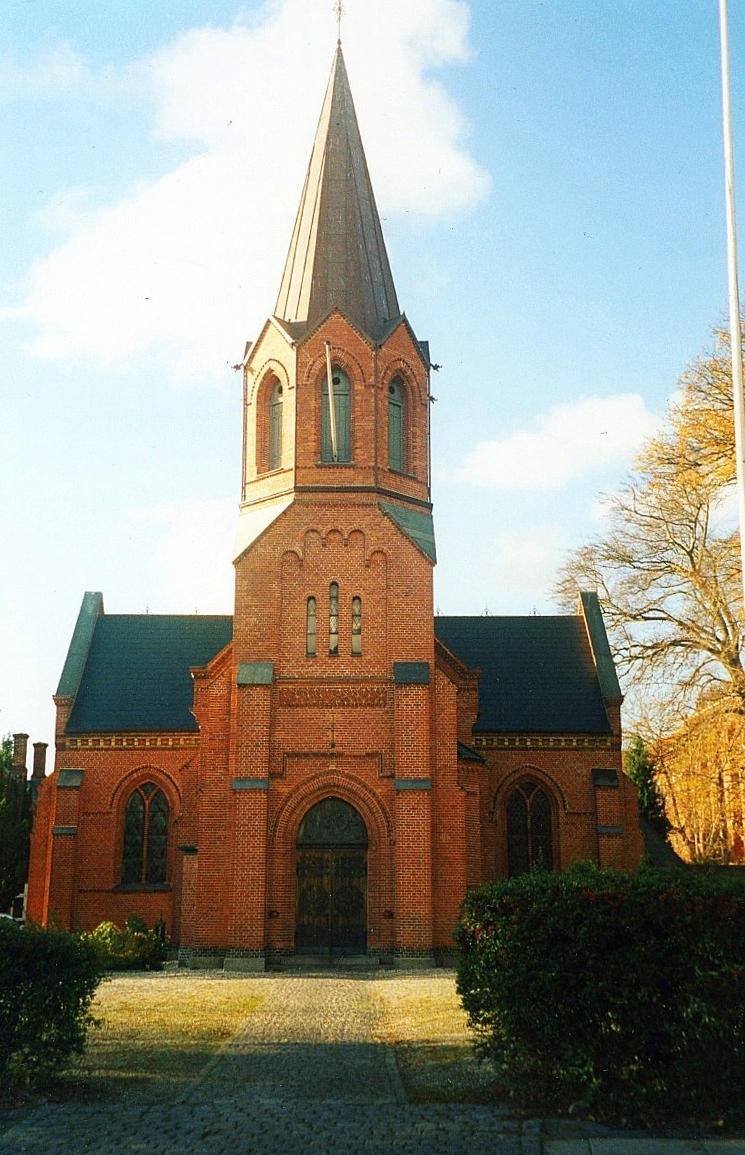
- St. Andrew's Church
- St. Andrew's Church
- 55°45′42.9″N 12°34′8.7″E
- Location: Ordrup, Gentofte Municipality
- Country: Denmark
- Denomination: Roman Catholic
- Website: Official website

History
- Status: Church
- Founded: 1874
- Dedication: St. Andrew

Architecture
- Functional status: Active
- Architect: Ludvig Knudsen
- Style: National Romantic

Administration
- Diocese: Copenhagen

St. Andrew's Church (Danish: Sankt Andreas Kirke) is a Roman Catholic church in Ordrup, Gentofte Municipality, Copenhagen, Denmark.

== History ==
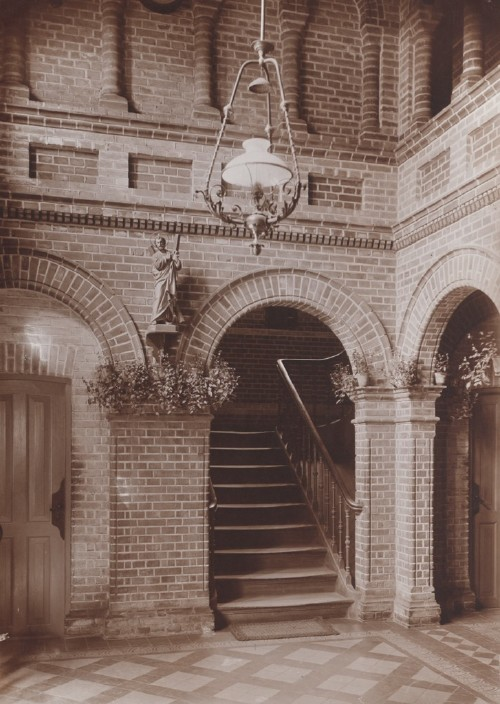
The vestibule of St. Andrew's College

The church was built at the initiative of Polly Berling, the widow of book printer and Berlingske Tidende-owner Carl Berling. She had converted to Catholicism in 1869. The couple lived at Ordrupshøj in Ordrup.

After her husband's death in 1871, Polly Berling was able to dispose freely of the land and wealth and wanted to do something for her new faith. Her original intention was to build an orphanage led by Sisters of St. Joseph on the estate but Father Hermann Grüder, Prefect of Denmark, convinced her that there was a greater need for a Jesuit boys' school.

The architect Ludvig Knudsen was commissioned to design the building. Construction began in 1871 and it was consecrated on 25 May 1873. It was the third Roman Catholic church to be completed in Denmark since the Reformation. The church was until 1953 used by the Society of Jesus in Denmark. During her visits to Rome, Polly Berling had been particularly fond of the church of Sant'Andrea delle Fratte and the new church and school were therefore dedicated to St. Andrew.

The school was originally located in rural surroundings. It was also open to non-Catholics but initially only had some 40 students. The number increased to over 200 after the surrounding fields were built over with single family detached homes in about 1900. The growth of the northern suburbs also created the basis of a local congregation and St. Andrew's Church was converted into a Roman Catholic parish church in 1913. The German Jesuits moved back to Germany after the end of World War I and the school closed in 1920. The parish was taken over by French Dominicans in 1953 at the initiative of Bishop Johannes Theodor Suhr. The Dominicans used the church until 1976.

The parish of St. Andrew's was merged with St. Thérès's Parish in Hellerup in 2008, since which the church serves as a chapel of ease.

== Architecture ==
The church is built in red brick. Its colorful interior was painted white in 1959 but the original colors were reconstructed in 2007.

== See also ==
- List of Jesuit sites
