= Museum of Copenhagen =

Historical museum in Copenhagen, Denmark

Coordinates: 55.67234°N 12.553451°E

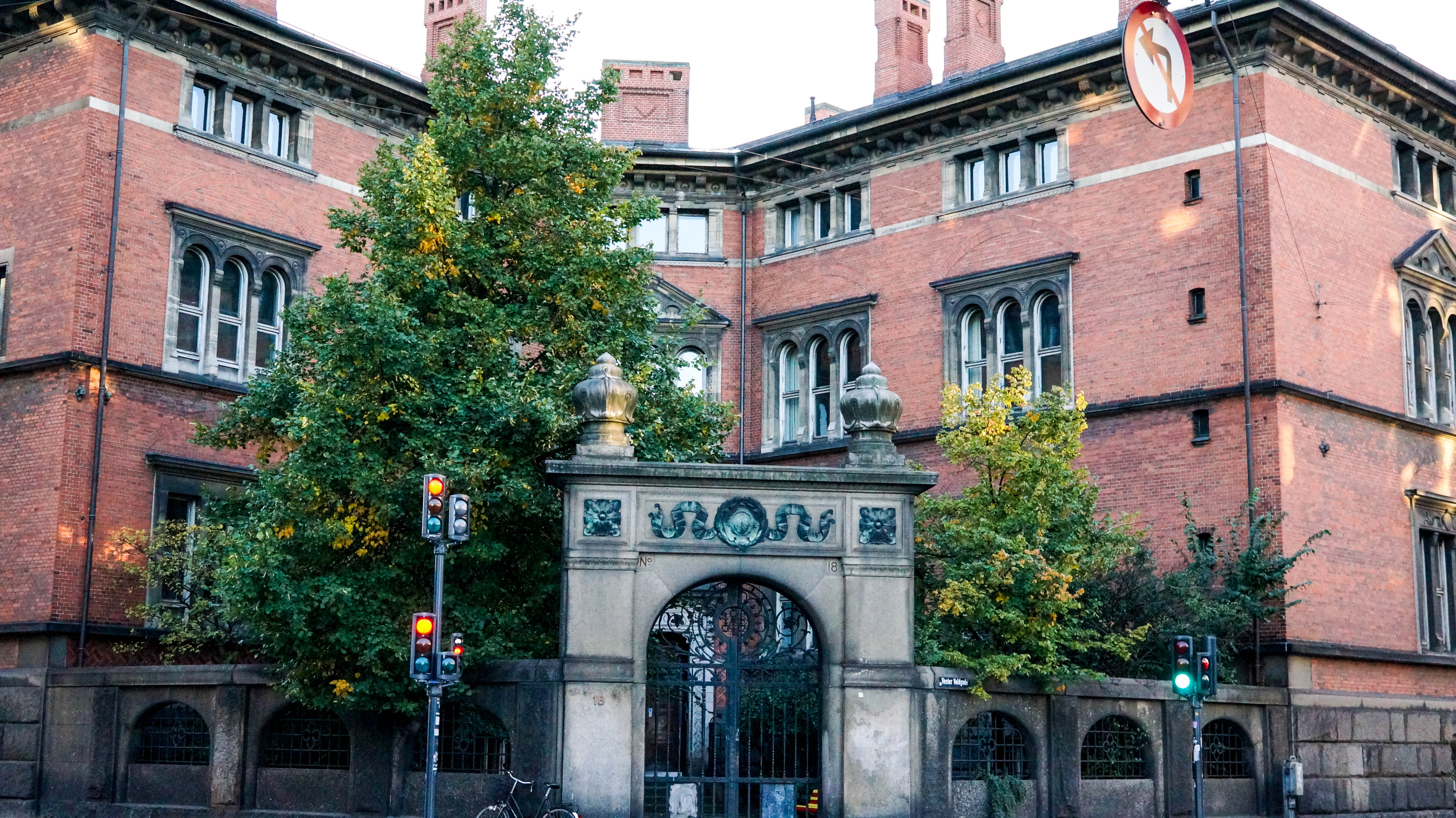
Museum of Copenhagen

The Museum of Copenhagen (Danish: Københavns Bymuseum) is the official museum of Copenhagen, Denmark, documenting the city's history from the 12th century to the present.

== History ==
The Museum of Copenhagen was founded in 1901. Starting in 1925, the museum had a permanent exhibition in the attic of Copenhagen City Hall.

As the collections grew, the attic became too small and in 1956 the museum moved to the former building of the Royal Copenhagen Shooting Society (Det Kongelige Kjøbenhavnske Skydeselska) in Vesterbro. The former shooting range became a public park, still known as Skydebanehaven. The buildings themselves dated to 1787 and were built based upon drawings by architect Johan Henrich Brandemann (1736–1803).

The museum took over the former Maria Kruuse School in the adjacent Absalongade in 1984, and is now used for administration as well as the museum's archives. Part of the street was turned into a museum street featuring historic street furniture.

In 2010, the museum changed its name to the Copenhagen Museum. In 2018, the museum announced a planned relocation to Stormgade in central Copenhagen.

== Today ==
The Copenhagen Museum is owned and operated by the City of Copenhagen. It now operates in an affiliation with Thorvaldsen Museum and Kunsthallen Nikolaj as part of an association of cultural institutions known as Historie & Kunst.
