= Klemensker =

- Village
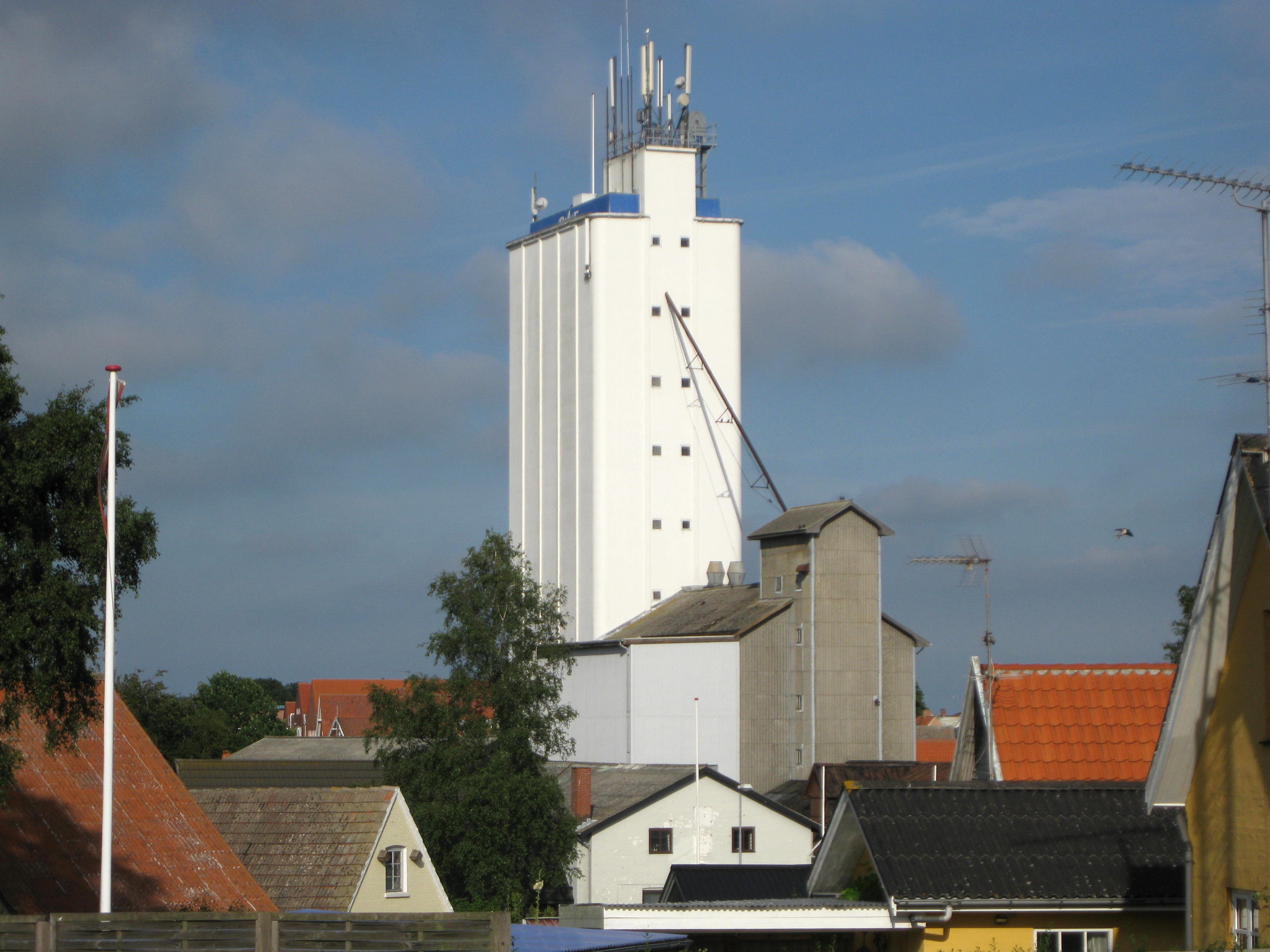
- Klemensker's silo

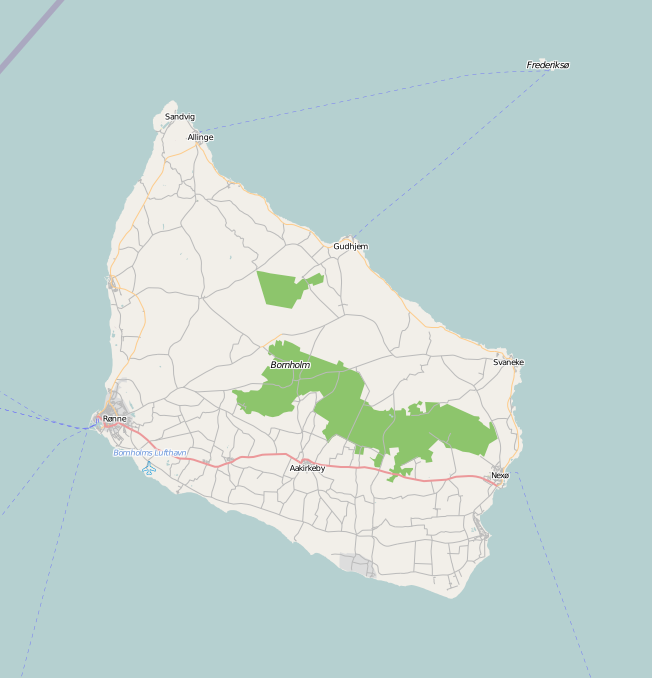
- Location on Bornholm
- Coordinates: 55°10′27″N 14°48′24″E
- Country: Denmark
- Region: Capital (Hovedstaden)
- Municipality: Bornholm

Population (2026)
  - Total: 607
- Time zone: UTC+1 (CET)
  - Summer (DST): UTC+2 (CEST)

Klemensker is a village in the north-western part of the Danish island of Bornholm. With a population of 607 (1 January 2026), it is located on a crossroads 13 km north-east of Rønne, 7 km east of the coastal town Hasle and 12 km south of Allinge. It is known for its cheese production.

Beginning at the village inn, Klemens Kro, the road (Danish vej) Simblegårdsvej begins with an extremely steep drop and later a long climb up the Klemensker Bakke (Klemensker Hill). The farm (Danish gård) Simblegård is to the north.

== History ==
The origins of Klemensker possibly date back to around 3800 BC with evidence of a community in today's Smedegade. A number of runestones have been found in the village while some of the roads are documented in records from the 14th century. The village inn is referred to in documents from 1548 but the first signs of homes around the church are from 1898. The first school opened in 1906. Only one of several dairies remains today while the old railway closed in 1953.

== Church and name ==
Like a number of Bornholm's localities, the name Klemensker is derived from its church, Sankt Clemens Kirke, the suffix -ker denoting church in the local dialect. There is documentary evidence of a St. Clement's Church from as early as 1335 when it is referred to in Latin as beati Clementis parrochia but the present church, constructed on the hilltop site of a former building, was completed in 1882, standing 114 meters above sea level. The interior renovation from 1960 includes work by Paul Høm from Gudhjem.

== World cheese award ==
Bornholms Andelsmejeri, the island's only dairy, produces a variety of milk products and cheeses including its Danish Blue cheese which in 1980 and 1998 won the World Cheese Champion award in Wisconsin. Each year the international division, St. Clemens Food Products, exports some 4,500 tons of cheese to destinations around the globe.

== Former railway ==
Klemensker Station used to serve the Allinge Railway which connected Rønne to Allinge and Sandvig near Hammershus from 1913 to 1953.

== Gallery ==
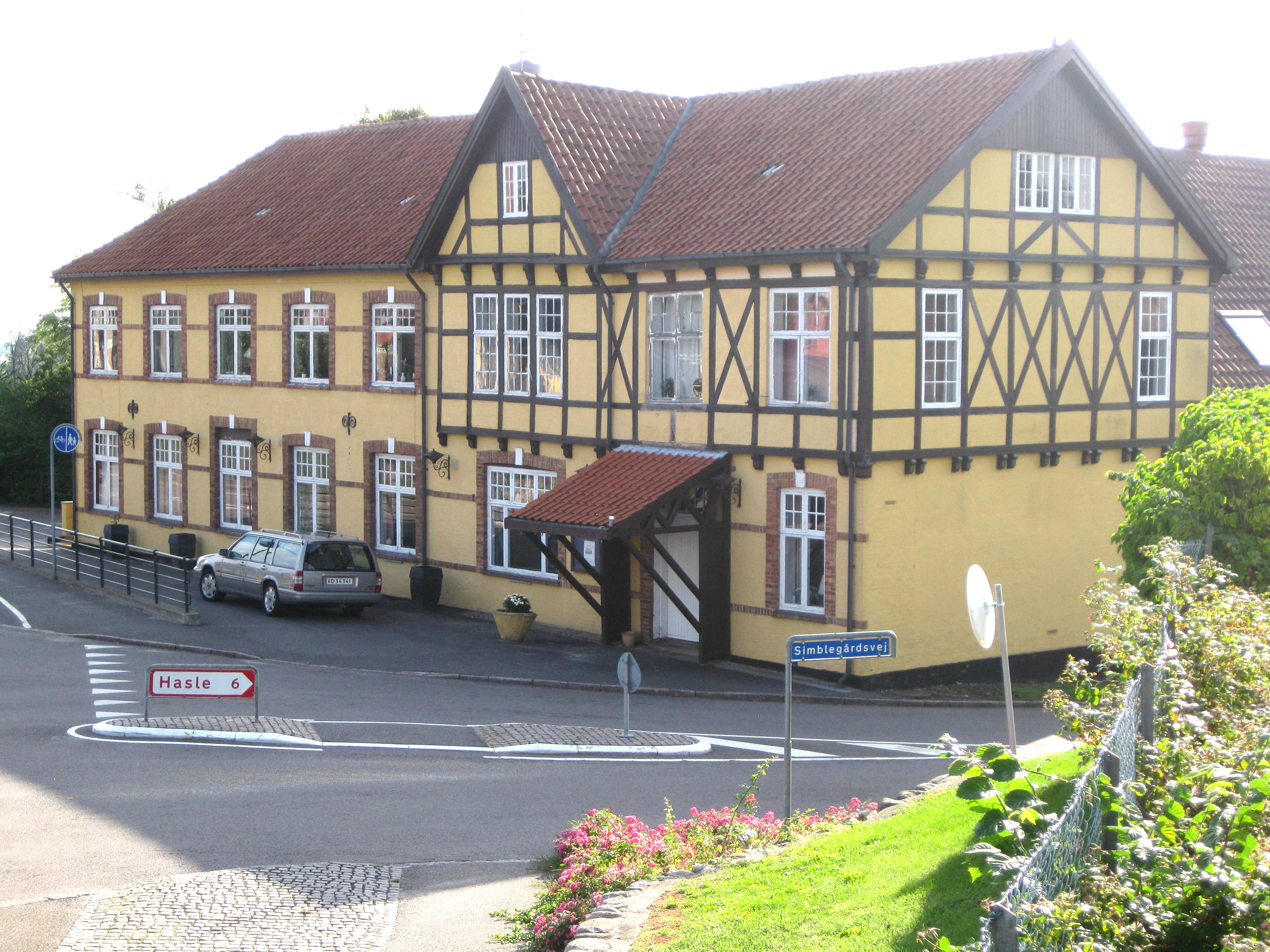
Village inn, Klemens Kro

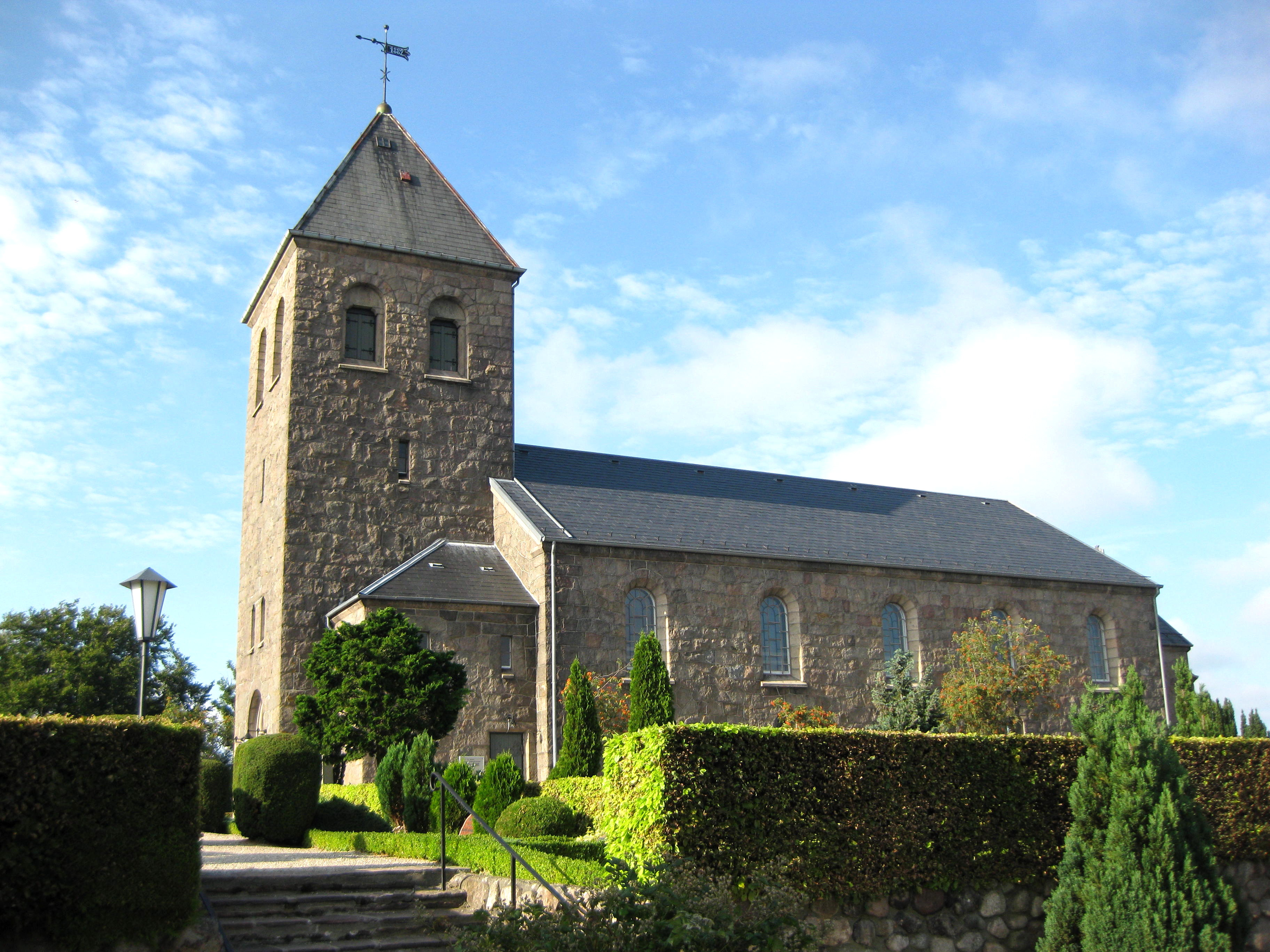
St Clemens Church

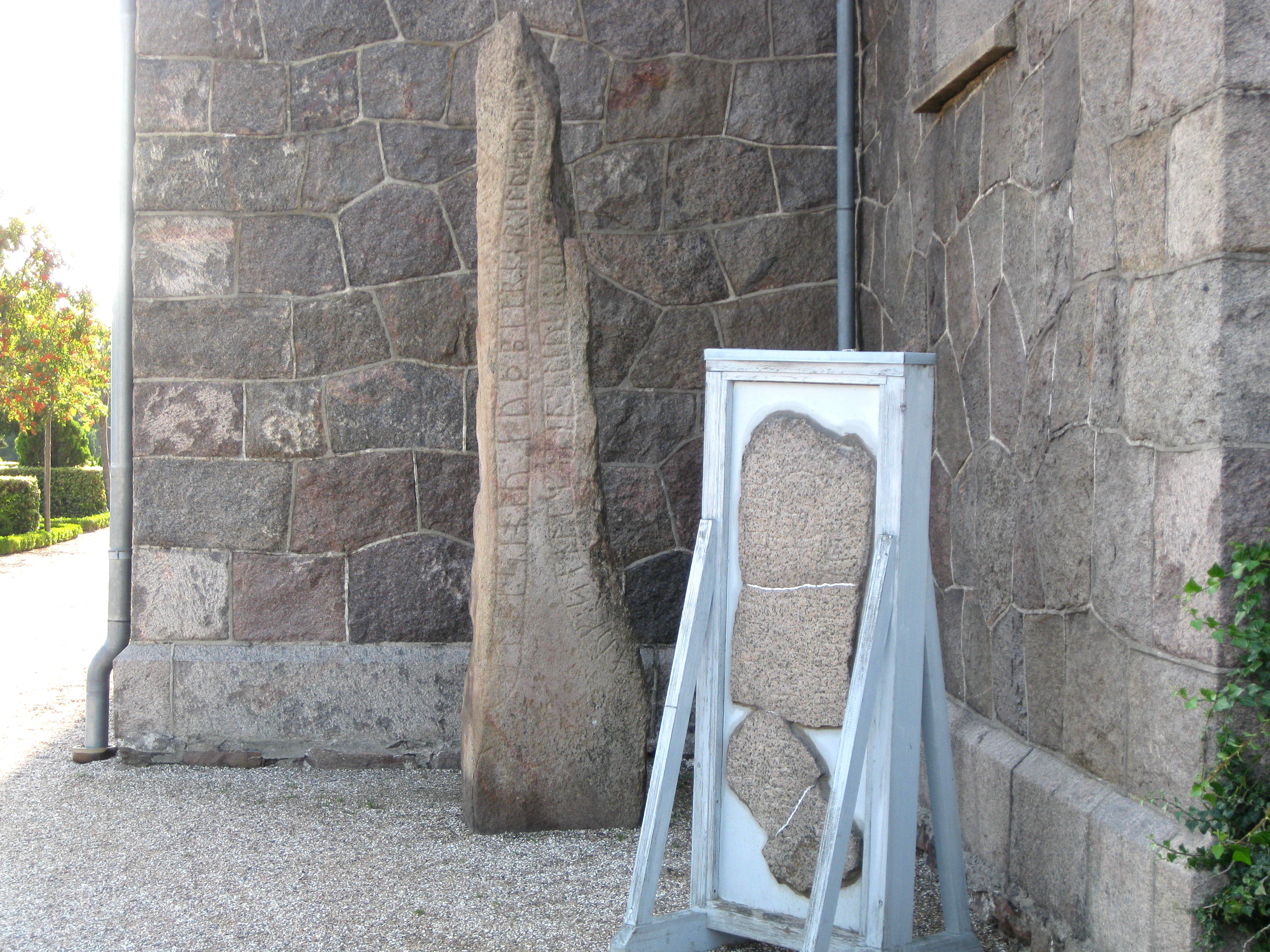
Runestone at the church

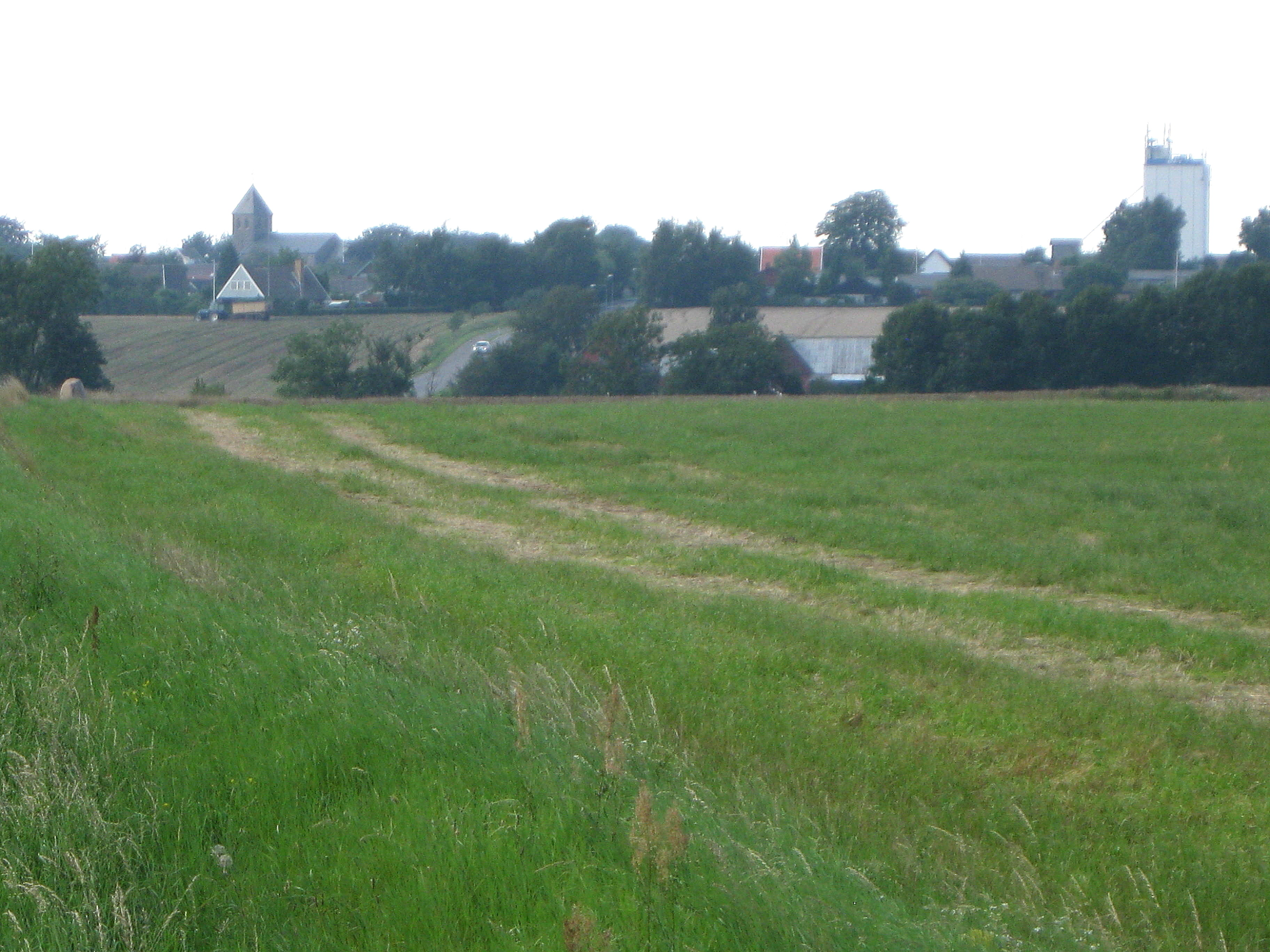
View of Klemensker
