= St. Stephen's Church, Copenhagen =

St. John's Church
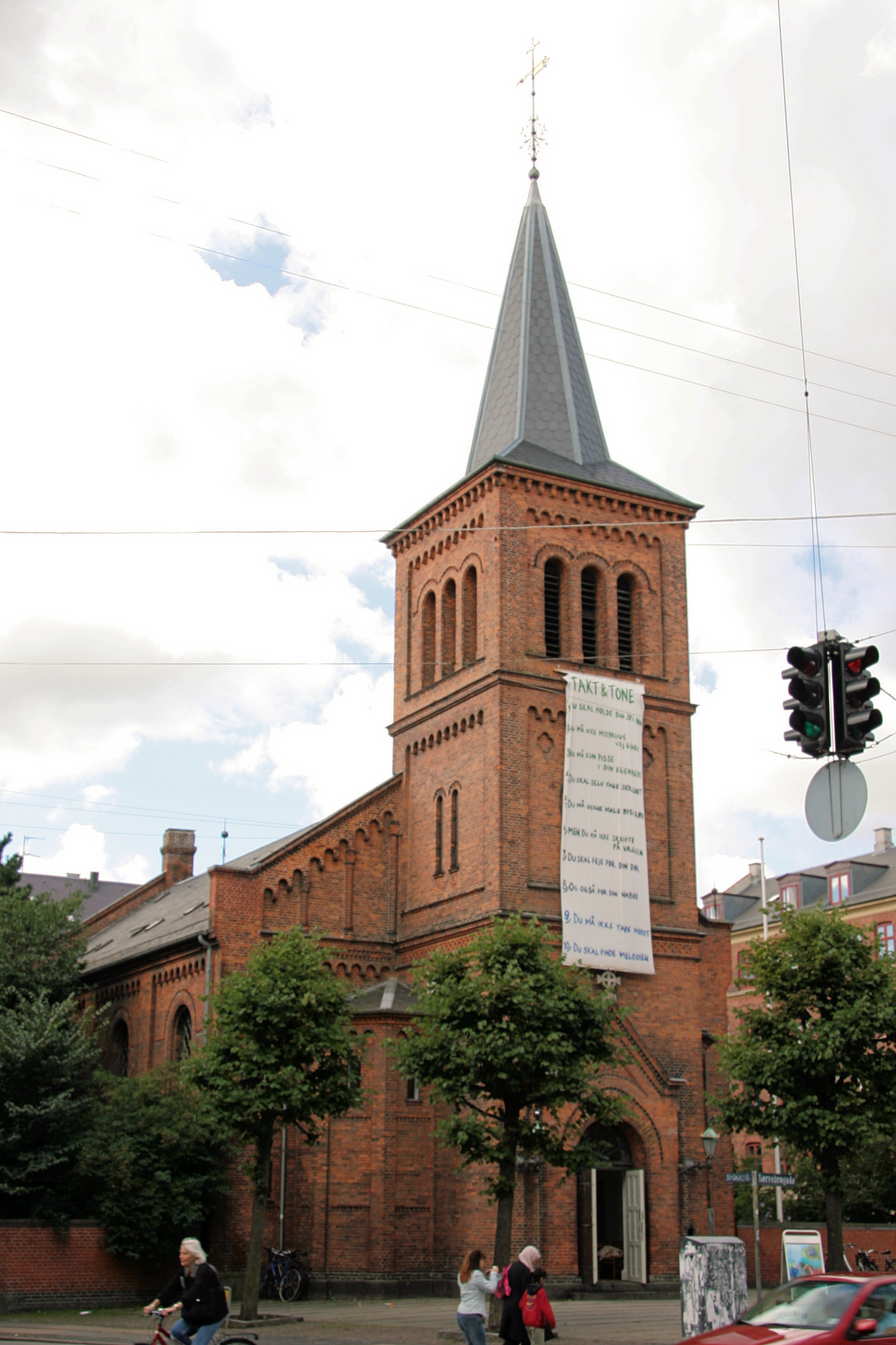
- St. John's Church
- 55°41′48″N 12°32′40.5″E
- Location: Nørrebro, Copenhagen
- Country: Denmark
- Denomination: Church of Denmark

History
- Status: Church

Architecture
- Architect: Ludvig Knudsen
- Architectural type: Church
- Style: Gothic Revival
- Completed: 1874

Specifications
- Height: 31 m
- Materials: Brick

Administration
- Diocese: Diocese of Copenhagen

St. Stephen's Church (Danish: Sankt Stefans Kirke) is a Church of Denmark parish church located at Nørrebrogade 199 in the Nørrebro district of Copenhagen, Denmark. Built in 1874 to designs by Ludvig Knudsen, it is the second oldest church in the district. The composers Knud Jeppesen and Jens Bjerre Jacobsen have both served as organists.

== History ==
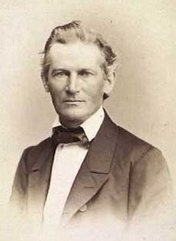
Rudolph Frimodt

The first church in Nørrebro, St. John's, was completed at Blegdamsvej in 1861. The new St. John's Parish, which was disjoined from Trinitatis and Our Lady's Parishes, covered an extensive area which included all of Nørrebro and Østerbro and reached all the way to Hellerup and Brønshøj. The church's first pastor, Rudolph Frimodt, launched a campaign for more churches in the new districts of Copenhagen.

In 1872, Frimodt arranged a meeting at Store Ravnsborg with the purpose of establishing a new church in the outer Nørrebro area. He ultimately managed to raise 34,000 Danish rigsdaler for the construction, 6,000 rigsdaler for a rectory and 10,000 rigsdaler for a trust that would pay the future pastor. Baron Løvenskjold, the owner of Kristinedal and Nykro, contributed a corner of his garden at the corner of Havremarksvej provided the site.

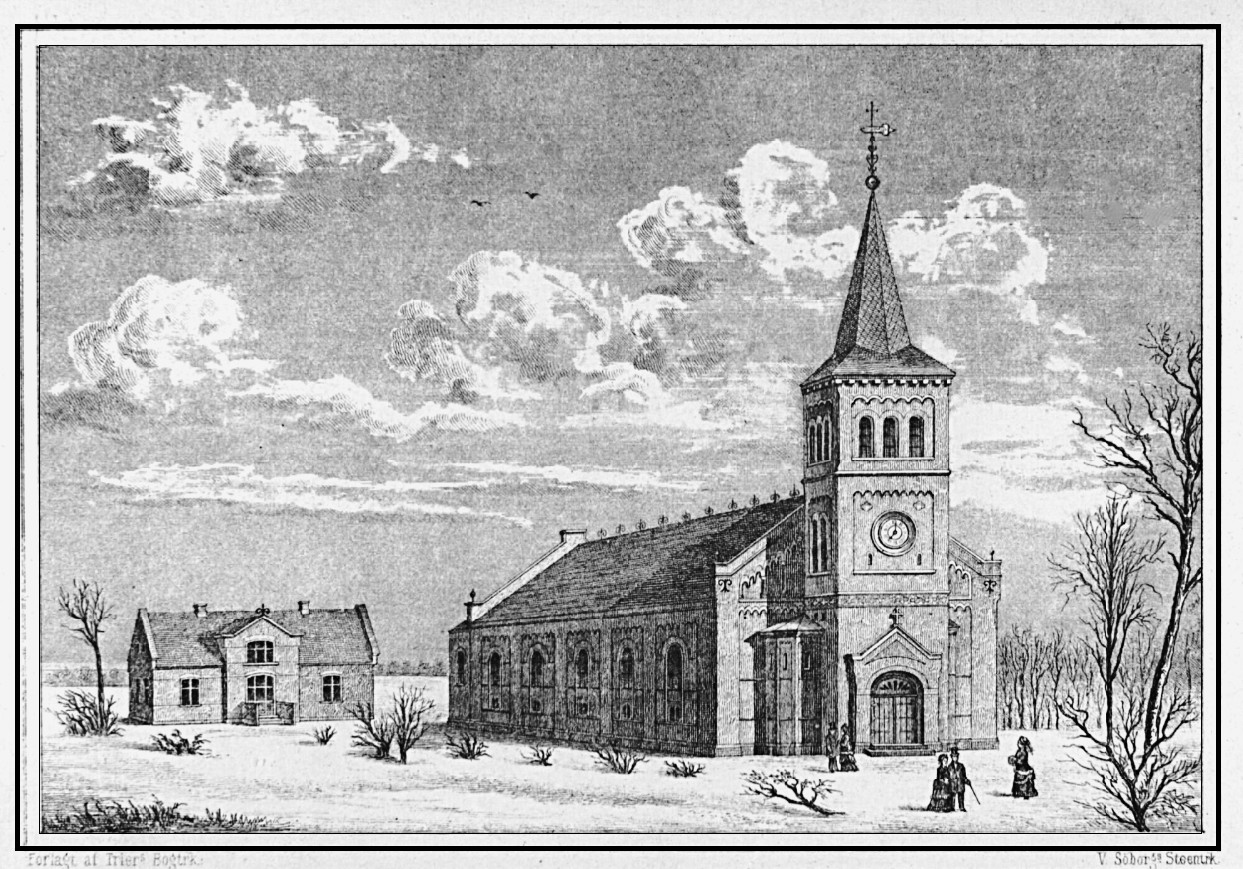
St. Stephen's Church shortly after it was built

It was decided to name the church after Saint Stephen, one of the seven deacons appointed by the Apostles to distribute food and charitable aid to poorer members of the community in the early church, reflecting the fire social conditions that characterized the outer Nørrebro area.

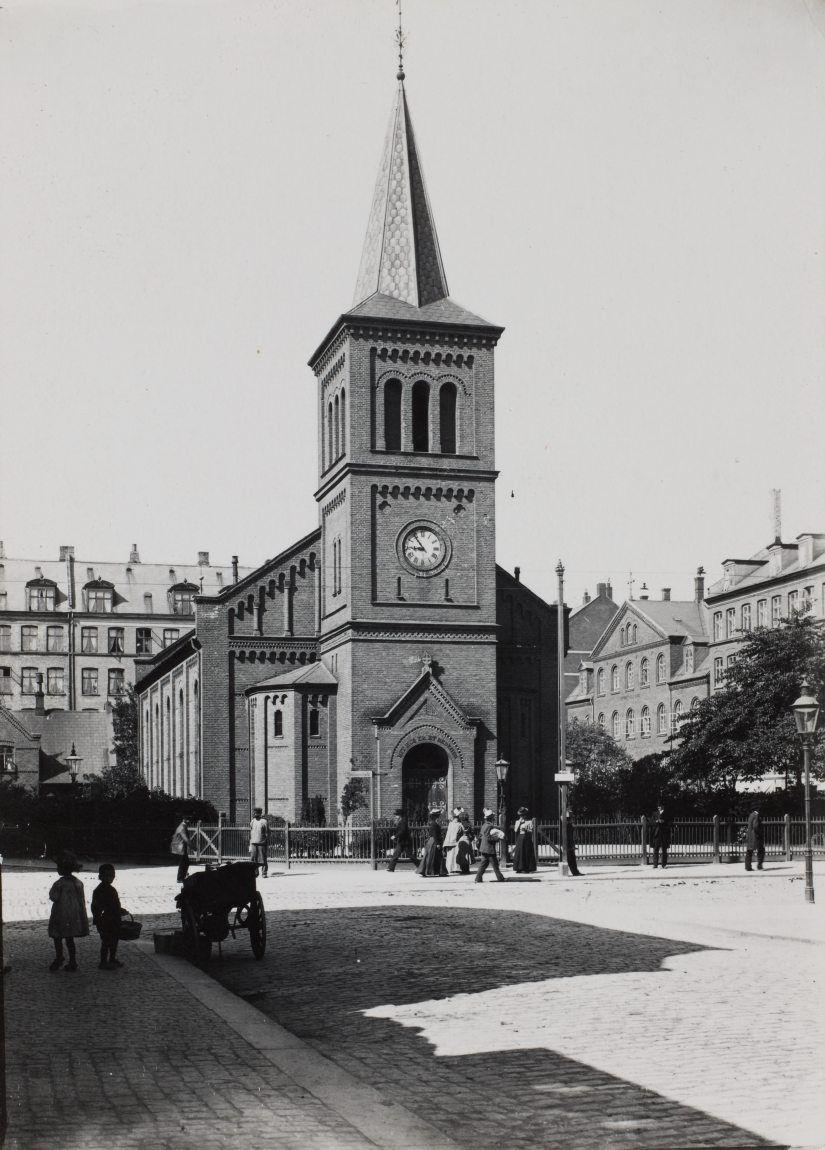
The church photographed by Fritz Theodor Benzen in 1902

The architect Ludvig Knudsen was charged with designing the church. The foundation stone was set on 18 June 1873 and the church was consecrated on 26 December (St. Stephen's Day) 1874. The two first pastors;mdash&Peter Volf and Ivar Dall;mdash&were both representatives of the Inner Mission.

The population of the new St. Stephen's Parish grew rapidly. In 1877, 800 children were born in the parish. In 1889, the number had grown to 1405. In 1890–1912, five new parishes were therefore disjoined from that of St. Stephen's: Holy Cross Parish (1890), Capernaum Parish (1895), Simon's Parish (1903), Kingo (1908) and Anna's Parish (1912).

== Architecture ==
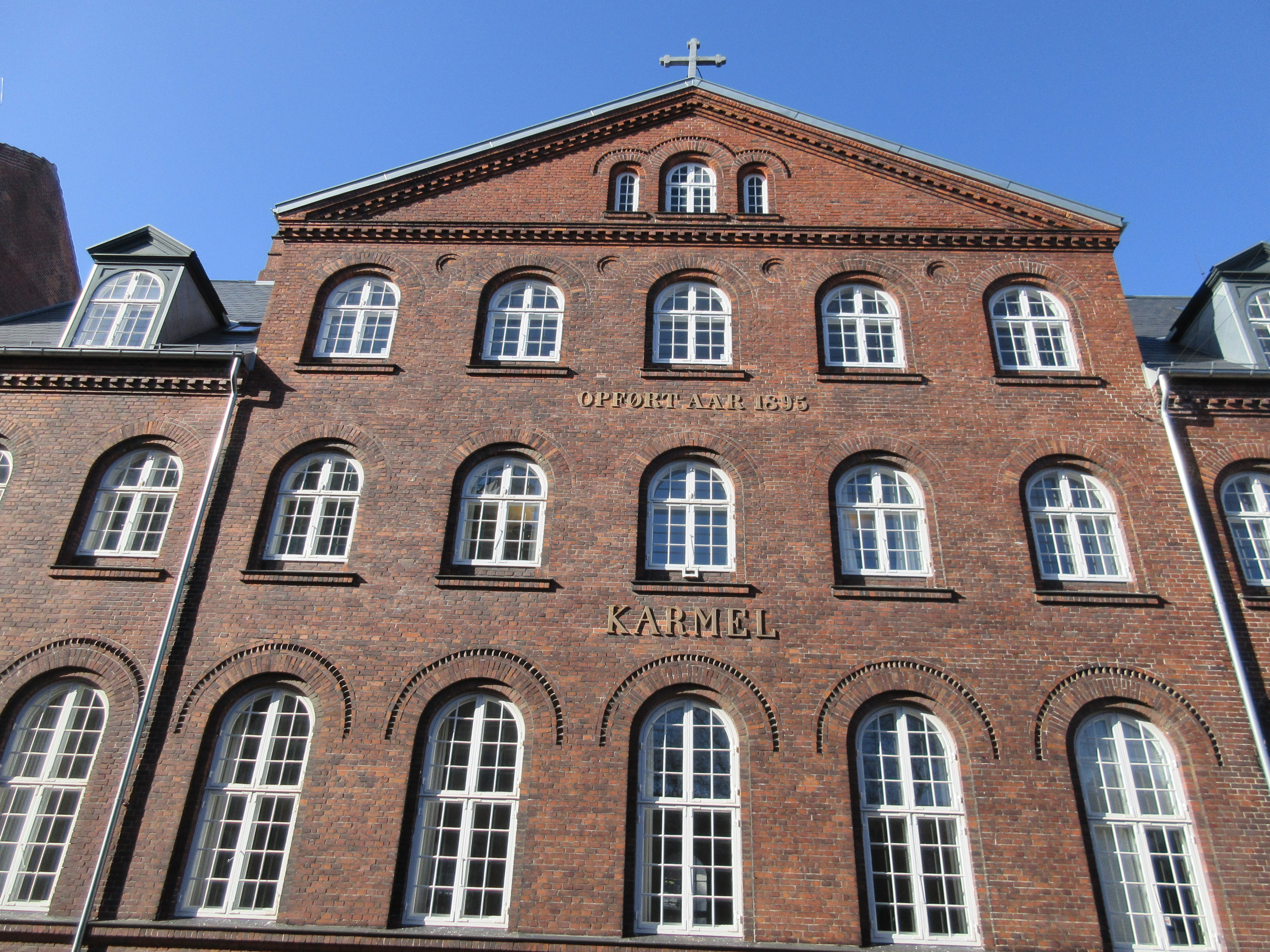
Menighedshuset Karmel at Vedbækgade 12

The church is built in red brick. It is 35 metres long and 14 metres wide. The tower stands 31 metres tall. It consists of an apsis, chancel and a long nave, terminating in a tower at the western end. Flanking the nave, there are large wooden galleries, supported by wooden pillars.

The artist Johannes Kragh created a series of 20 new church windows for the church in connection with its 50 years anniversary in 1934. Each of the windows depict a figure with a glory, holding another glory ready for the one who will follow.

== Furnishings ==
=== Altarpiece ===
The altarpiece was painted by Anton Dorph and features Jesus visiting the sisters Martha and Maria. Two sisters named Dorph Petersen from Blågårds posed for the work. Martha and Maria are depicted on six of the 71 altarpieces that Dorphs has painted for Danish churches. The oldest is in Tyrstrup Church at Haderslev and the one in St. Stephen's is the second oldest.

=== Pulpit ===
The pulpit from 1874 was originally decorated with four allegorical paintings representing Faith, Hope, Love and Justice. In connection with the 25 year anniversary of the church, it was renovated with by Johan N. Schrøder with new painting and gilding. He added a fifth, painting, depicting Jesus with the lamb, in addition to restoring the four original ones. In 1984, when the church was refurbished in connection with its 100 years anniversary, the pulpit was lowered and moved closer to the chancel.

=== Font ===
The font is made of marble from Greenland.

=== Organ ===
The current organ was built by Carsten Lund in 1983. He was given free hands by the congregation council, resulting in an eather unorthodox instrument equipped with 25 stops spread over 3 manuals and pedals. It is equal-tempered à la 1750. The standard organ stops are supplemented by special unpitched stops imitated the nightingale (a pipe submerged in a small pool of water, creating the sound of a bird warbling when wind is admitted) and the Standard orchestral percussion instruments bass drum, chimes and cymbal.

=== Votive ship ===
In 1882, Skifter Andersen, a model ship builder from Aabenraa, presented the votive ship St. Stefan to the church and it was installed in the nave the following year. The masts and rigging were installed by helmsmen S. C. Ibsen and Th. Knudsen. The haul was by Andersen used as a model for the ship Heinrich Augusta which he constructed for a trading house in Hamburg.
