= Ludvig Knudsen =

Danish architect

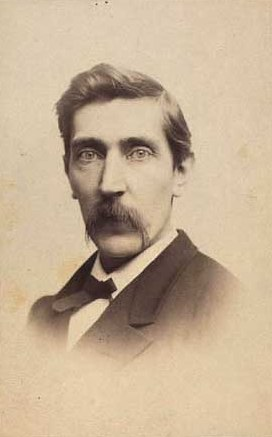
- Born: 18 August 1843; Copenhagen, Denmark
- Died: 16 March 1924 (aged 80); Copenhagen, Denmark
- Occupation: Architect
- Buildings: St. Stephen's Church, Copenhagen

Ludvig Harald Knudsen (18 August 1843 – 16 March 1924) was a Historicist Danish architect. He mainly designed churches.

== Biography ==
Ludvig Knudsen was born in Copenhagen. He was the son of Jens Christian Knudsen (1801-1856) and Johanne F. Jakobsen (1811-1866).

He apprenticed as a carpenter and was then admitted to the Royal Danish Academy of Fine Arts in 1860 where he studied under Gustav Friedrich Hetsch. After his graduation in 1869, he worked for both Christian Hansen and Ferdinand Meldahl. In 1871 he assumed a position as Building Inspector in Copenhagen and remained in this position until 1889.

He designed a number of churches as well as various other sacral buildings, including St. Stephen's Church (Sankt Stefans Kirke) in Copenhagen's Nørrebro district. He was also responsible for the restoration of the Reformed Church and the Garrison Church in Copenhagen.

He became Knight of in the Order of the Dannebrog 1887 and titular professor 1900. Knudsen died in Copenhagen and was buried at Vestre Kirkegård.

== Selected buildings ==
- St. Andrew's Church, Ordrup, Denmark (1871–72)
- St. Stephen's Church, Nørrebro, Copenhagen (1873–74)
- Royal Orphanage, Copenhagen (1879–80)
- Mission House Bethesda at Israels Plads, Copenhagen (1881–82)
- St. Clement's Church, Bornholm, Denmark (1881–82)
- Shooting Range Wall, Royal Copenhagen Shooting Society, Copenhagen (1887)
- Church of Peace, Nørrebro, Copenhagen (1899)
- Rungsted Church, Rungsted, Denmark (1905–07)

== Gallery ==
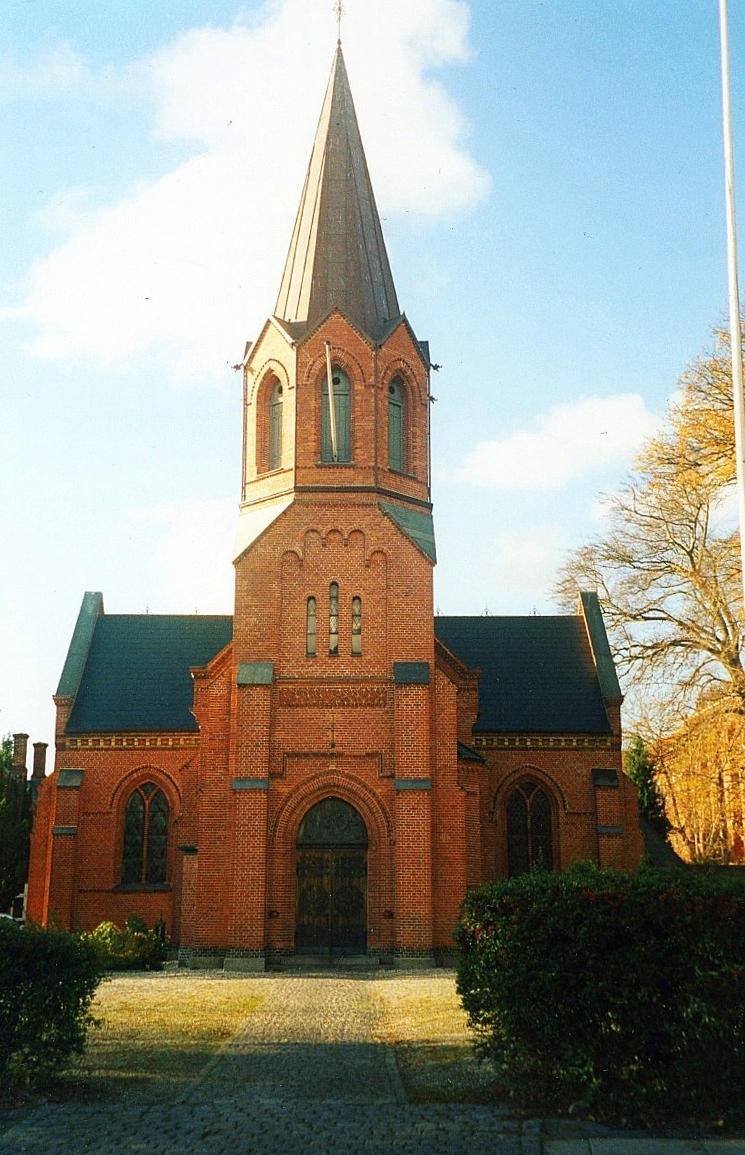
St. Andrew's Church, Ordrup (1872)

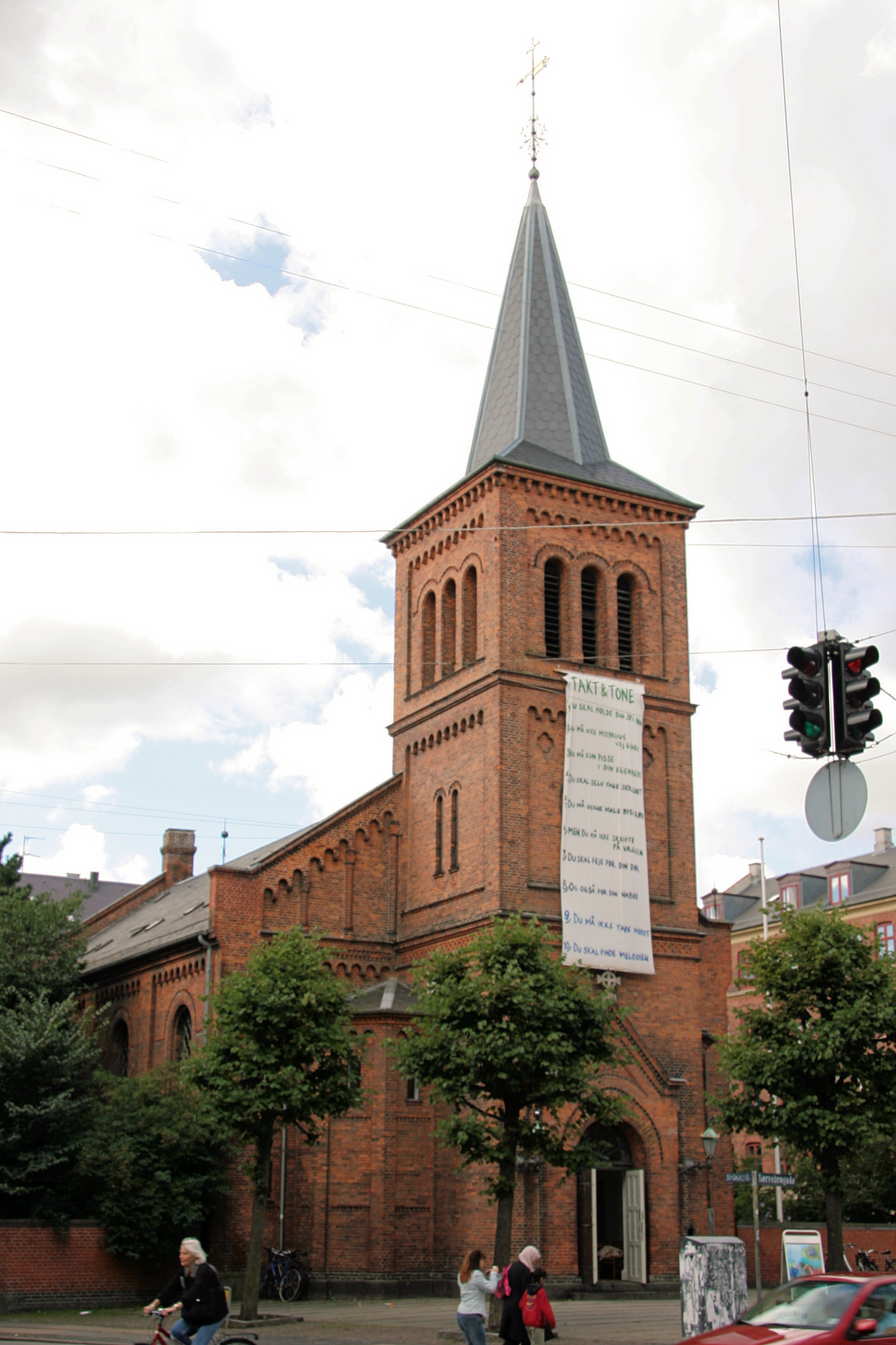
St. Stephen's Church, Nørrebro (1874)

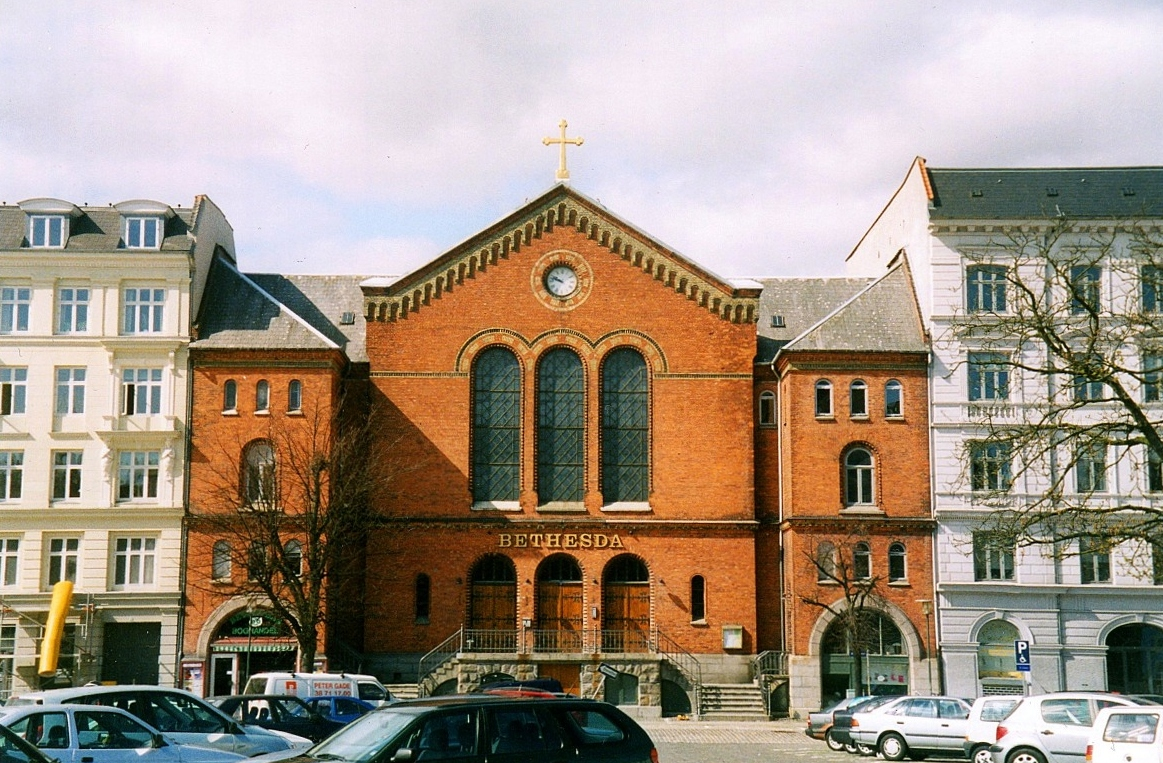
Mission House Bethesda, Copenhagen (1882)

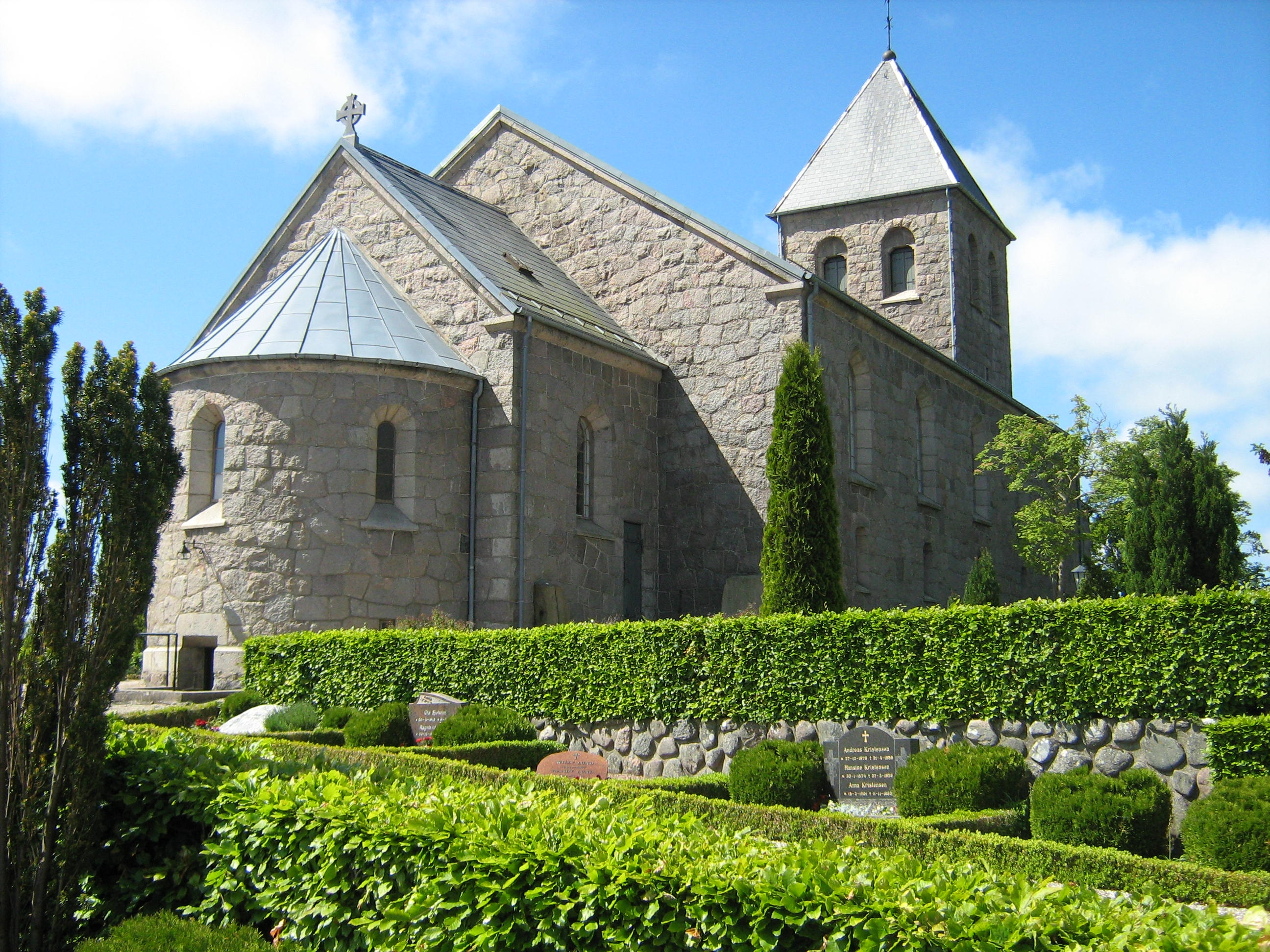
St. Clement's Church, Bornholm (1882)

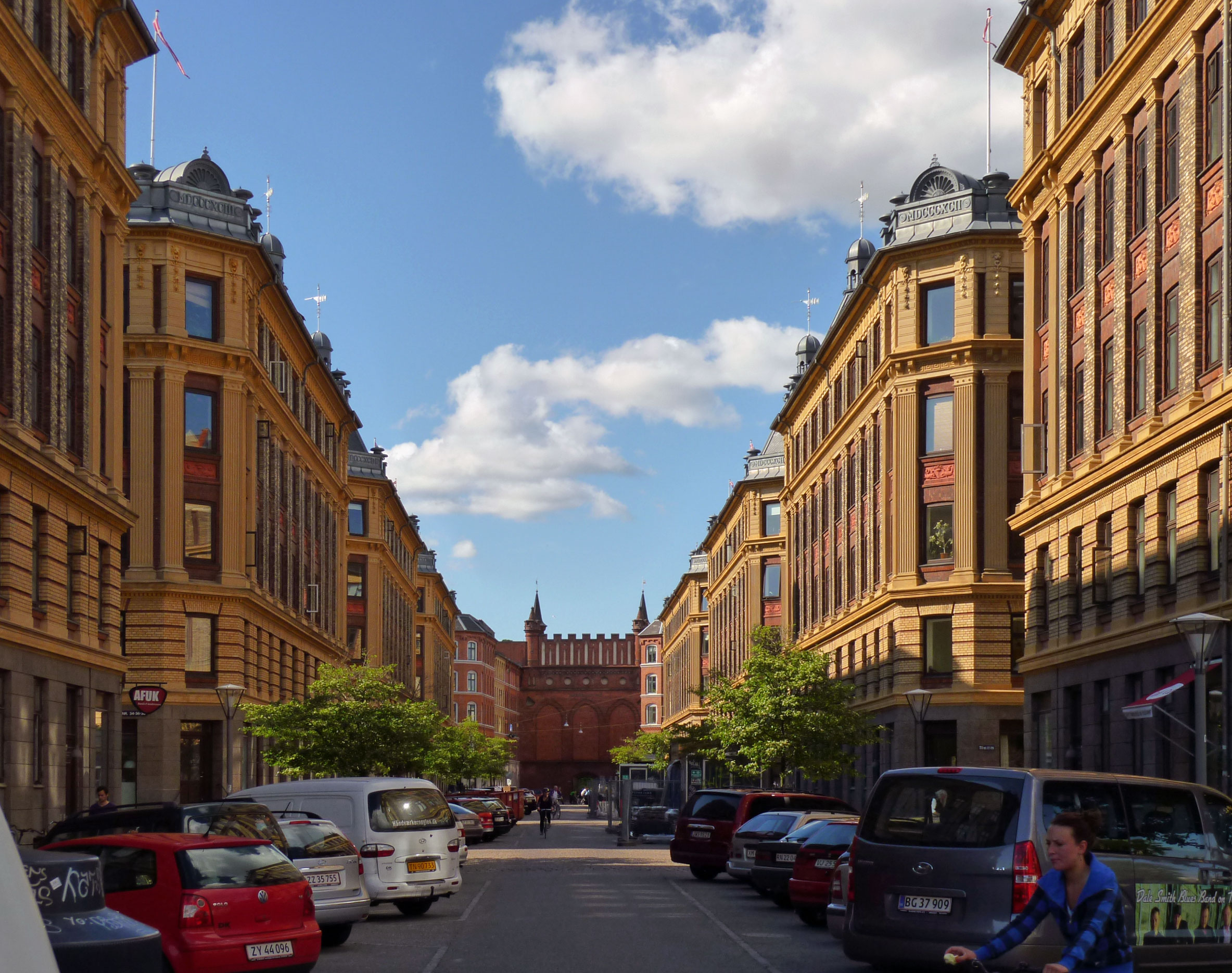
The Shooting Range Wall, Copenhagen (1887)

== See also ==
- Architecture of Denmark
