= Royal Copenhagen Shooting Society =

Danish shooting organization

- Formation: Pre-1443
- Headquarters: Sølyst, Klampenborg; Copenhagen, Denmark
- Protector: HM Margrethe II of Denmark
- Website: www.soelyst.dk

The Royal Copenhagen Shooting Society (Danish: Kongelige Kjøbenhavnske Skydeselskab og danske Broderskab) was founded some time before 1443 in Copenhagen, Denmark. Originally it served to train citizens to contribute to the defence of the city but by the 18th century its activities were of a purely ceremonial and social nature. Today it is based at the Sølyst estate north of the city.

== History ==
=== Early history ===
The first known reference to the Royal Copenhagen Shooting Society is from 1443. In the beginning it was involved with the training of citizens as part of the defence of the city but its activities had gradually become of a purely ceremonial and social nature. The society was based in the street Kompagnistræde, which was named after it, where No. 16 lies today.

=== Outside the Western City Gate ===
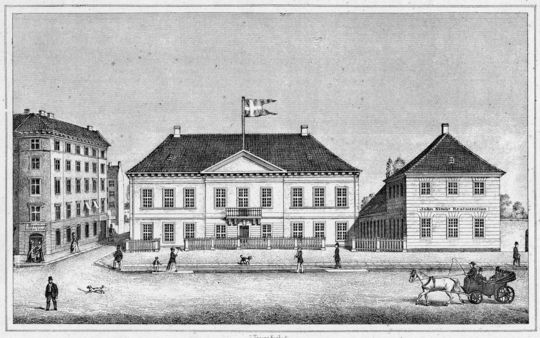
The Society's mansion outside the Western City Gate

Since the activities were hardly compatible with a location inside the fortified city, the society was granted royal permission to conduct the shooting training outside the city. This took place at various sites from 1619 and in the 1750s a permanent shooting range was established outside the Western City Gate.

In 1782 the society acquired a 3.5-hectare (8.6-acre) tract of land, stretching from present day Vesterbrogade to the beach. The same year the foundation stone was laid for a mansion which was to serve as a venue for the society's social activities but due to shortage of funds construction came to a standstill several times and the building was not completed until 1787.

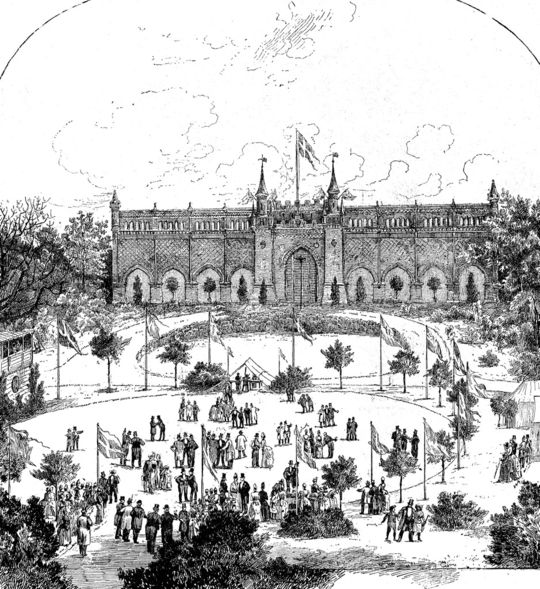
The shooting range with the Shooting Range Wall in the 1890s

When Vesterbro started to develop in the second half of the 19th century, after the city had been allowed to develop beyond its now decommissioned fortifications, the Royal Shooting Society once again found itself situated in urban surroundings. City authorities expropriated much of its grounds and in 1887, 100 years after the completion of its building, a tall wall was constructed to shield the newly established street Istedgade from stray bullets from the shooting range. The wall was built to the design of architect Ludvig Knudsen in a neo-gothic style. Ludvig Knudsen also modernized the interior of the Shooting Society's mansion in the 1890s and added a small new wing towards the gardens.

=== Post-World War II move to Sølyst ===
After World War II the Society moved to Sølyst Manor near Klampenborg north of Copenhagen, while Copenhagen Municipality acquired the old headquarters and ultimately turned the building into the Museum of Copenhagen.

== The society today ==
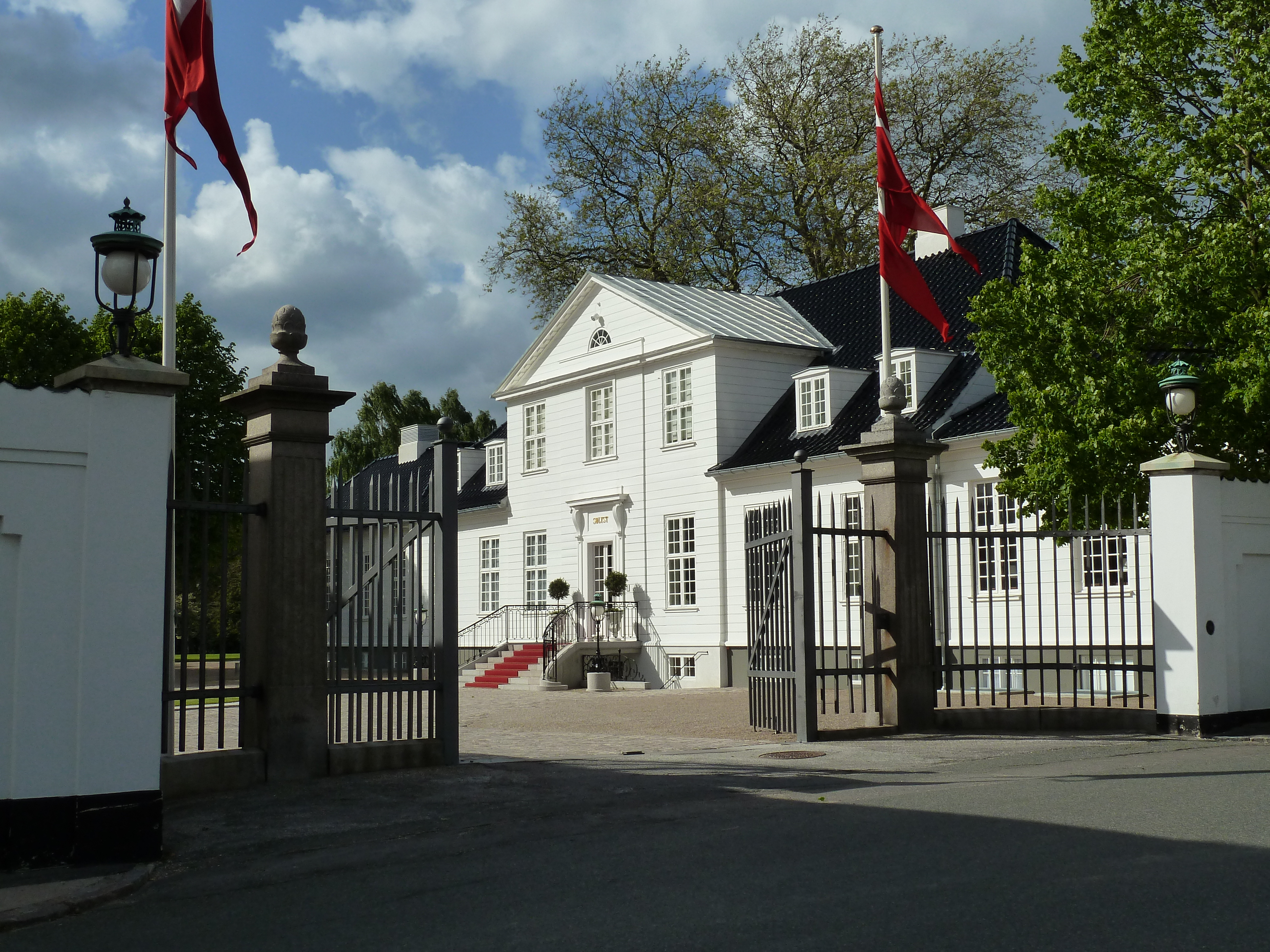
Sølyst today

As of 1997 the society had 138 members. Since the 16th century it has been a tradition that the Danish monarch is one of its members and this is also the case for Queen Margrethe II and Crown Prince Frederik. Most notably, the former United States Ambassador to Denmark, James P. Cain, is a member.
