= List of churches on Bornholm =

1: Christiansø 2: Allinge-Sandvig 3: Rutsker 4: Olsker 5: Rø 6: Gudhjem 7: Hasle 8: Klemensker 9: Østerlarsker 10: Nyker 11: Knudsker 12: Vestermarie 13: Østermarie 14: Ibsker 15: Svaneke 16: Rønne 17: Nylarsker 18: Aaker 19: Bodilsker 20: Nexø 21: Pedersker 22: Poulsker

This is a list of churches on the island of Bornholm in eastern Denmark.

== The list ==
| Name | Location | Year | Coordinates | Image | Refs |
|---|---|---|---|---|---|
| Aa Church | Aakirkeby | 1150 | 55°4′14.5″N 14°55′8.9″E | | |
| Allinge Church | Allinge | c. 1500 | 55°16′33.5″N 14°48′11″E | | |
| St. Bodil's Church | Bodilsker | c. 1200 | 55°3′42.84″N 15°4′22.08″E | | |
| Christiansø Church | Christiansø | 1821 | 55°19′17″N 15°11′13″E | | |
| St. Clement's Church | Klemensker | 1882 | 55°10′30.5″N 14°48′10″E | | |
| Gudhjem Church | Gudhjem | 1893 | 55°12′39″N 14°58′18.3″E | | |
| Hasle Church | Hasle | c. 1450 | 55°11′05.5″N 14°42′29″E | | |
| St. Ib's Church | Ibsker | c. 1175 | 55°7′1.5″N 15°6′17.03″E | | |
| St. Canute's Church | Knudsker | c. 1150 | 55°6′25.19″N 14°45′7.2″E | | |
| Nexø Church | Nexø | c. 1400 | 55°3′38″N 15°7′56″E | | |
| St. Nicolas' Church | Rønne | c. 1275 | 55°05′56″N 14°41′52″E | | |
| Nyker Church | Nyker | c. 1150 | 55°8′21.7″N 14°46′8.3″E | | |
| Nylars Church | Nylars | 12th century | 55°4′26.4″N 14°48′53.5″E | | |
| St. Ol's Church | Olsker | 12th century | 55°14′09.5″N 14°48′01.5″E | | |
| St. Paul's Church | Poulsker | c. 1250 | 55°1′21.72″N 15°2′25.08″E | | |
| Tejn Church | Tejn | 1940 | 55°14′43.79″N 14°50′6.36″E | | |
| St. Peter's Church | Pedersker | c. 1150 | 55°1′36.15″N 14°58′35.23″E | | |
| Ruth's Church | Rutsker | c. 1200 | 55°12′54.9″N 14°45′0.7″E | | |
| Rø Church | Rø | 1888 | 55°12′38″N 14°53′46″E | | |
| Svaneke Church | Svaneke | c. 1350 | 55°12′54.9″N 14°45′0.7″E | | |
| Vestermarie Church | Vestermarie | 1885 | 55°8′3.26″N 15°8′32.44″E | | |
| Østerlars Church | Østerlars | c. 1150 | 55°10′17.5″N 14°57′42″E | | |
| Østermarie Church | Østermarie | 1891 | 55°08′24″N 15°02′50″E | | |

== See also ==
- Diocese of Copenhagen
- List of windmills on Bornholm
