= Svaneke Church =

Coordinates: 55°05′56″N 14°41′52″E

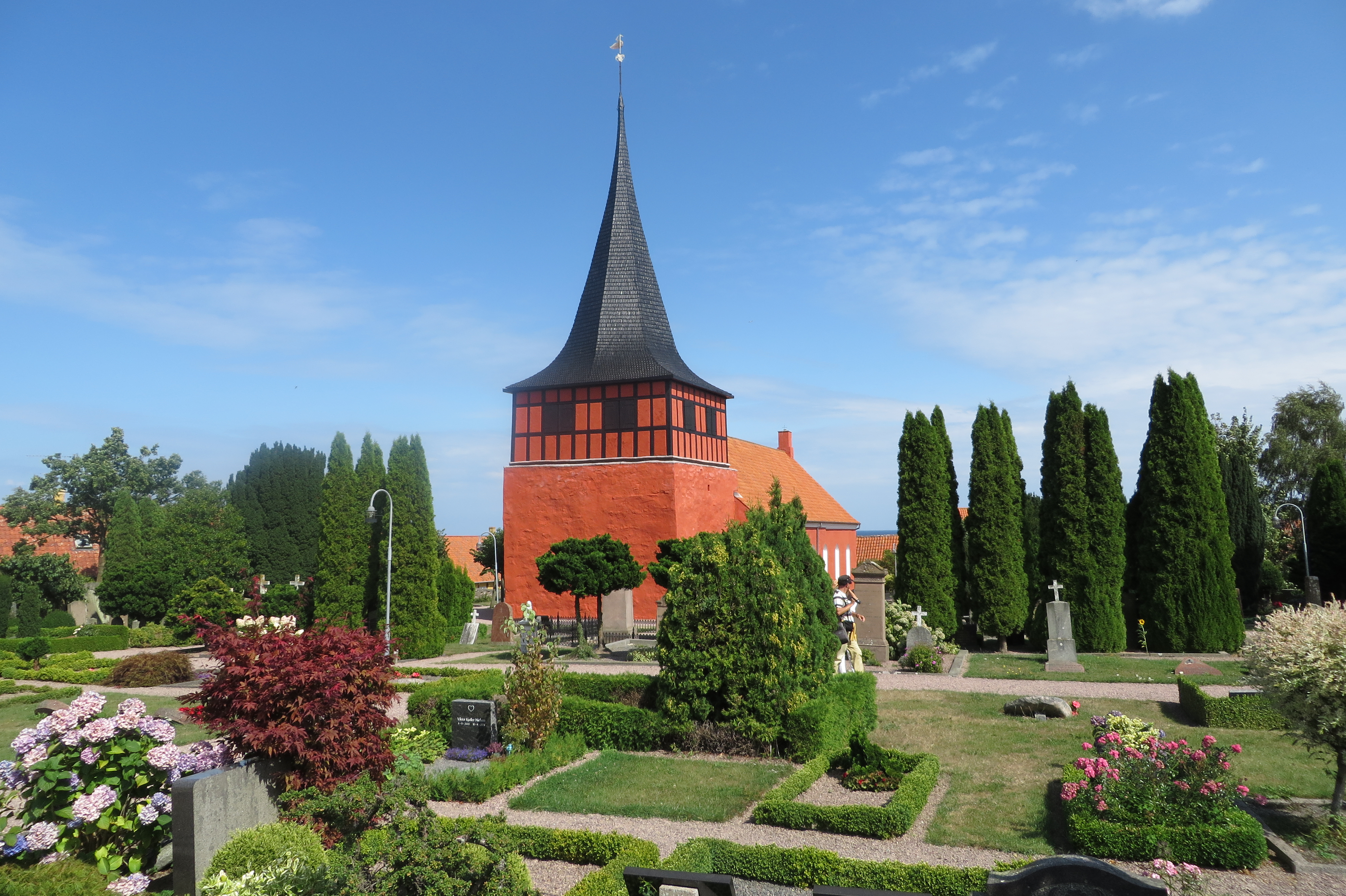
Svaneke Church, Bornholm

Svaneke Church is located in the small town of Svaneke on the Danish island of Bornholm. It stands above the harbour at a height of 18 metres on the site of a small chapel which appears to have existed for quite some time before the town received its charter in the 16th century. The church was expanded over the years, the tower and spire being completed in 1789. In 1881, virtually the whole building was rebuilt by architect Mathias Bidstrup of Rønne, leaving only the tower and a small section of the south wall.

== History ==
In 1569, the church was referred to as the chapel of Svaneke. With the Reformation, it moved from the Archbishopric of Lund to the Danish crown but is now self-governing. It was initially annexed to nearby St Ib's Church.

== Architecture ==
The church was renovated and extended in 1881, leaving only the nave's late Gothic southern wall, the western gable and the lower floor of the more recent tower. The older stonework was built of granite. There are traces of the old porch which was demolished in 1837. The tower, also built of granite, was probably built during the 16th century. The belfry is of half-timbered oak finished in red brick. Today's octagonal spire, dating from 1789, still stands today although it had to be repaired in 1905 after being struck by lightning.

In 1881, under the direction of Mathias Bidstrup, the church was expanded and renovated. The northern and easters walls of the nave were demolished and the church was extended to the east, ending in an apse. These alterations were completed in brick. Large arched windows and a new ceiling were installed. As today, the exterior was finished in red-washed walls. The weather vane on the tower depicts a swan, representing the arms of the town.

== Artefacts and furnishings ==
The Baroque-styled pulpit is from 1683. The current organ was installed in 1955. The church now has seating for 300. The wooden altar dates from the 1881 restoration while the carved altarpiece contains a painting from 1882 signed by A. Dorph. The old chandelier dates from 1673 while the church bell from 1701, displaying an image of a swan, was cast by Daniel Hinrich Grædener and Arendt Torkuhl.

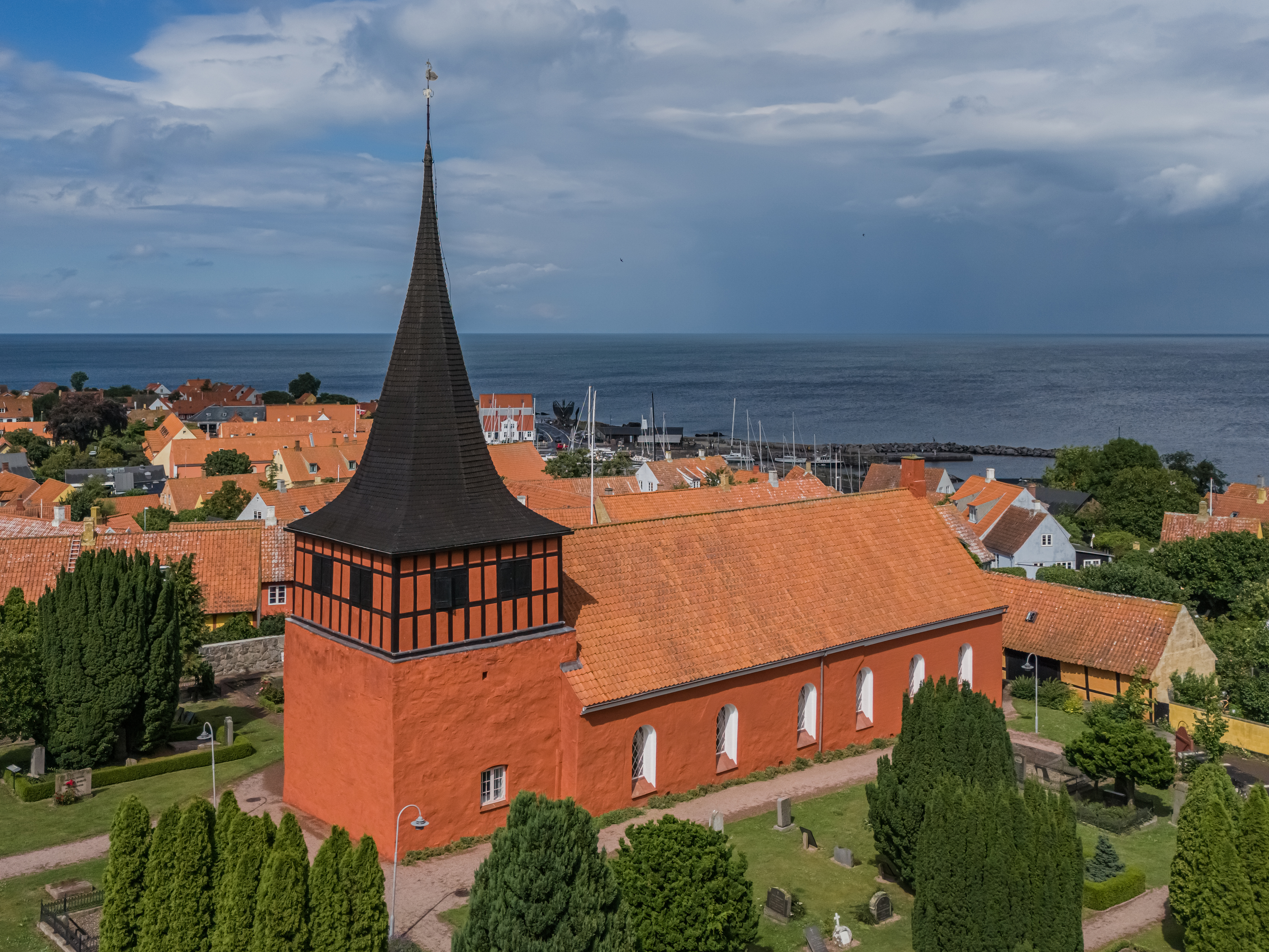
Aerial view

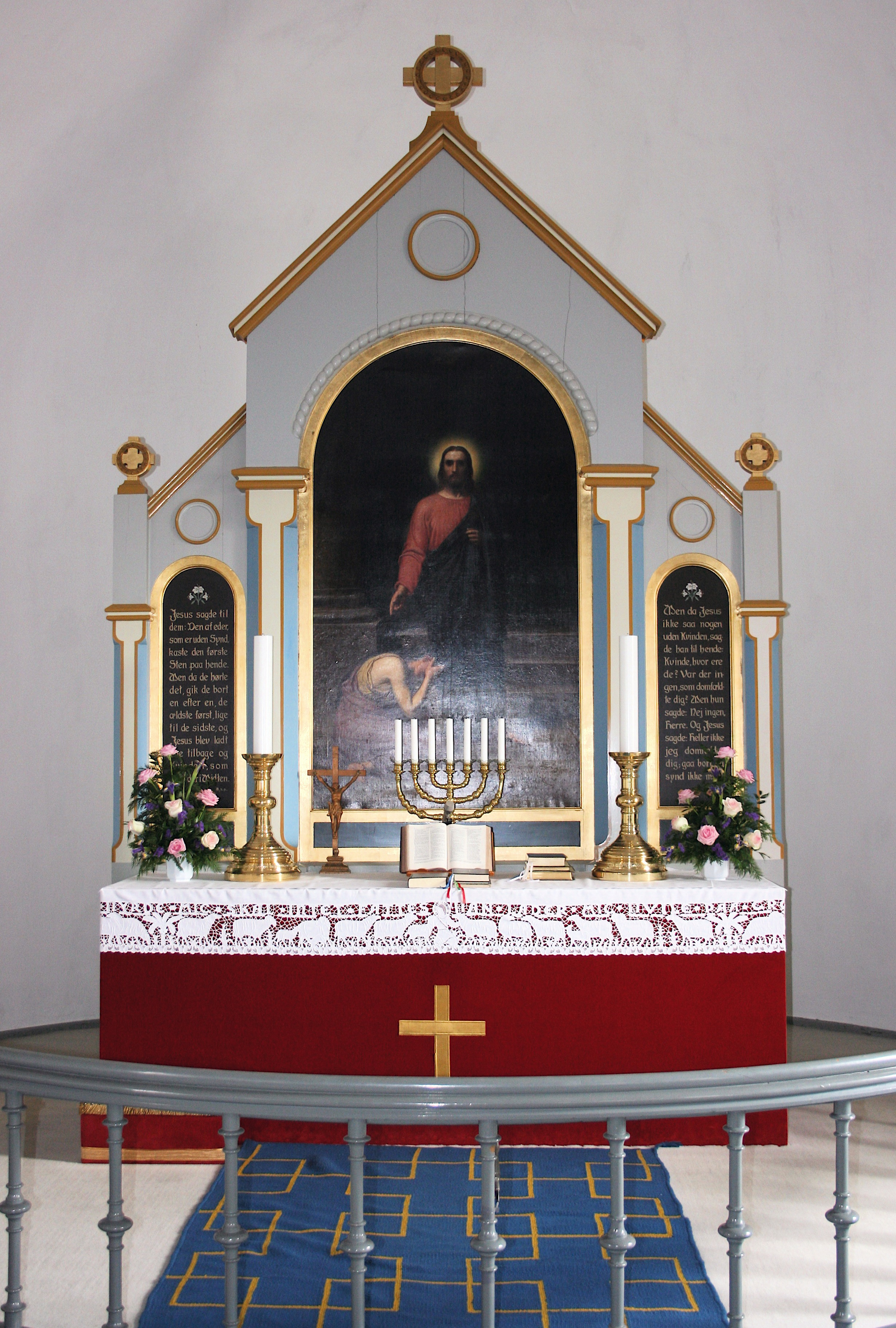
Altar

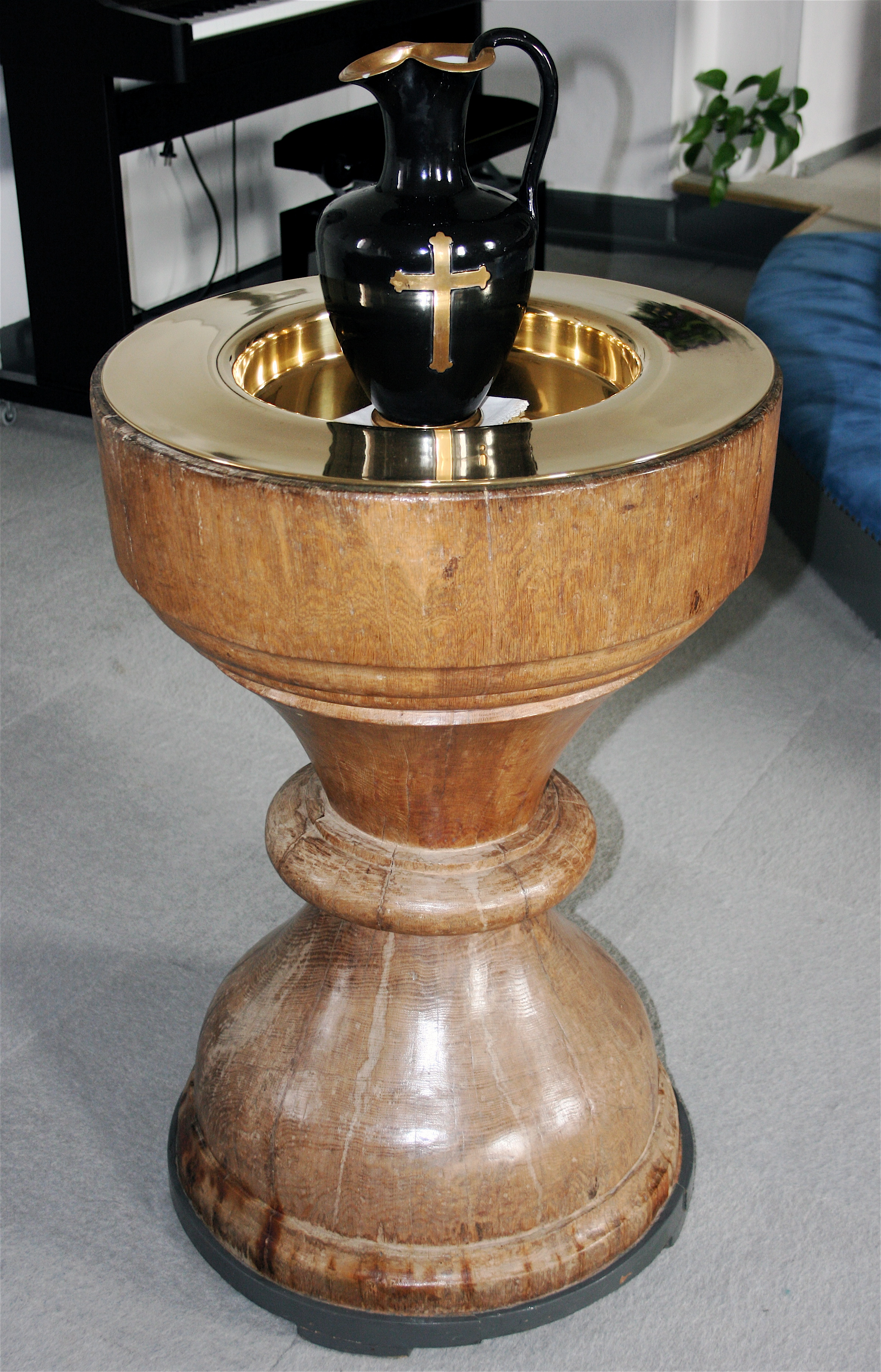
Font

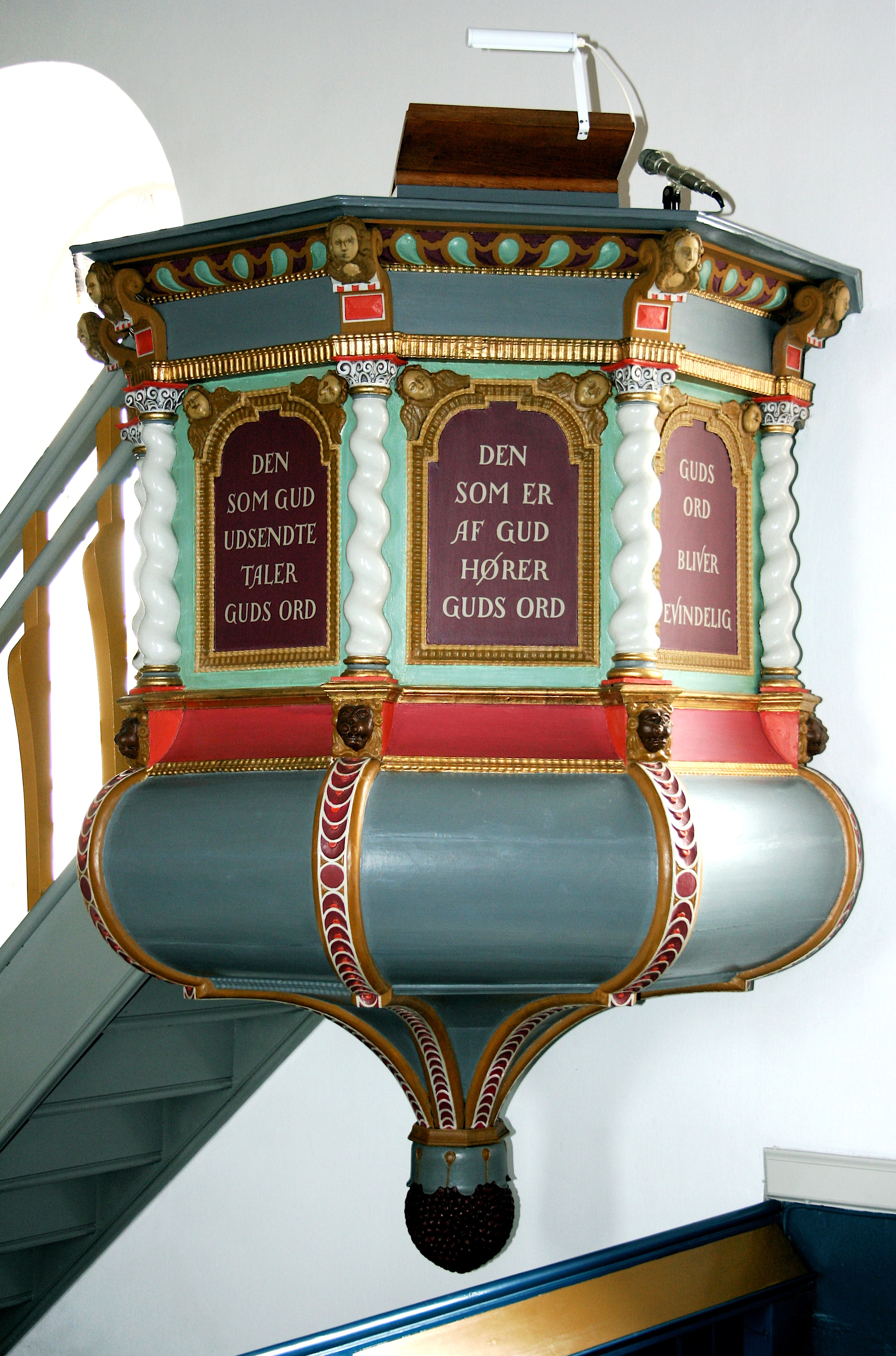
Pulpit

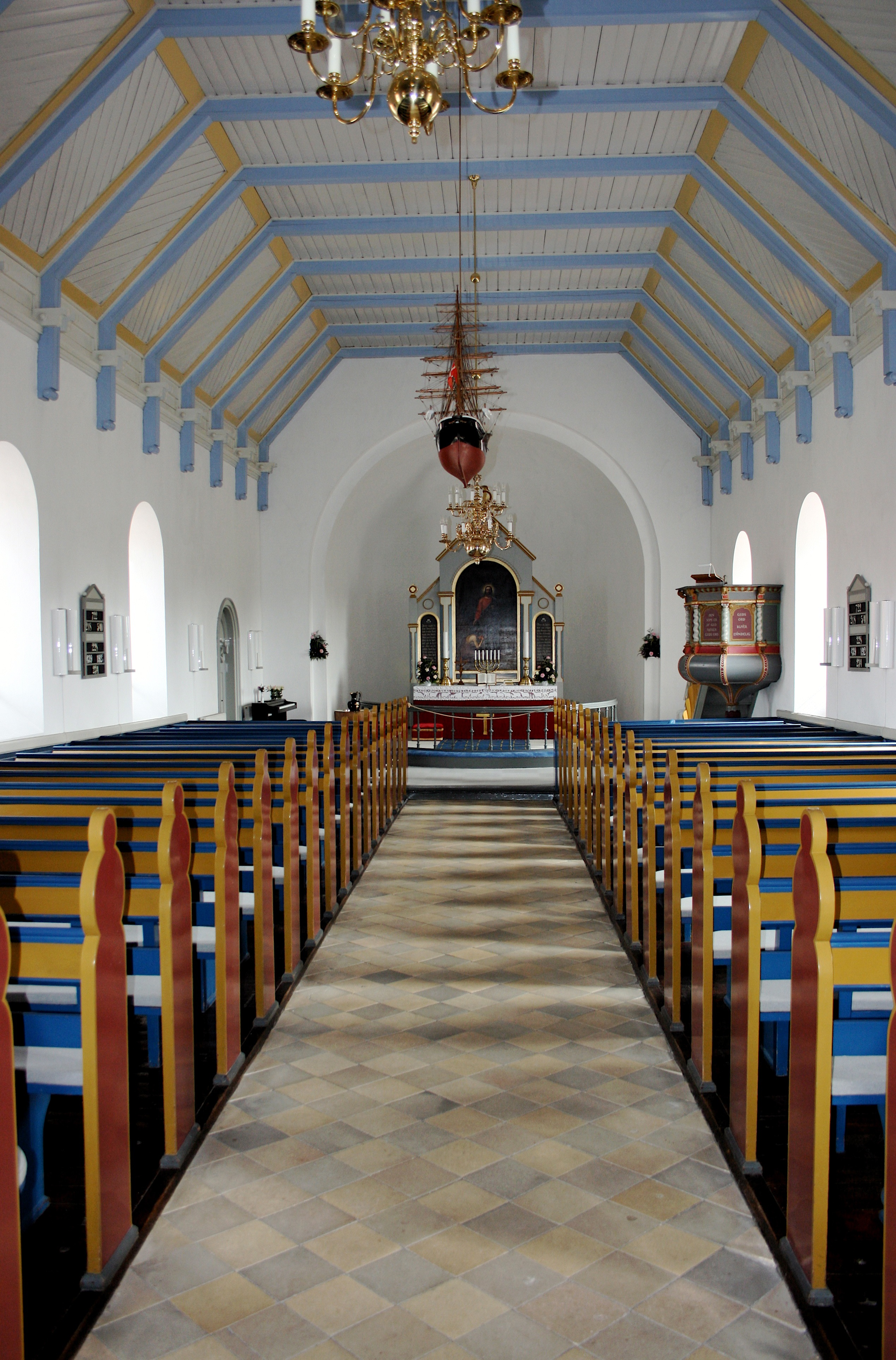
Interior

== See also ==
- List of churches on Bornholm
