= St. Peter's Church, Bornholm =

Church in Bornholm, Denmark

Coordinates: 55.025079°N 14.976527°E

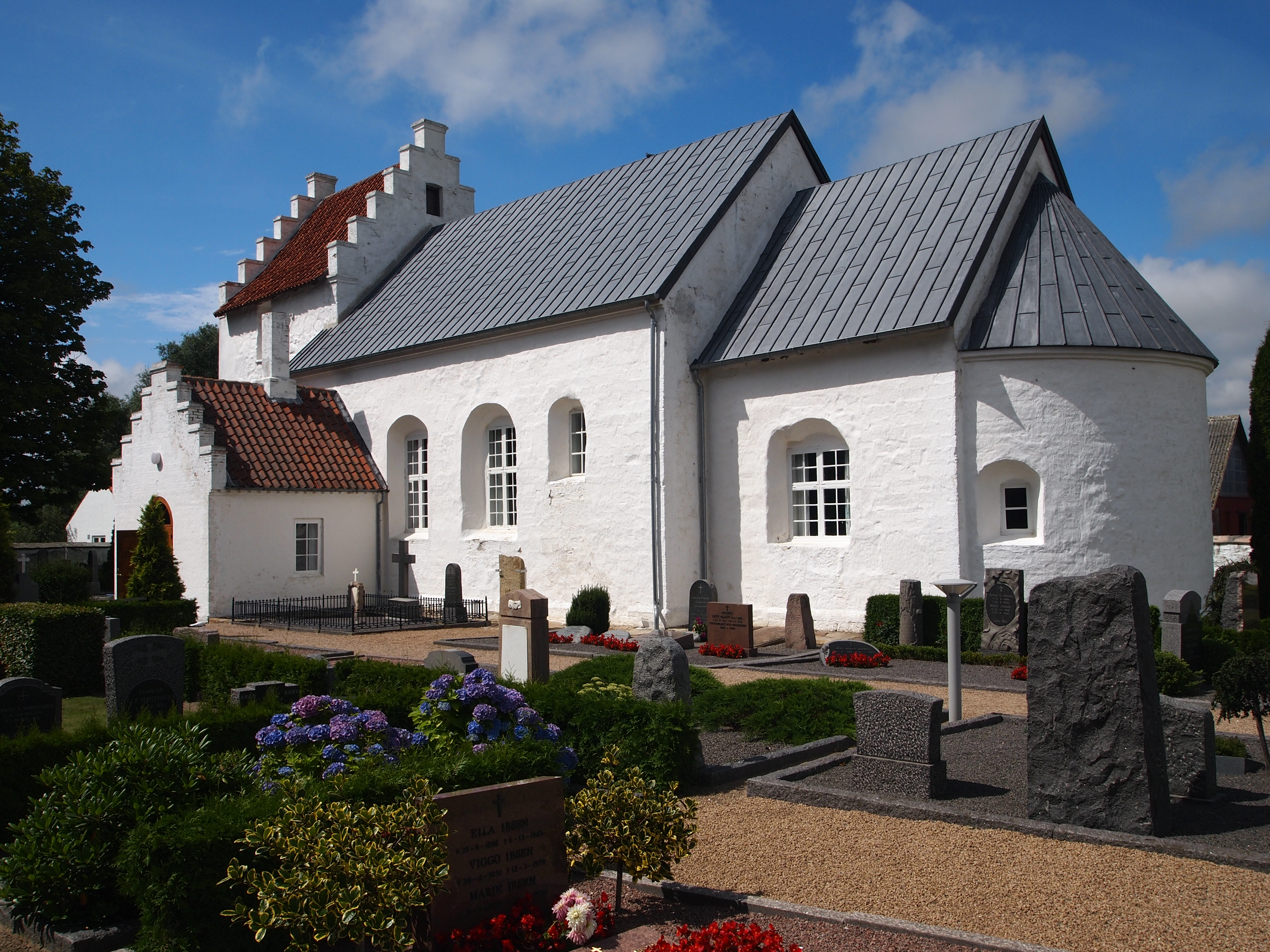
St. Peter's Church, Bornholm

St. Peter's Church (Danish: Sankt Peders Kirke) is a Romanesque parish church some 6 km east of Aakirkeby on the Danish island of Bornholm. It is thought to be the oldest church on the island.

== History ==
The church is thought to be the oldest on Bornholm, dating from the 10th or the 11th century. The earliest written reference was in 1429. There are indications that the chancel is the oldest part of the building and that it probably stood alone for a period.

== Architecture ==
The building consists of a Romanesque nave, chancel, and apse, all in local limestone. The unimpressive fieldstone tower at the western end of the nave was probably added in the late 16th century, although it is first mentioned in 1624. The porch on the south side was completed in 1864, doubtless on the site of an earlier Romanesque structure. There are traces of earlier windows in the apse and chancel, although they have now been bricked up. The nave originally had two windows on either side, but that at the northwestern end is the only one that still exists.

== Furnishings ==
Apart from the font, which was made in Gotland in the late Romanesque period (c. 1575), the furnishings are relatively recent. The altar was rebricked in 1854 and decorated with an altarpiece from 1876 with a painting by C. Christian Andersen of Christ and the Canaanite Woman. The simple pulpit is the work of Anders Jensen (1845). The organ from 1968 was built by Frobenius.

== See also ==
- List of churches on Bornholm
