= St. Canute's Church, Bornholm =

Church building in Denmark

Coordinates: 55.106879°N 14.751978°E

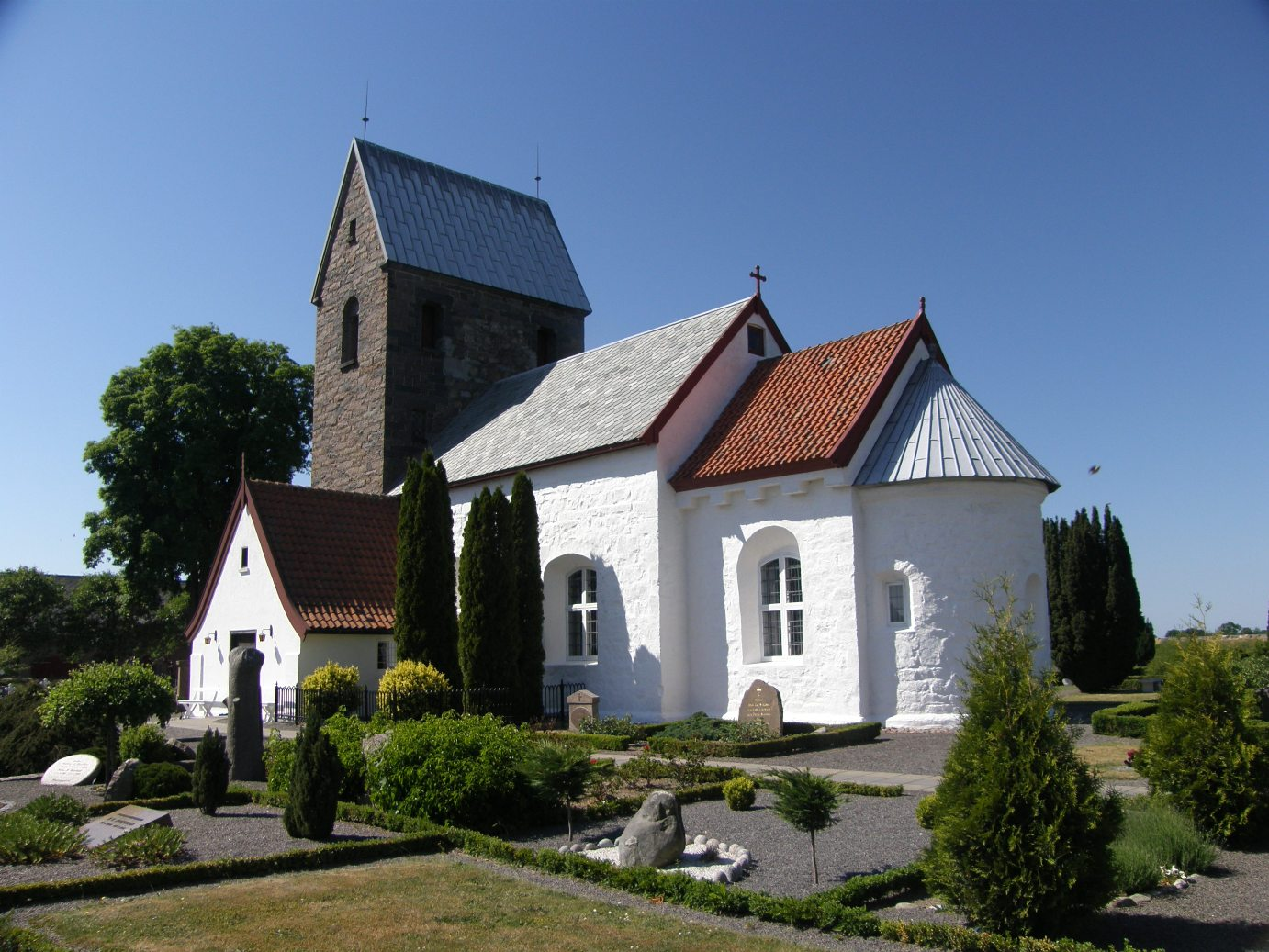
St. Canute's Church, Bornholm

St. Canute's Church (Danish: Sankt Knuds Kirke) is a Romanesque church located 3 kilometres (1.9 mi) northeast of Rønne on the Danish island of Bornholm.

== History ==
The church is named after King Canute IV (1042–1086) who was canonized in 1101. The church was probably built between 1150 and 1200. The west tower and the southern porch were extended in 1878. The nave walls were heightened, probably first in 1631 and then in 1906 in connection with the renewal of the roof. St Canute's is the smallest of the Romanesque churches on Bornholm.

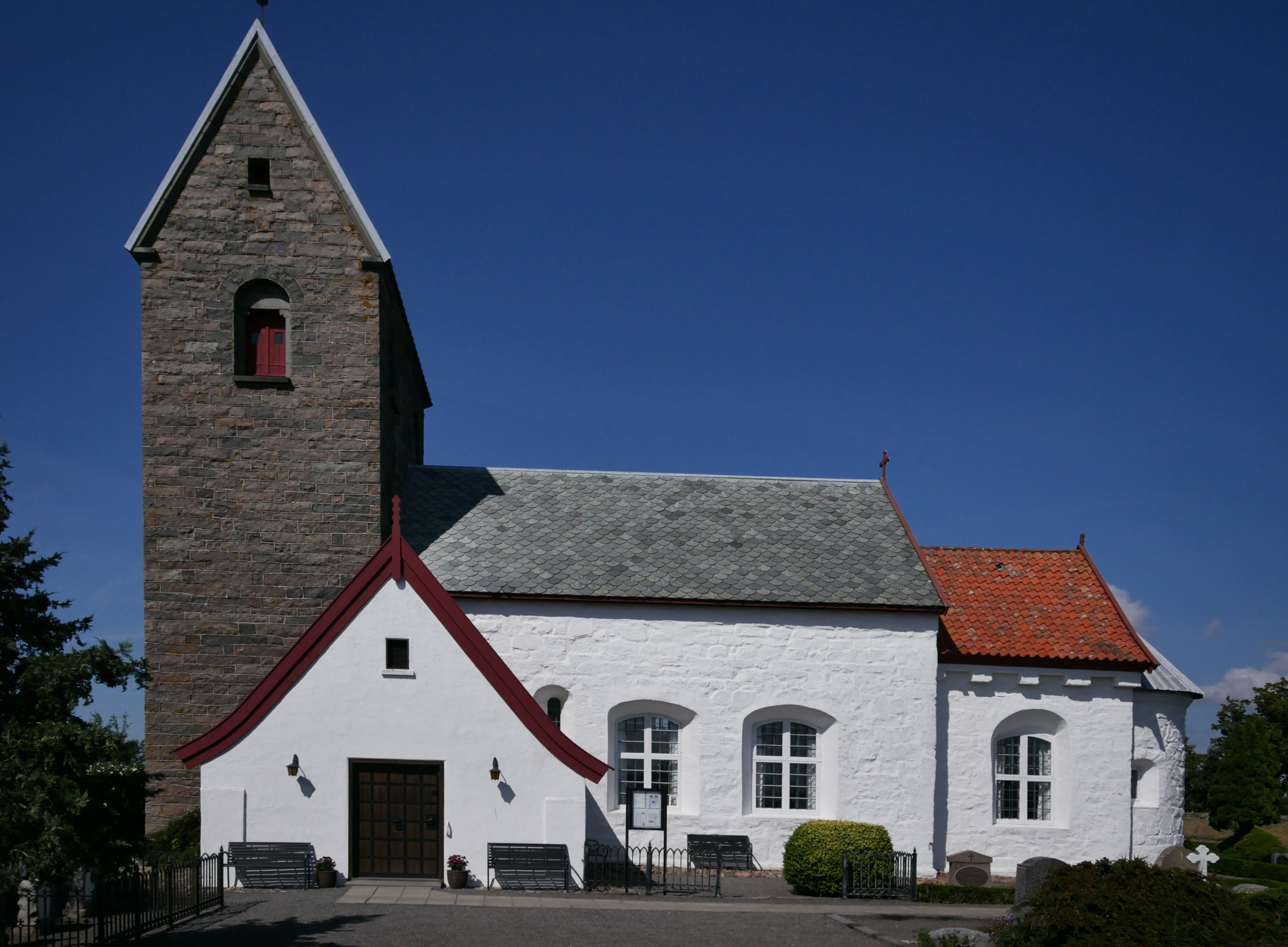
from the south

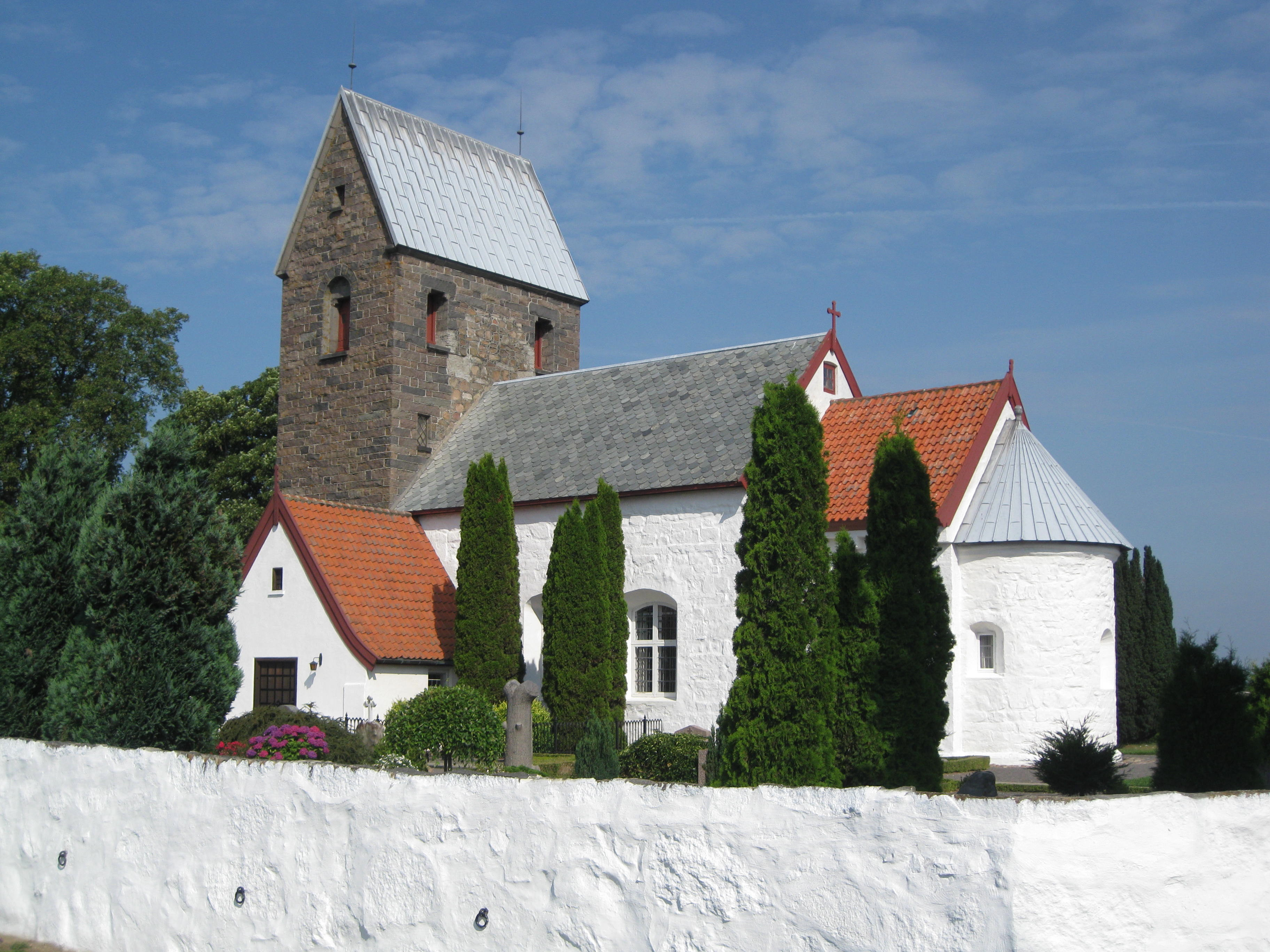
from the south east

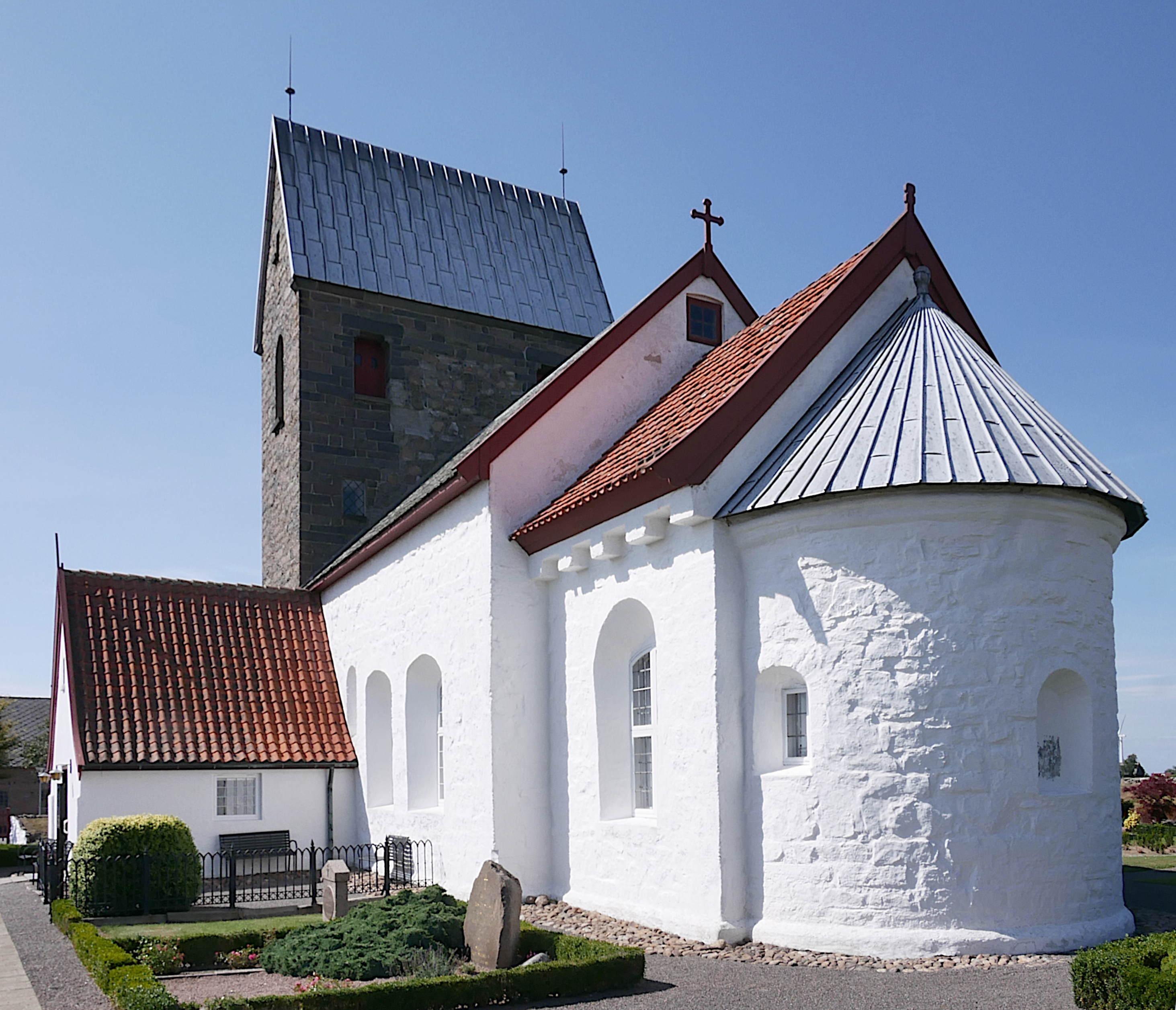
from the south east

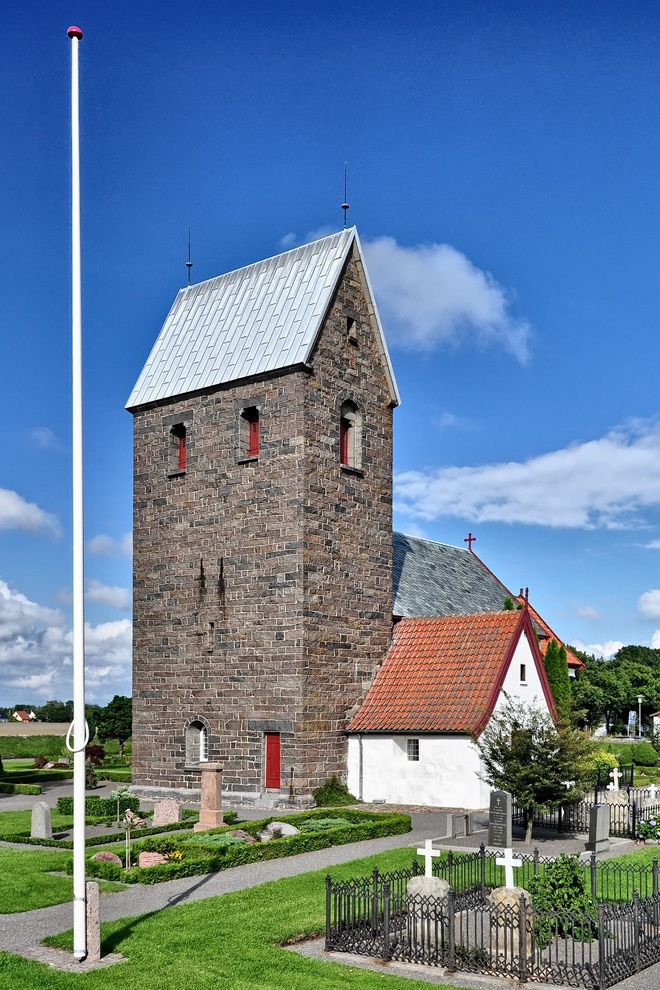
tower

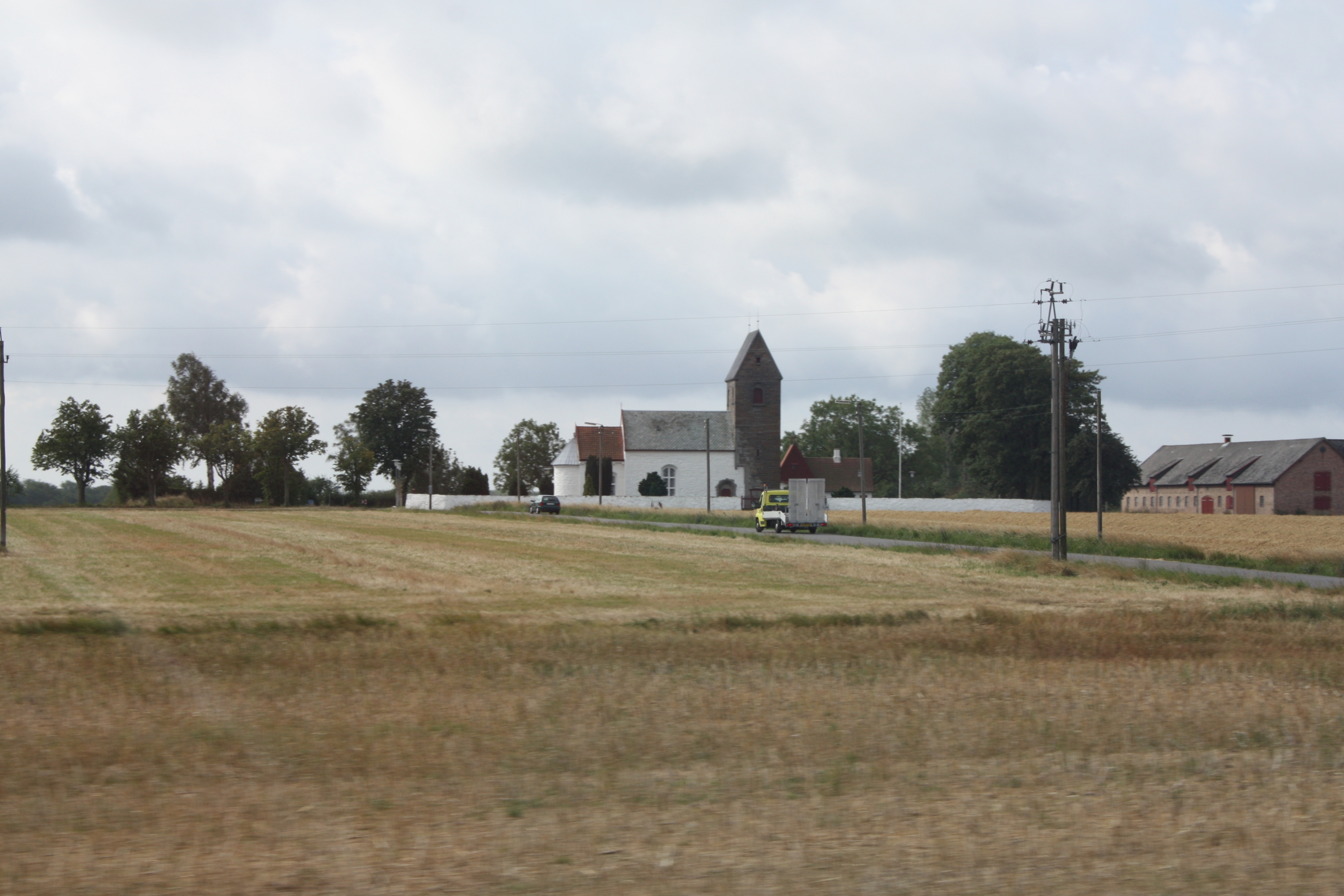
from the north

== Architecture ==
Built in the Romanesque style, the church consists of a nave, chancel, apse and a tower. There were originally two entrances, one for women on the north side (now bricked up) and the one to the south which still exists. Various construction materials were used, mainly fieldstone, while the doors and windows were bordered with limestone. Originally the apse probably had only one window, the remains of which can be seen on the outer wall. The once small windows in the chancel have now been replaced by large modern windows. The impressive cornices were probably used to support a stone roof for the chancel. The original height of the upright nave appears to have been some 4.6 metres (15 ft) but it has now been heightened to 5.8 metres (19 ft).

== Furnishings ==
The Romanesque granite font has been sculpted from two stones. The Renaissance altarpiece from 1596 contains pictures of Isaac's sacrifice and Christ's crucifixion. The original decoration from 1762 was restored in 1978. The pulpit, also from 1762, is decorated with the Four Evangelists surrounded by five caryatids depicting human-like figures made up of fruit and grapes. The Frobenius organ was installed in 1955.

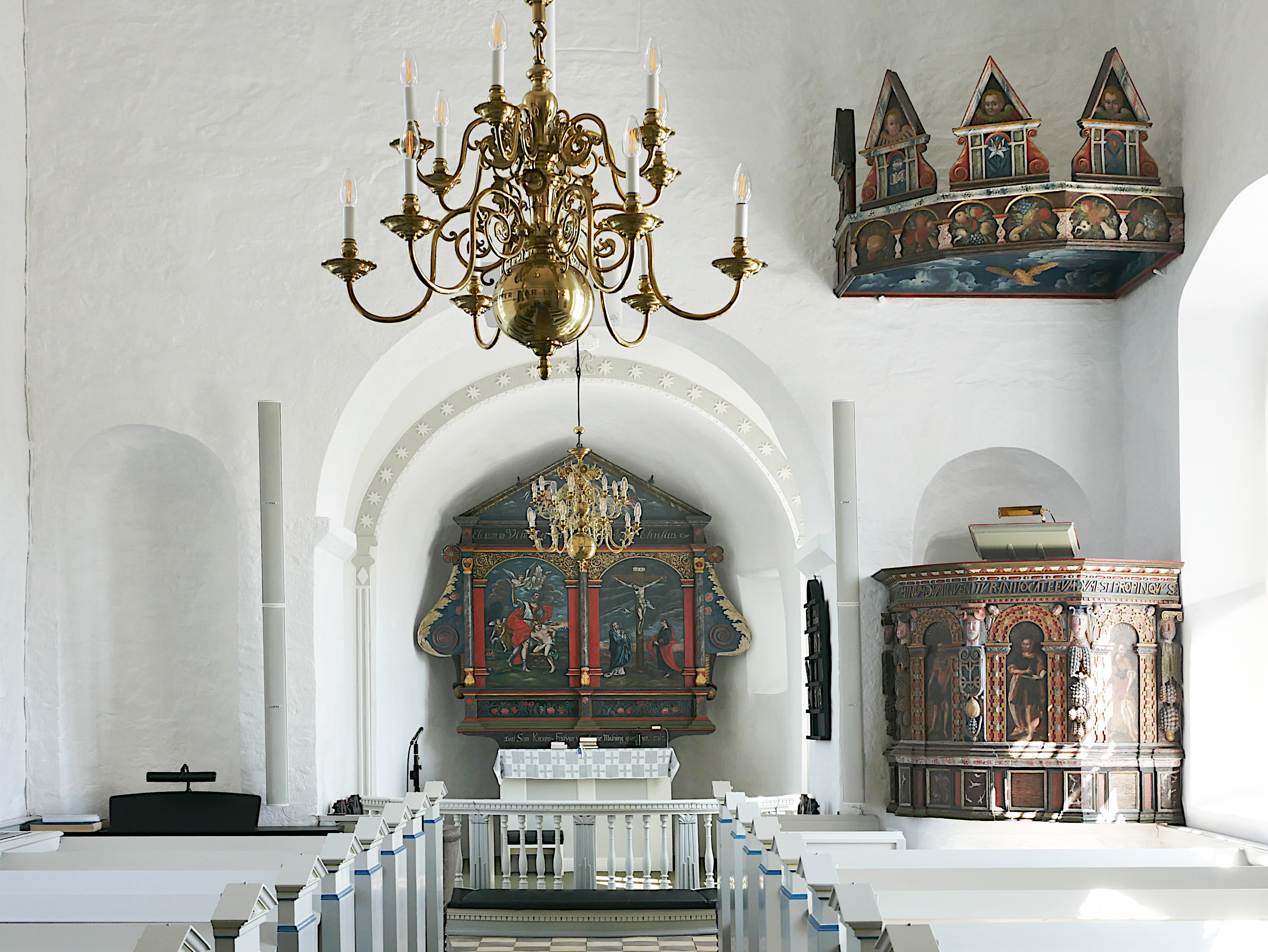
Nave

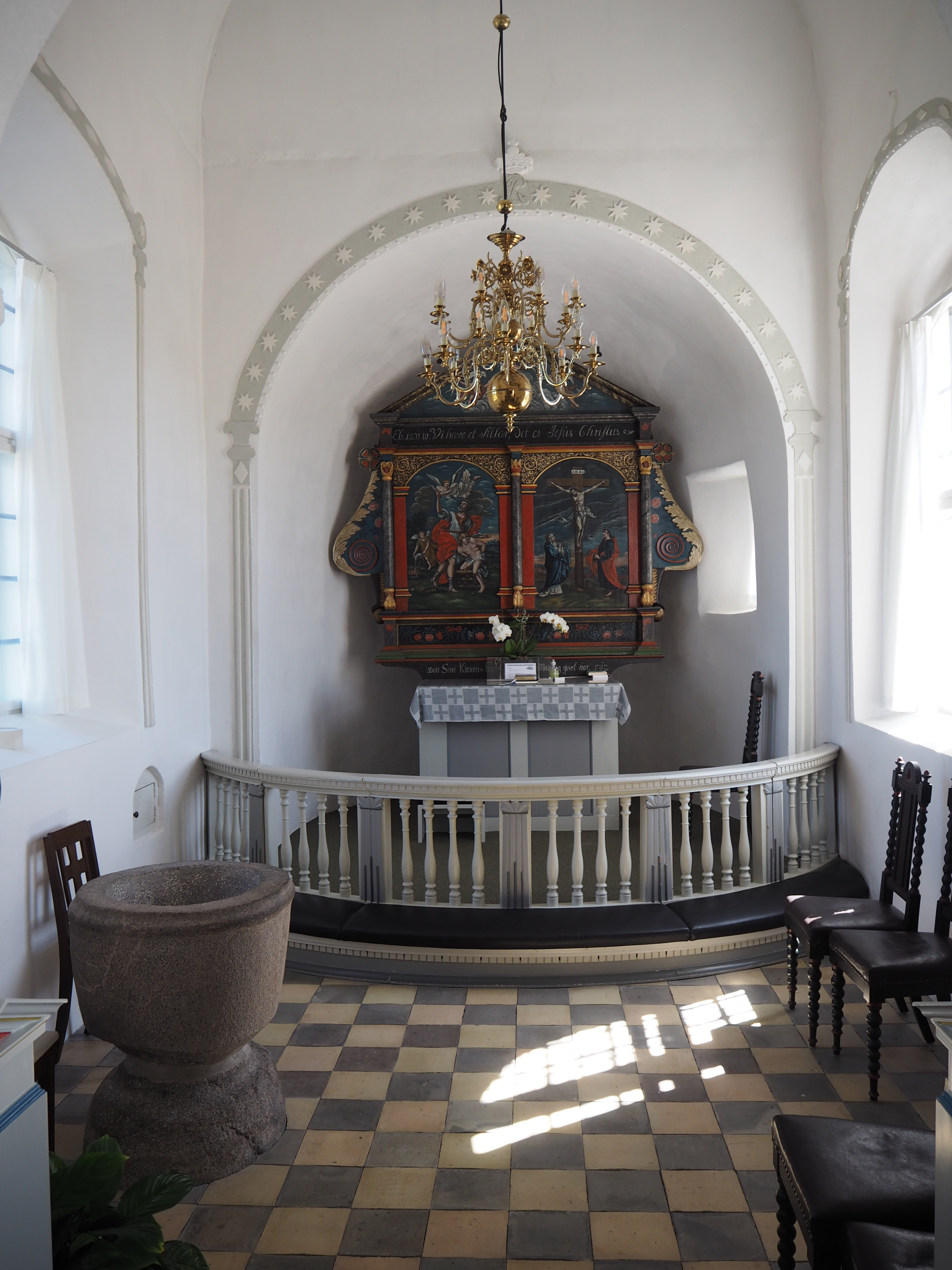
Apse

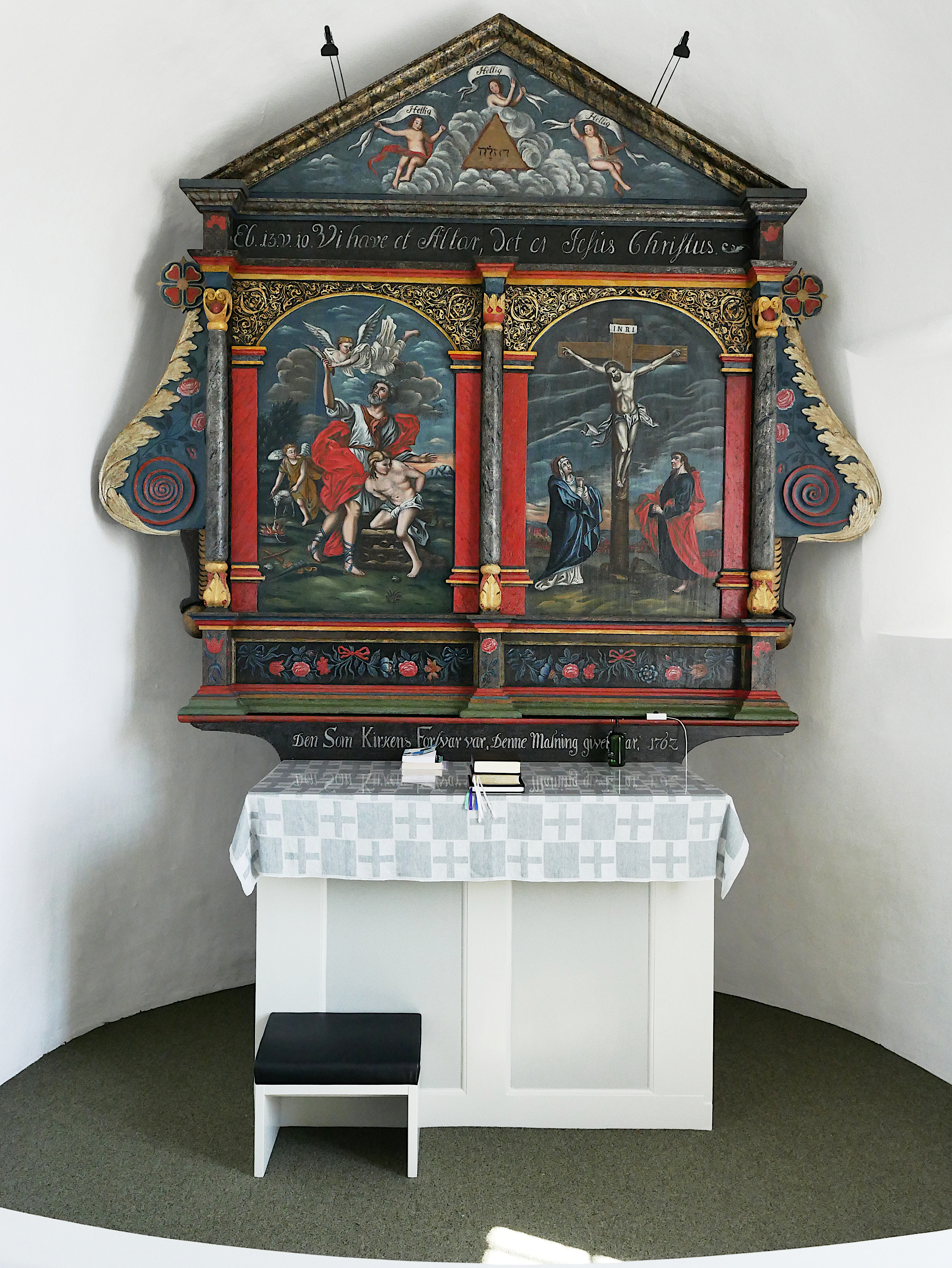
Altar

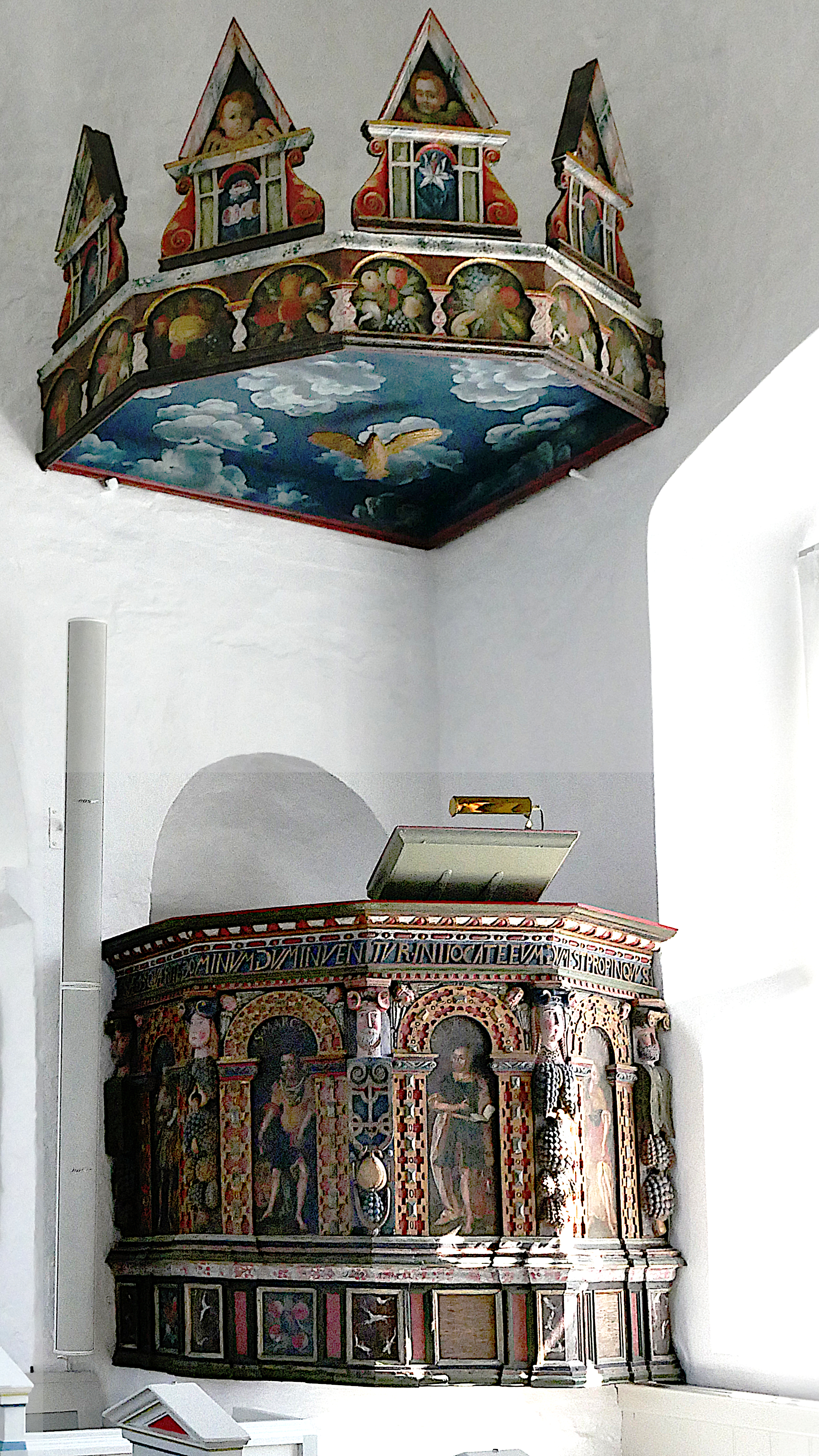
Pulpit

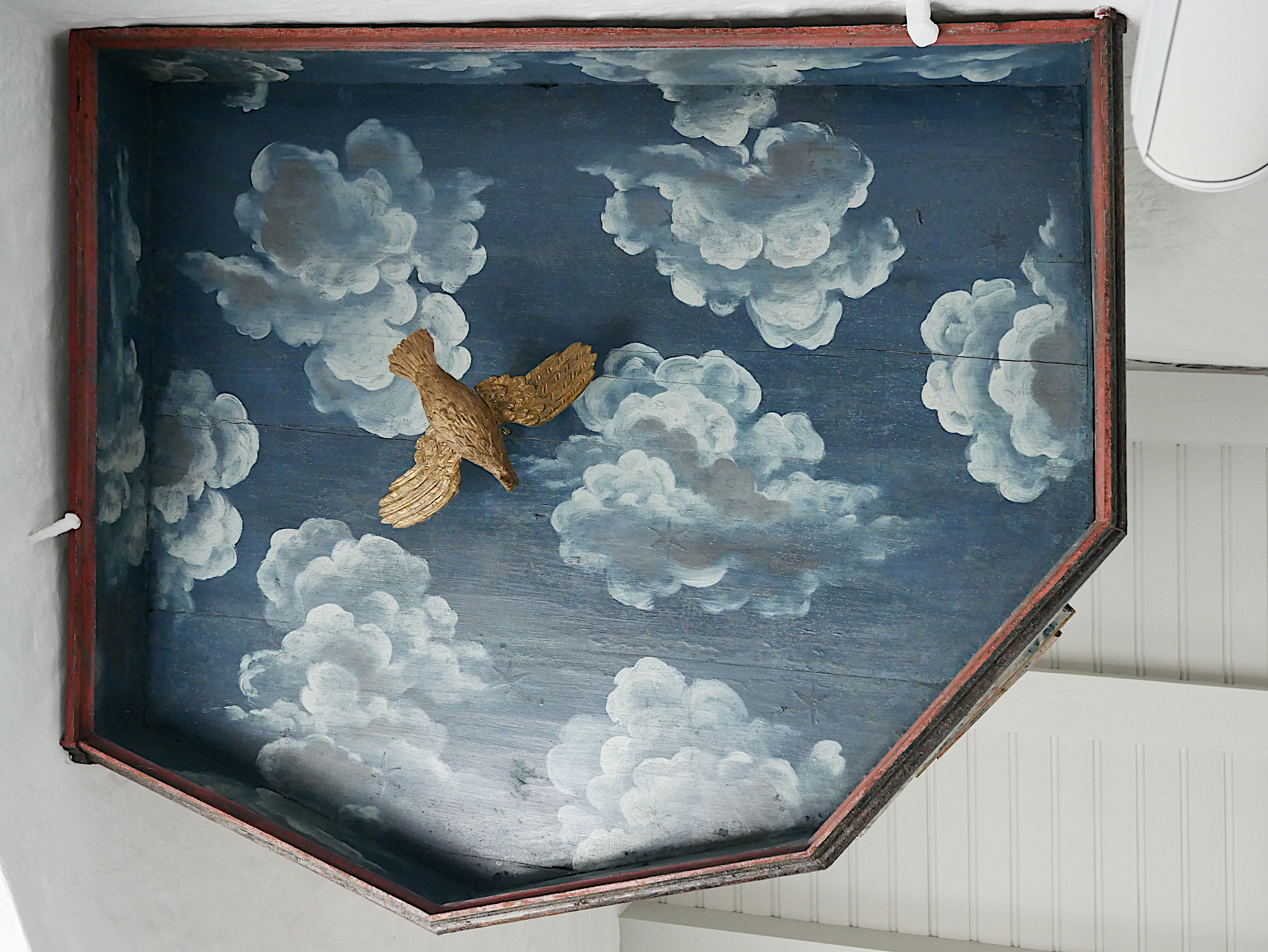
Soundboard

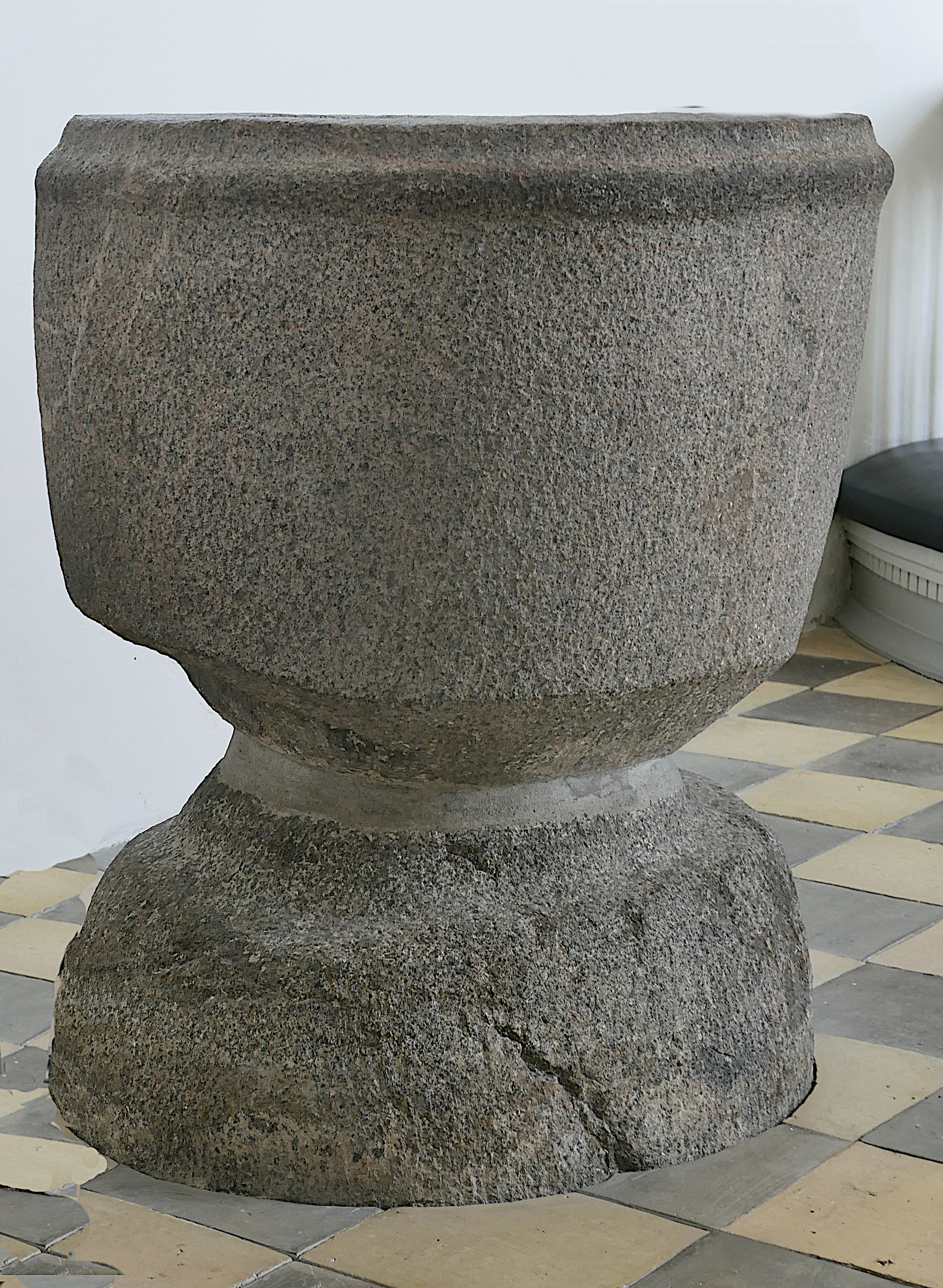
Baptismal font

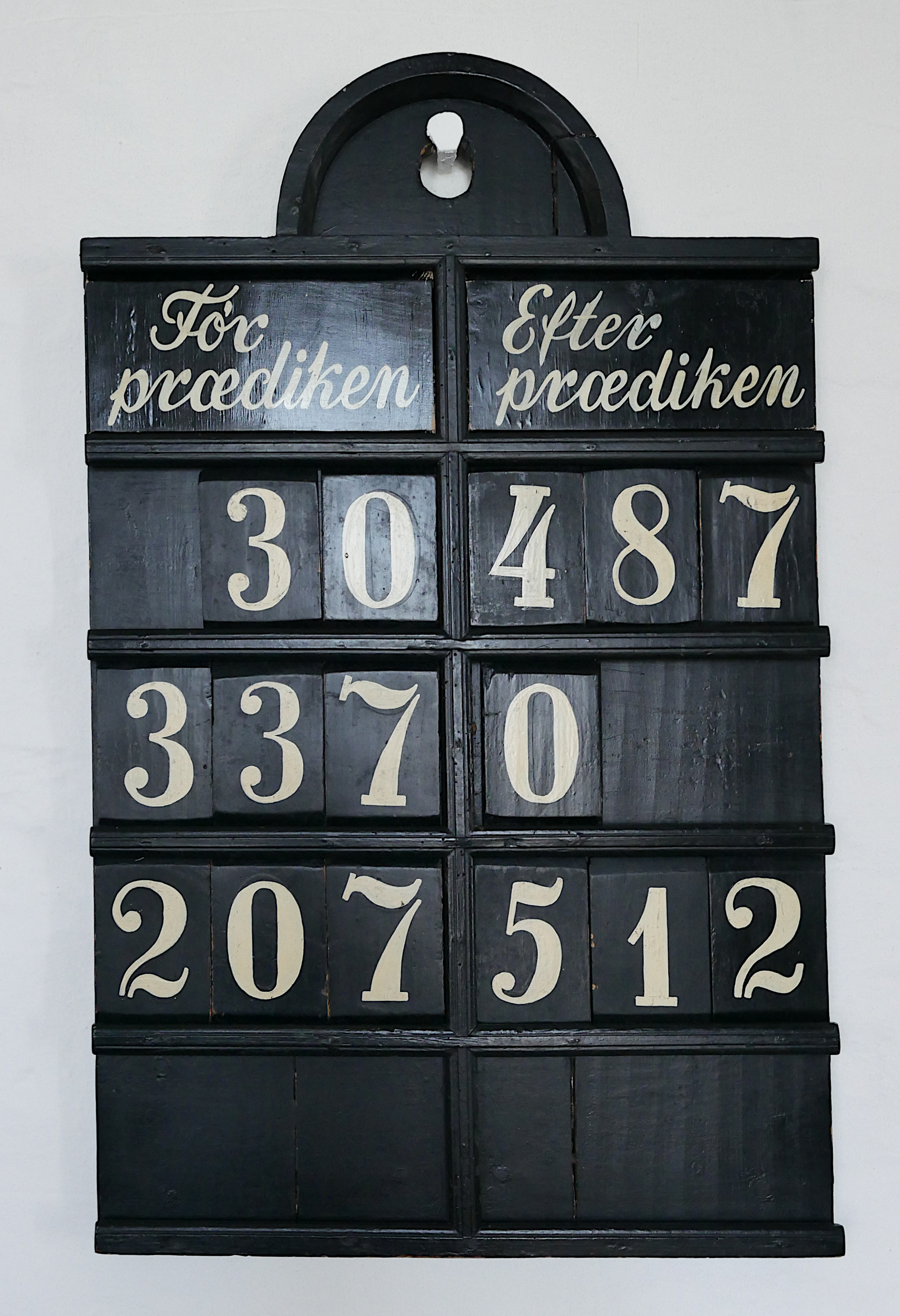
Hymn numbers board

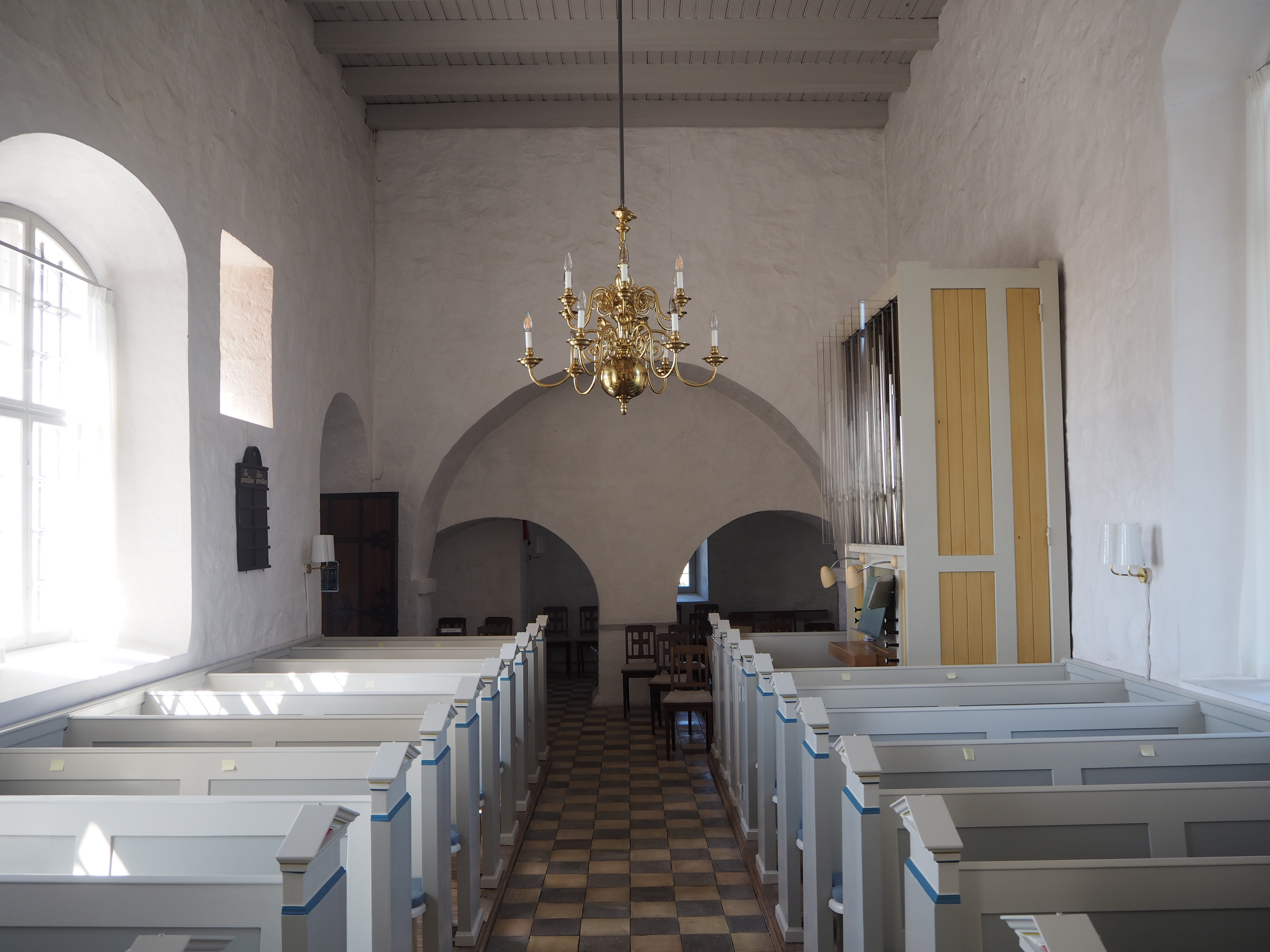
Nave

== See also ==
- List of churches on Bornholm
