= St. Paul's Church, Bornholm =

Church in Bornholm, Denmark

Coordinates: 55°1′21.72″N 15°2′25.08″E

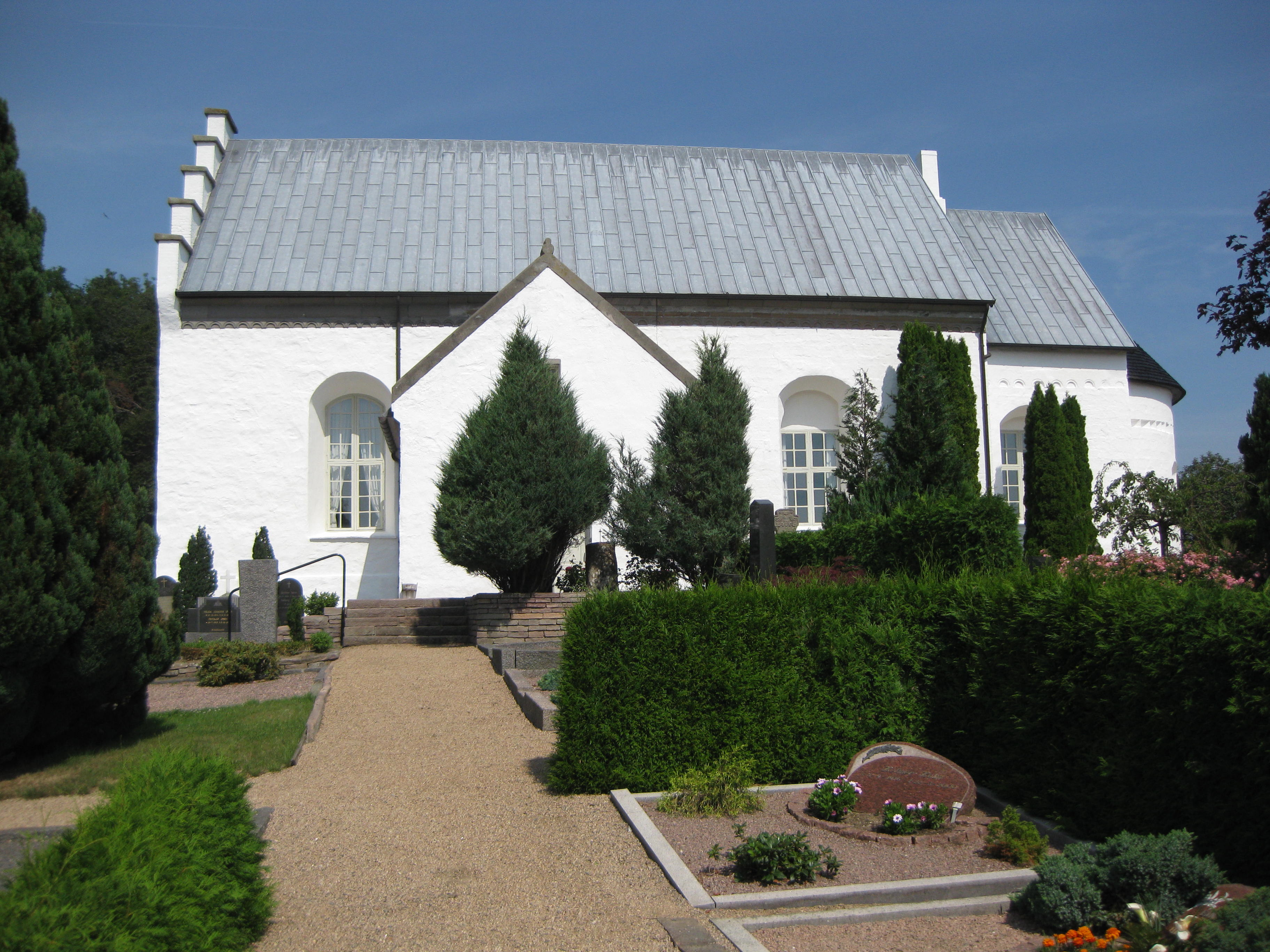
St. Paul's Church, Bornholm

St. Paul's Church (Danish: Sankt Povls Kirke) is a Romanesque church near Nexø on the Danish island of Bornholm. Unlike similar churches on the island, it has no tower.

== History and architecture ==
Located on a hilltop in south-eastern Bornholm, St. Paul's, the youngest of the island's Romanesque churches, consists of an apse, chancel and nave. Built c. 1248, it is distinctive in that it does not have an integrated tower. It does, however, have a separate, well-designed bell tower with a half-timbered belfry which originally served as the gateway to the churchyard. In 1871, the nave was lengthened some 4 metres towards the west. A fleur-de-lys can be seen above the door of the south porch.

== Interior ==
The church has several well-preserved frescoes from c. 1560, some depicting scenes from the Easter story (on the north wall of the nave), others with animals at play. The Renaissance pulpit from c. 1600 is similar to the one in Nexø Church which also has arched panels. The apse has three Romanesque windows with a cross-shaped finish. The Late Romanesque limestone font is from Gotland. The organ from 1973 was built by Poul-Gerhard Andersen.

== Gallery ==
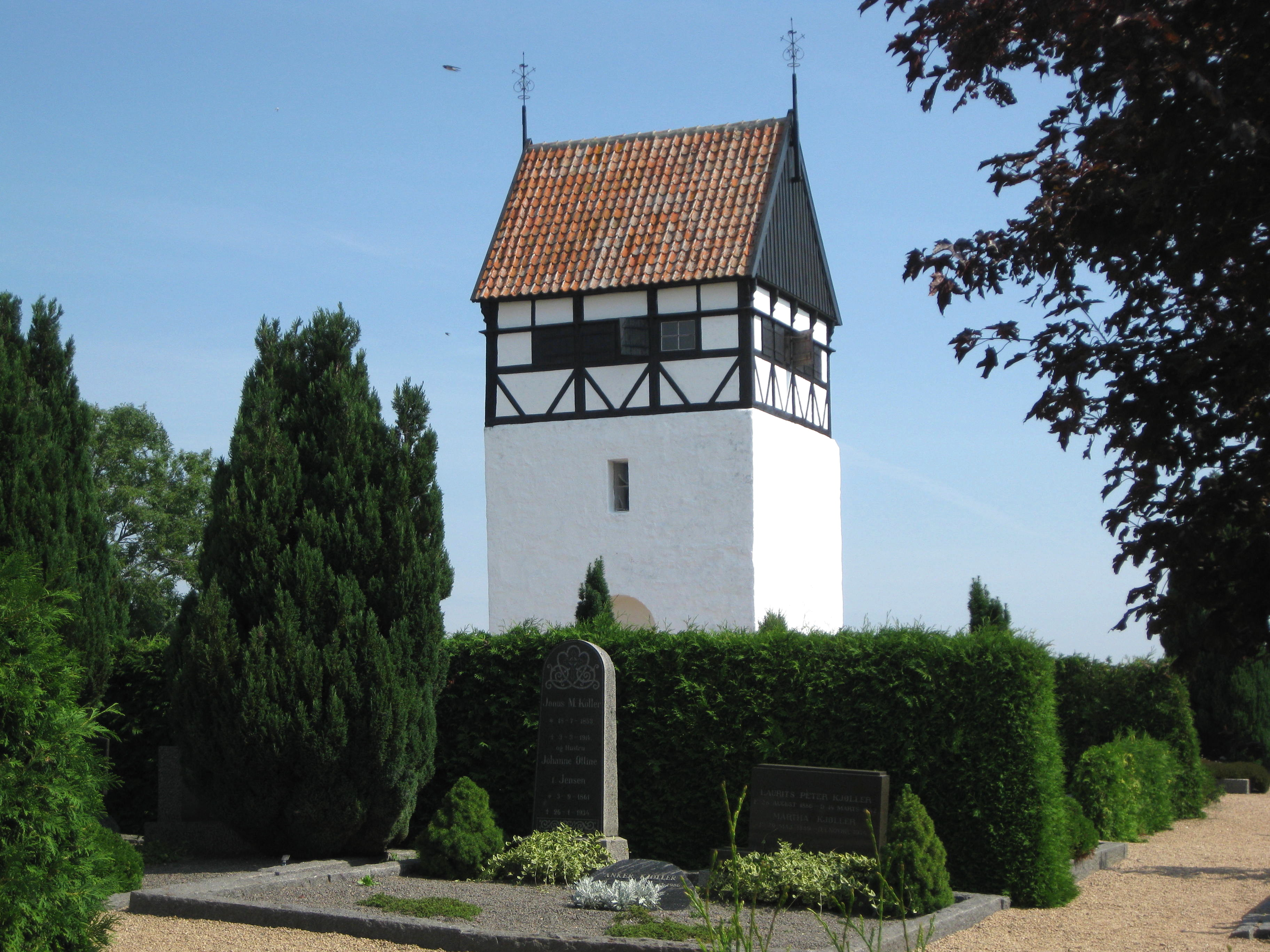
Bell tower

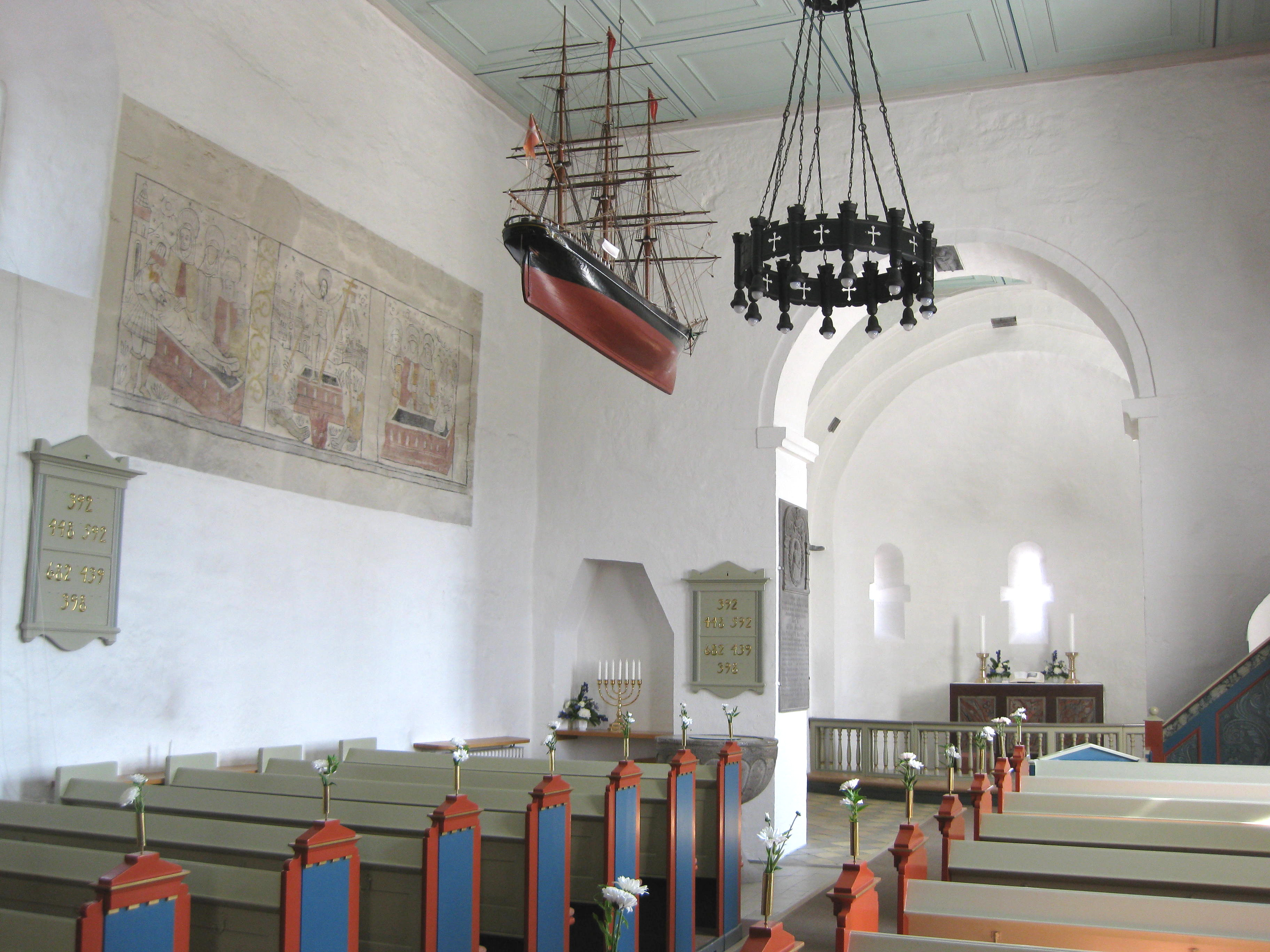
Nave

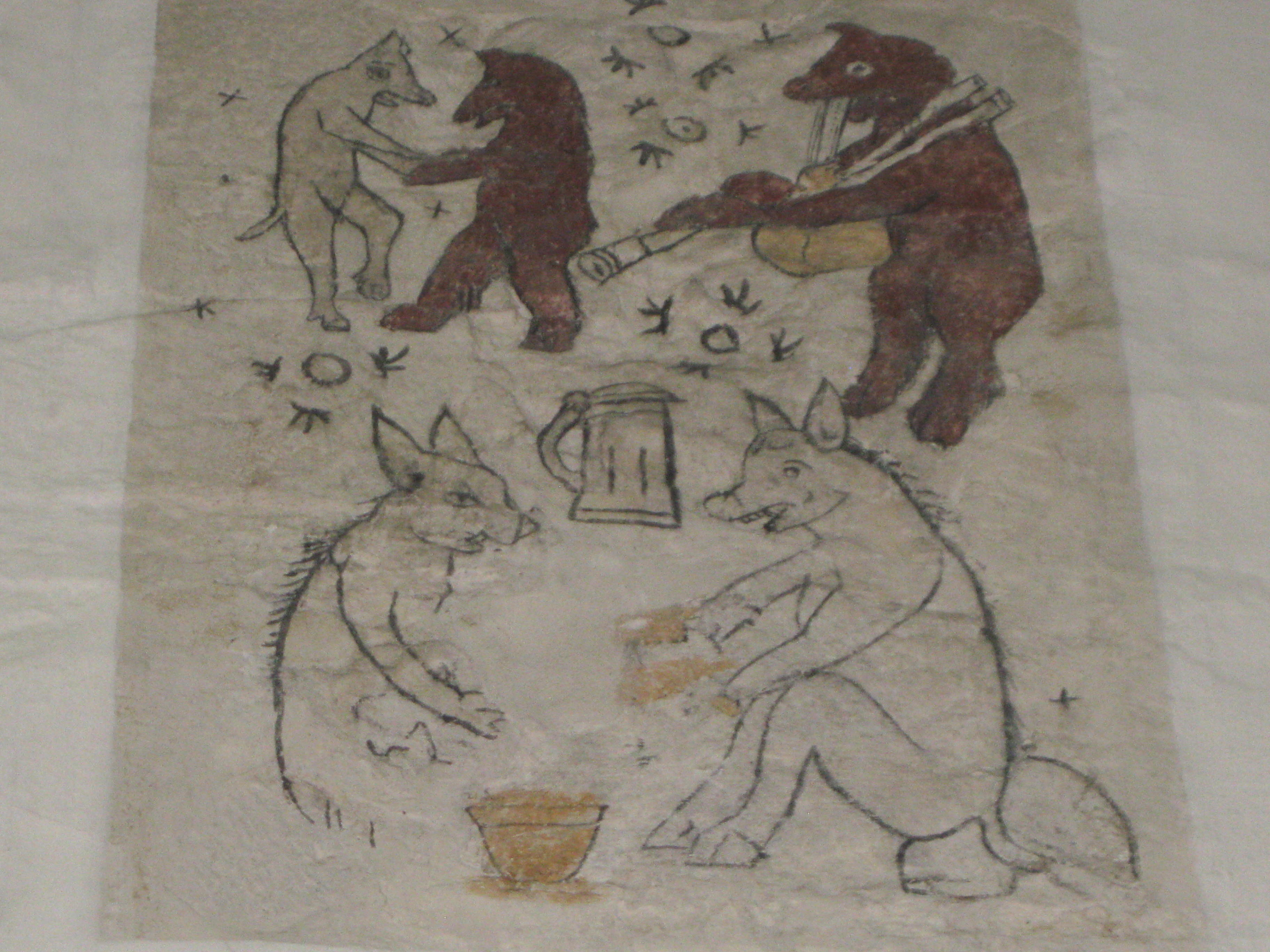
Fresco of bears at play

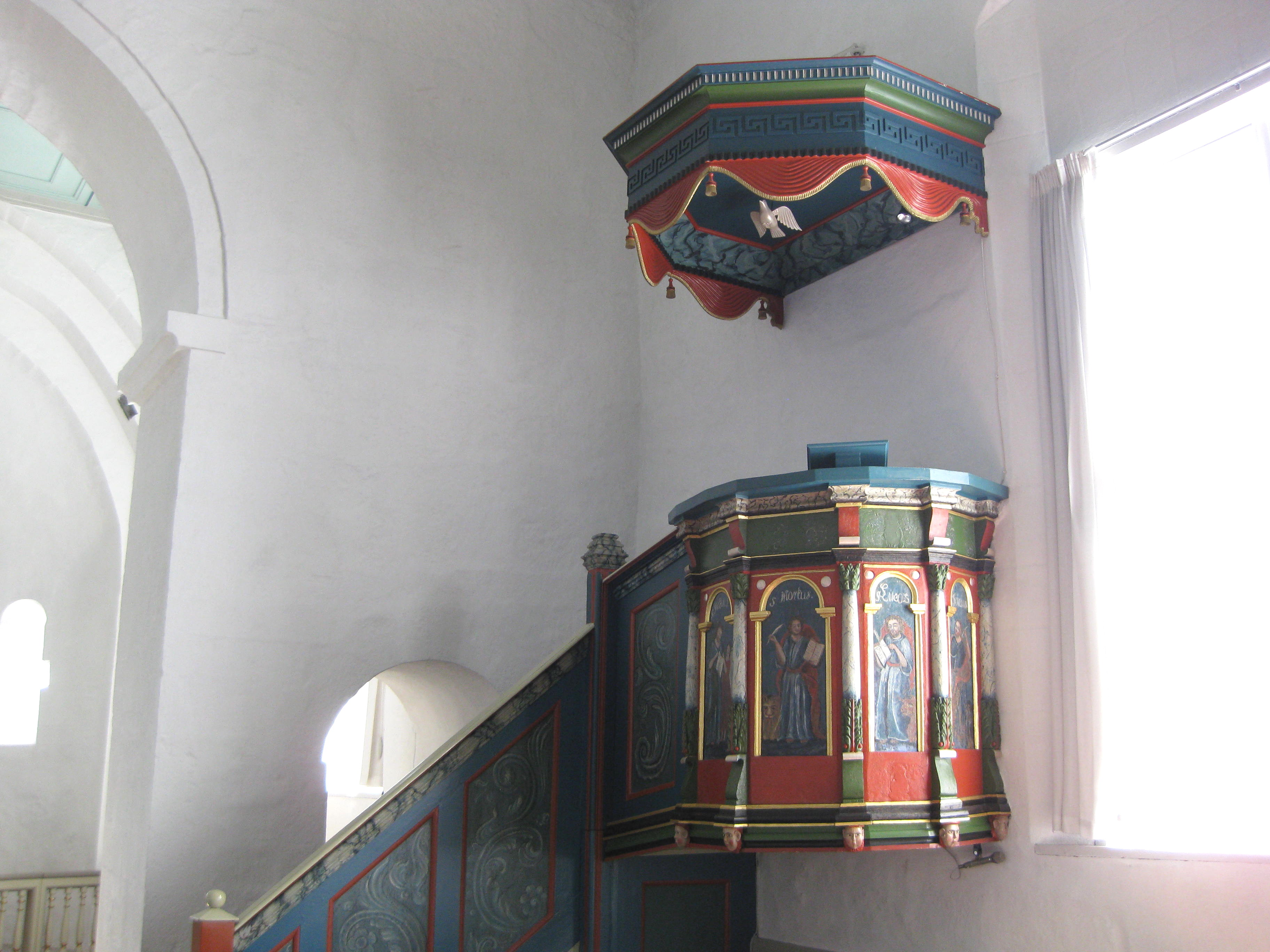
The pulpit

== See also ==
- List of churches on Bornholm
