= Tejn Church =

Church building in Bornholm Regional Municipality, Denmark

Coordinates: 55°14′44″N 14°50′06″E

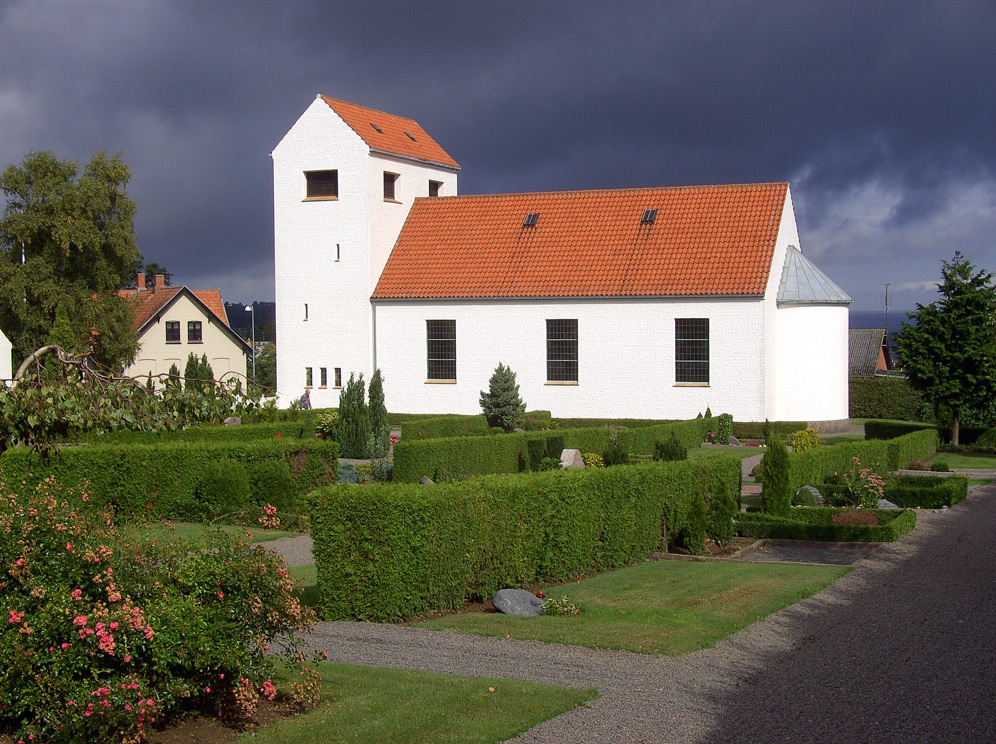
Tejn Church, Bornholm

Tejn Church is located at Tejn on the north-east coast of the Danish island of Bornholm. The most recent of the island's churches, it was built in 1940 to a Functionalist design by Emanuel Grauslund (1901-1951). It is a simple, whitewashed building on a granite base with rectangular, small-paned windows and a red-tiled roof.

Inside, the distinctive font consists of loosely connected granite blocks. The organ from 1980 was built by Finn Krohn.

== See also ==
- List of churches on Bornholm
