= Gudhjem Church =

Parish church of Gudhjem on the Danish island of Bornholm

Coordinates: 55°12′39″N 14°58′18″E

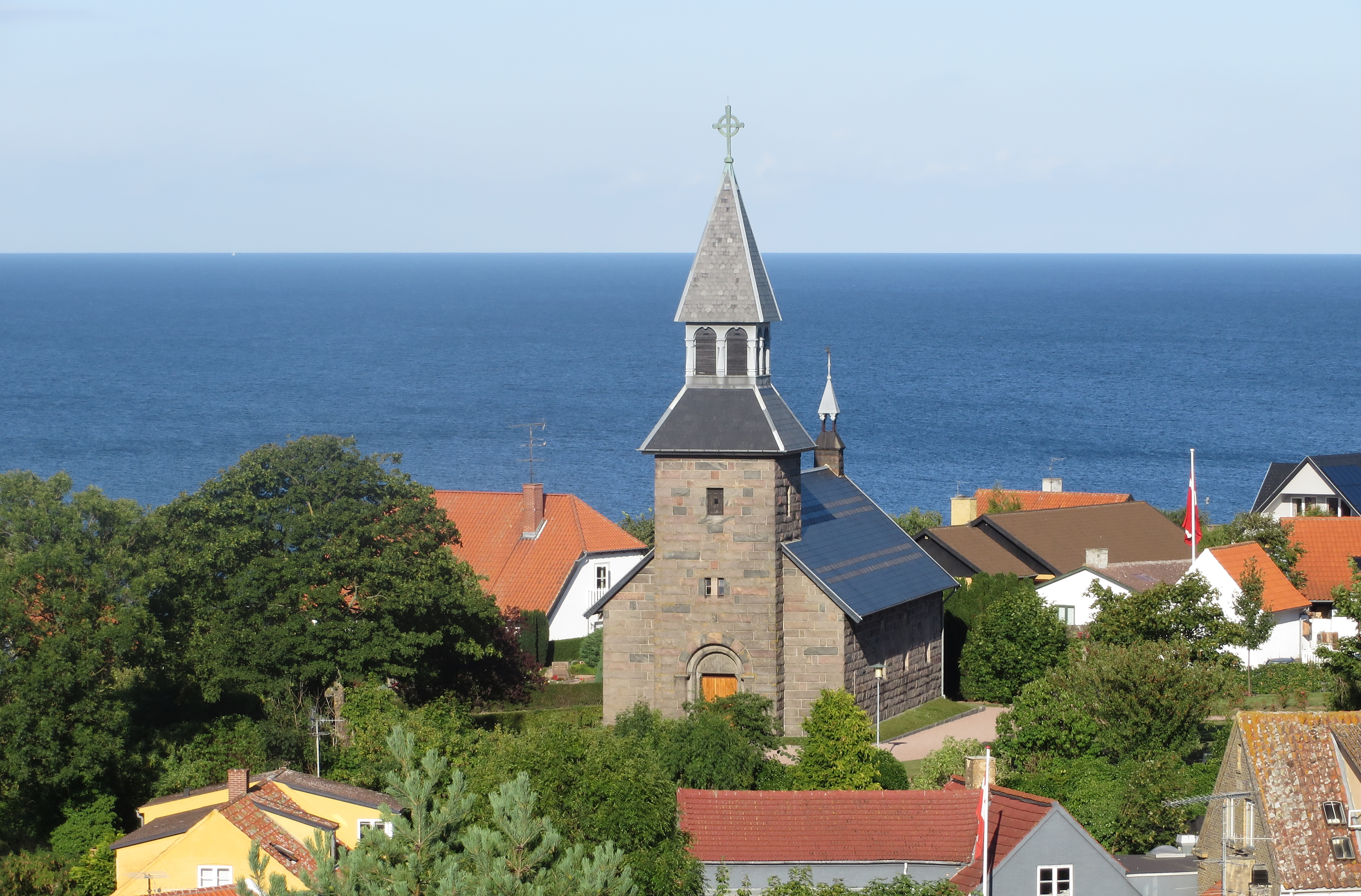
Gudhjem Church

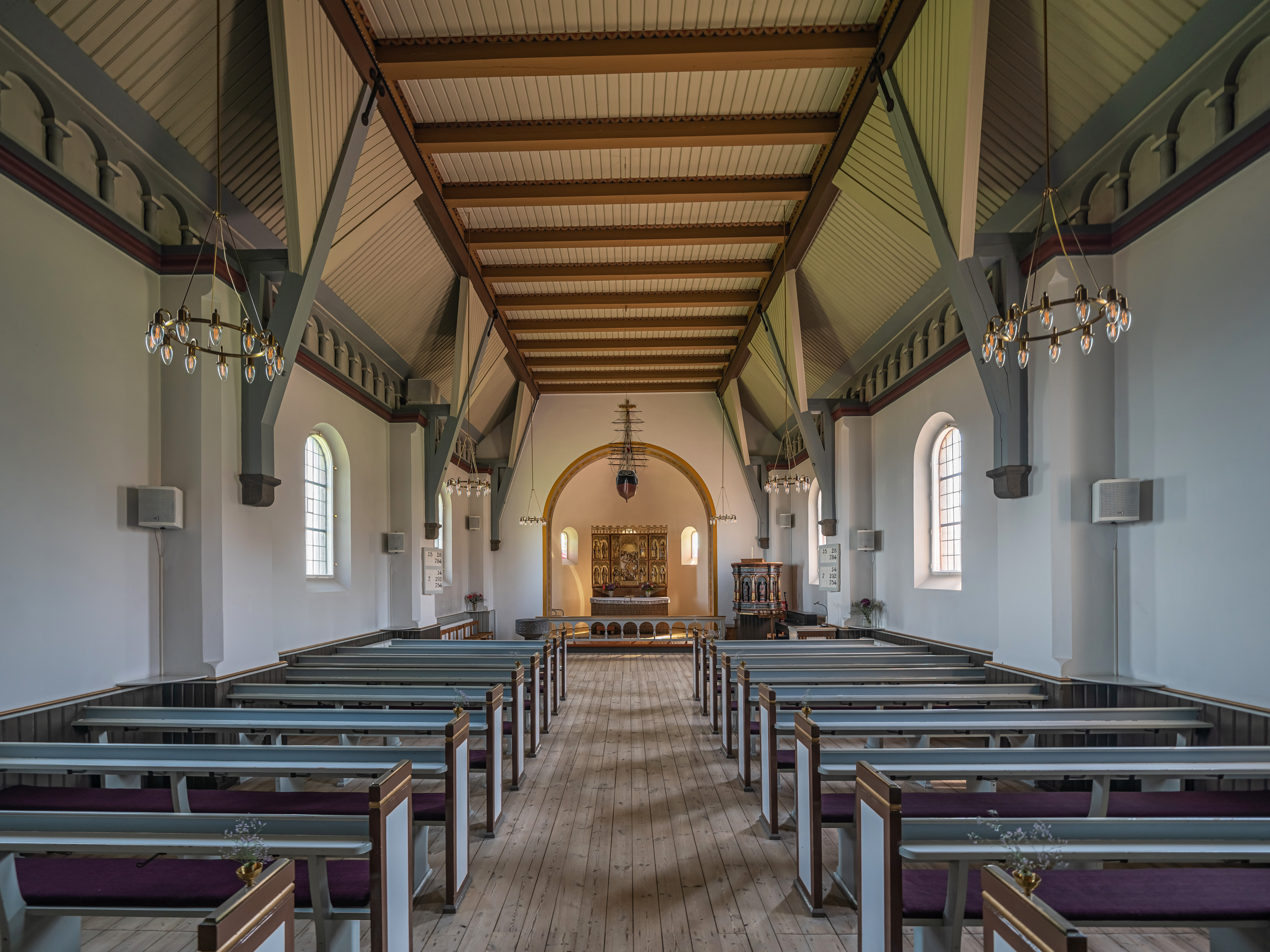
Church interior

Gudhjem Church is the parish church of Gudhjem on the north coast of the Danish island of Bornholm. Completed in 1893, it replaces the now ruined St Anne's Chapel (Sct Anna Kapel).

== History ==
In the Middle Ages, Gudhjem's St Anne's Chapel served the fishing communities on Bornholm's northern coast and was probably also used by Hanseatic visitors from the north of Germany. Based in particular on the fresco's discovered on the south wall, it is estimated that the chapel was built around 1300. Alterations were first carried out in the Middle Ages and again in 1790. With the Reformation the church passed from the Archbishopric of Lund to the Danish crown where it still belonged in 1809 but later became fully independent as is the present church. In 1895, the old church was dismantled. The new church, consecrated on 3 September 1893, was located to the west of the old churchyard as it was decided to leave the foundations of St Anne's in place, safeguarding its site as one of the island's last coastal chapels.

== Description ==
Designed by Mathias Bidstrup, the new church consists of a nave, a polygonal apse at the eastern end and a tower with a spire to the west. It is built of granite blocks and has a slate roof. Some of the artefacts from the old church can be seen in the new one. The altarpiece in the form of a triptych dates from c. 1475 and is from a Lübeck workshop. The centrepiece shows the Virgin Mary on her deathbed together with the twelve apostles. The panel on the left depicts St Anne with the infant Jesus as well as St John and other saints. The right panel presents St Dorothea with St Olaf to one side. The pulpit from 1575 was substantially reworked in 1789. Its four panels, separated by columns, show the four apostles.
