= Vestermarie =

- Village
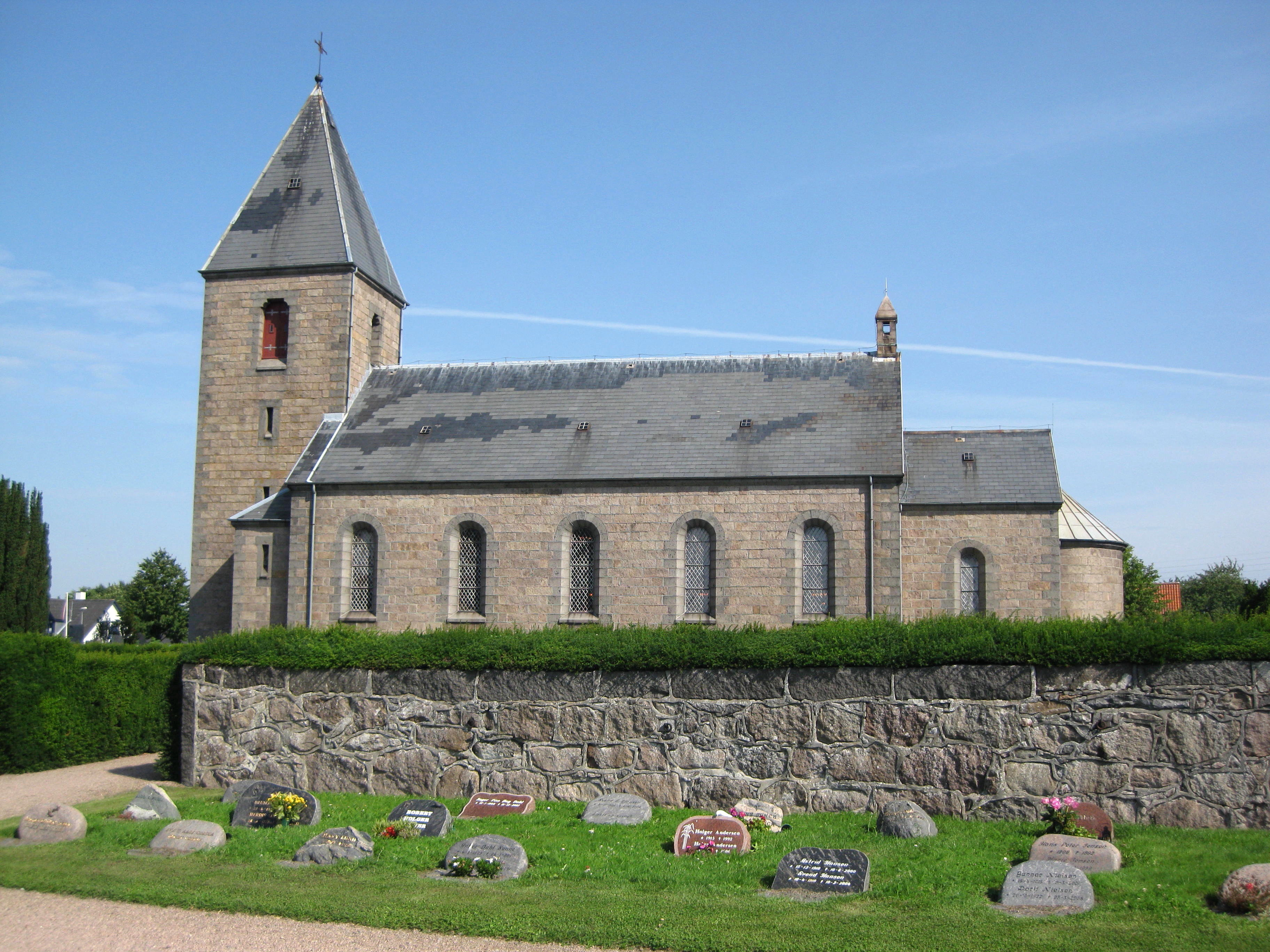
- Vestermarie Church, Bornholm

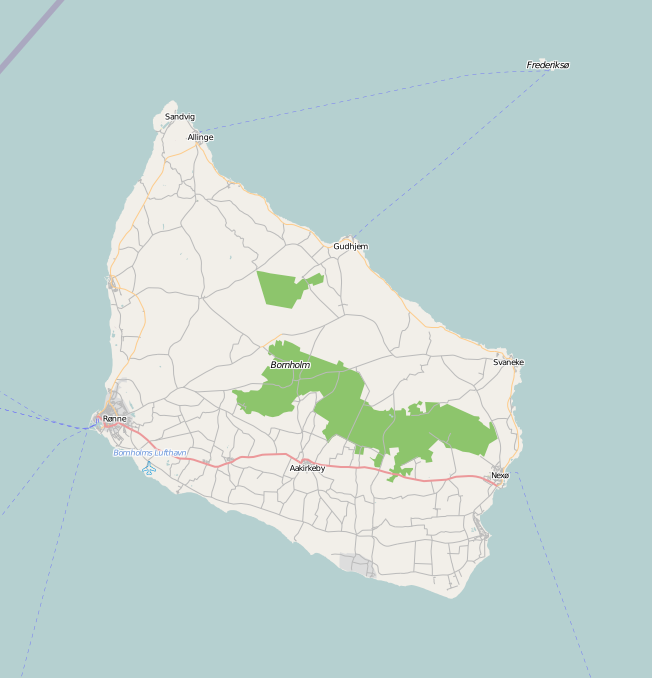
- Location on Bornholm
- Coordinates: 55°06′28″N 14°49′24″E
- Country: Denmark
- Region: Capital (Hovedstaden)
- Municipality: Bornholm

Population (2026)
  - Total: 224
- Time zone: UTC+1 (CET)
  - Summer (DST): UTC+2 (CEST)

Vestermarie is a village midway between Rønne and Aakirkeby on the Danish island of Bornholm. As of 2026, it has a population of 224.

== History ==
The village takes its name from the original Vestermarie Church which was dedicated to the Virgin Mary in 1335. The prefix "vester" (west) distinguishes it from Østermarie, "øster" meaning "east". Today's church was completed in 1835 in the Neo-Romanesque style. The churchyard contains a number of runestones.

== The village today ==
The village is essentially a residential area for those working in Rønne, only 8 kilometres (5.0 mi) away. Since the 1950s, it has grown gradually to the west and northwest of the church. There is a school (1964) and a food store but no other businesses. The community hall (forsamlingshuset) is of interest to the local heritage.

== Prehistoric sites ==
An impressive group of menhirs stands on Bjergebakken (102 m) some 2 km north of the village. The grave site on Store Bjergegårdsbakken was investigated in the 1890s and listed in 1894. In addition to burnt bones, there were fibulae, a sword, beads, iron keys and small pots indicating that the graves date from the end of the Iron Age, i.e. 500–400 BC.
