= Tejn =

- Town
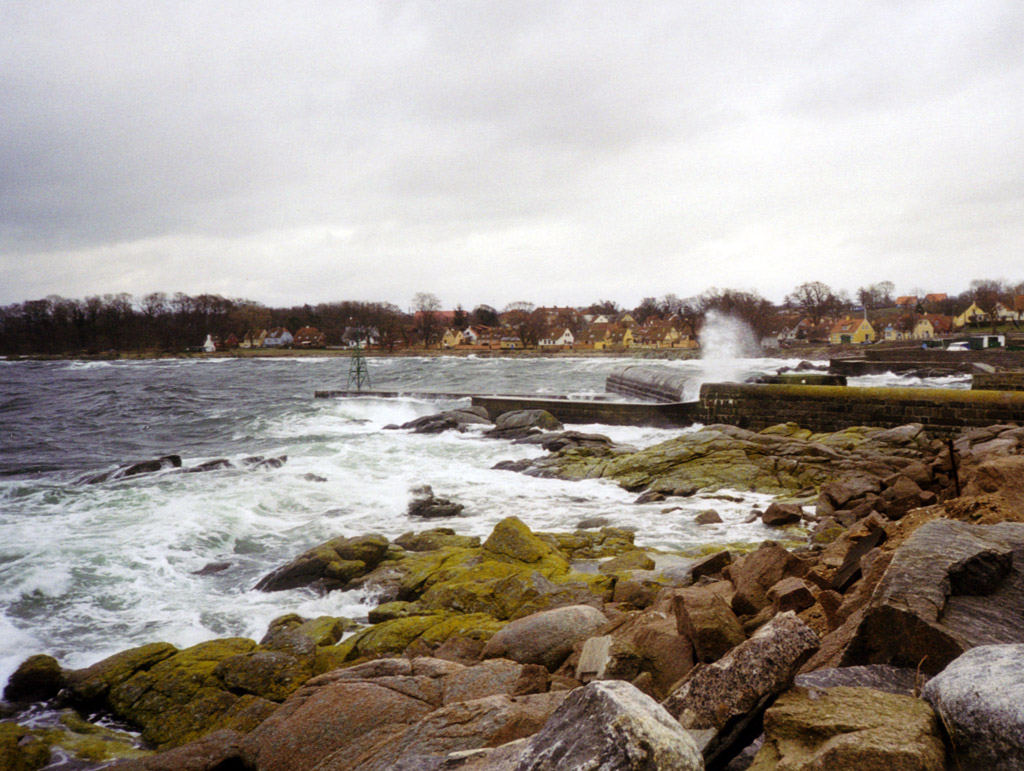
- Tejn harbour

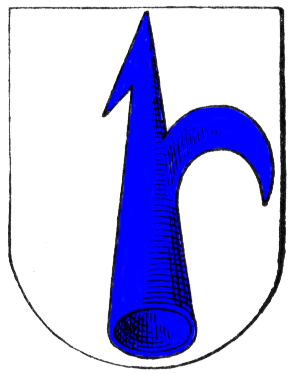
- Seal

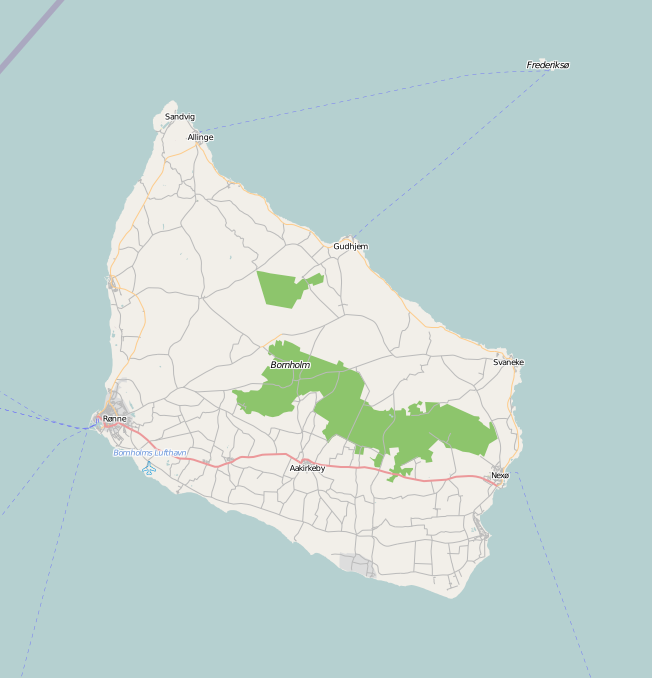
- Location on Bornholm
- Coordinates: 55°14′43″N 14°50′06″E
- Country: Denmark
- Region: Capital (Hovedstaden)
- Municipality: Bornholm

Population (2026)
  - Total: 753
- Time zone: UTC+1 (CET)
  - Summer (DST): UTC+2 (CEST)

Tejn is a harbour town on the north-eastern coast of the Danish island of Bornholm, 5 km (3.1 mi) south of Allinge-Sandvig. As of 1 January 2026, it has a population of 753. Initially a fishing village, it grew considerably during the 20th century as the harbour was enlarged on several occasions. The local fishing industry reached its peak in the 1970s and 1980s but has since decreased, with negative implications for the town's activities.

== Tourism ==
The large harbour with both fishing vessels and pleasure craft is an impressive sight. As a result of its westerly location and the protection offered by the surrounding heights, it can be accessed without danger in all weathers. The post mill standing high above the harbour was built around 1800 in Årsballe but some 50 years later it was moved to Tejn where it continued to operate until 1941. Now a listed building, it has been well preserved but is not open to the public. In the adjoining village of Sandkås there are several hotels, guest houses and summer houses overlooking the rocky coastline. Sandkås also has a pleasant sandy beach, the only one suitable for bathing in the area.

== Church ==
Tejn Church, the most recent of Bornholm's churches, was designed in the Functionalist style by Emanuel Grauslund and completed in 1940.
