= St. Ib's Church =

Church in Bornholm, Denmark

Coordinates: 55°07′01″N 15°06′17″E

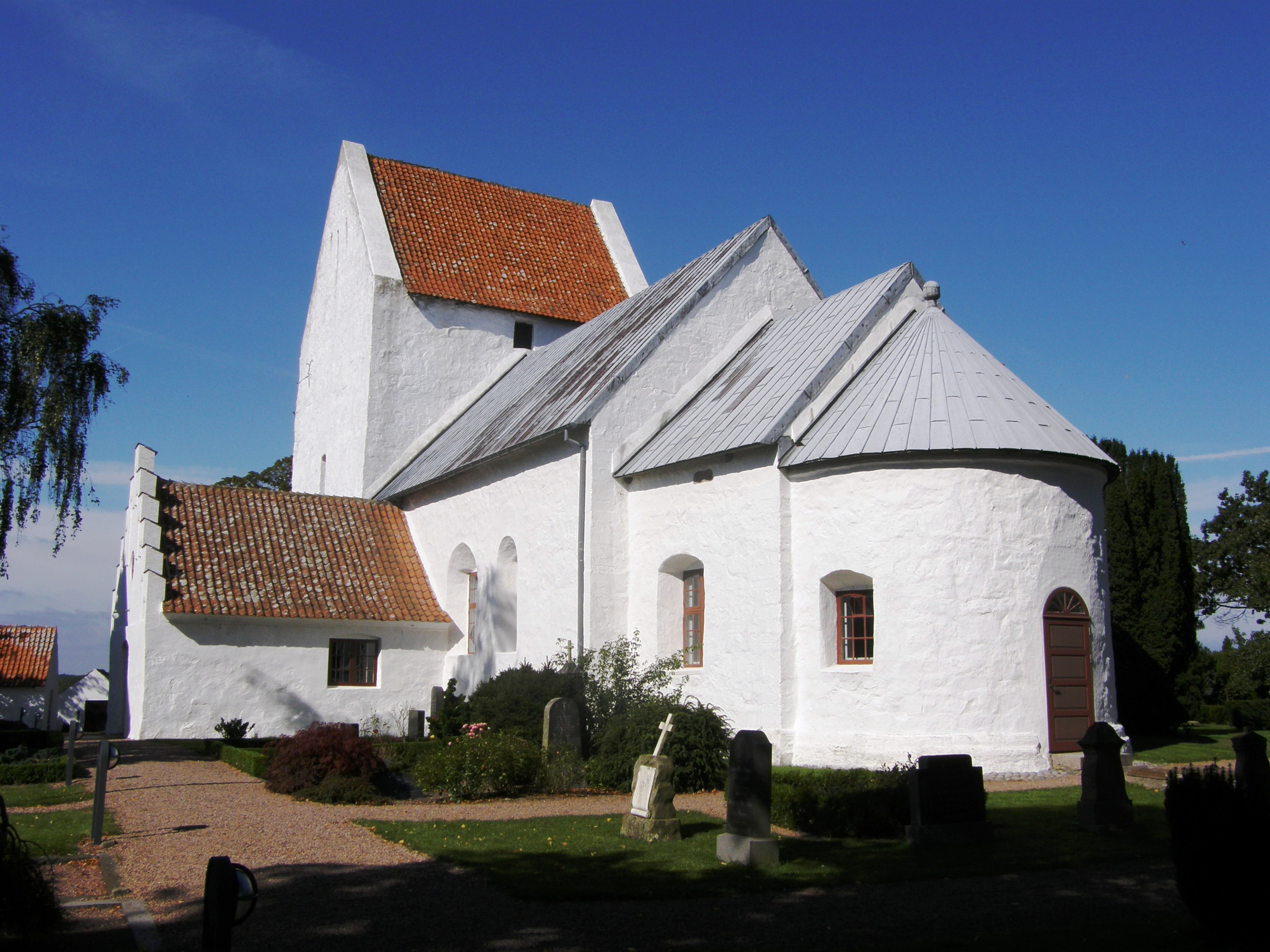
St. Ib's Church, Bornholm

St. Ib's Church (Sankt Ibs Kirke or Ibsker), 3 km south-west of Svaneke on the Danish island of Bornholm, is a fine 12th century Romanesque building. The altarpiece was painted by Christoffer Wilhelm Eckersberg in 1846. The Renaissance pulpit (ca 1600) was decorated by Paul Høm in 1964 with ceramics of the four evangelists.

== Etymology ==
The church was originally known as Beati Jacobi (1335), in 1429 it became Sancti Jacobs kirke (St. James's Church) and later evolved to Ibs Kirke (Ib being the familiar Scandinavian form of Jacob) which in turn became Ibsker (ker meaning church). Today the parish is officially known as Ibsker.

== Architecture ==
The church consists of a Romanesque tower, nave, choir and apsis, all from the end of the 12th century. The porch was added some 200 years later while the extension to the north was constructed in 1867. The tower is of interest in view of its vaulting which can be seen at the western end of the nave, opening up from two arches. The interior is a fine example of the Romanesque style with whitewashed walls and arches of limestone and Bornholm marble. The cross-section added in 1867 changed the character of the building as the nave's original wall was torn down but the church's Romanesque appearance was partly restored in 1964 when a new organ was installed along the axis of the old wall. During the restoration work, traces of frescos or kalkmalerier were found but were too faint to warrant further attention.

== Furnishings ==
The altarpiece consists of a painting from 1846 of Christ in the Garden of Gethsemane by the renowned Danish painter, C. W. Eckersberg. There is evidence of earlier altarpieces during the Roman Catholic period of the church's history, including the figure of the Virgin Mary, which now hangs over the font, and the crucifix on the nave's southern wall, both from around 1500. The altar's large candlesticks are from 1891 while its seven-armed candelabra is from 1933. The oldest artefact inside the church is the font which is made of Gotland limestone. Standing at the western end of the church, it is, in fact, taller than it appears as its pedestal is hidden under the floor which, together with other layers of flooring, was added later. There are two bells in the tower, the smaller one from 1773 and the larger from 1822.

== See also ==
- List of churches on Bornholm
