= Mathias Bidstrup =

Danish architect

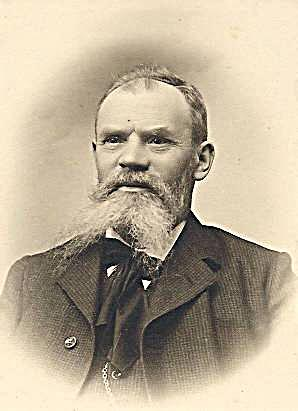
Mathias Andreas Bidstrup

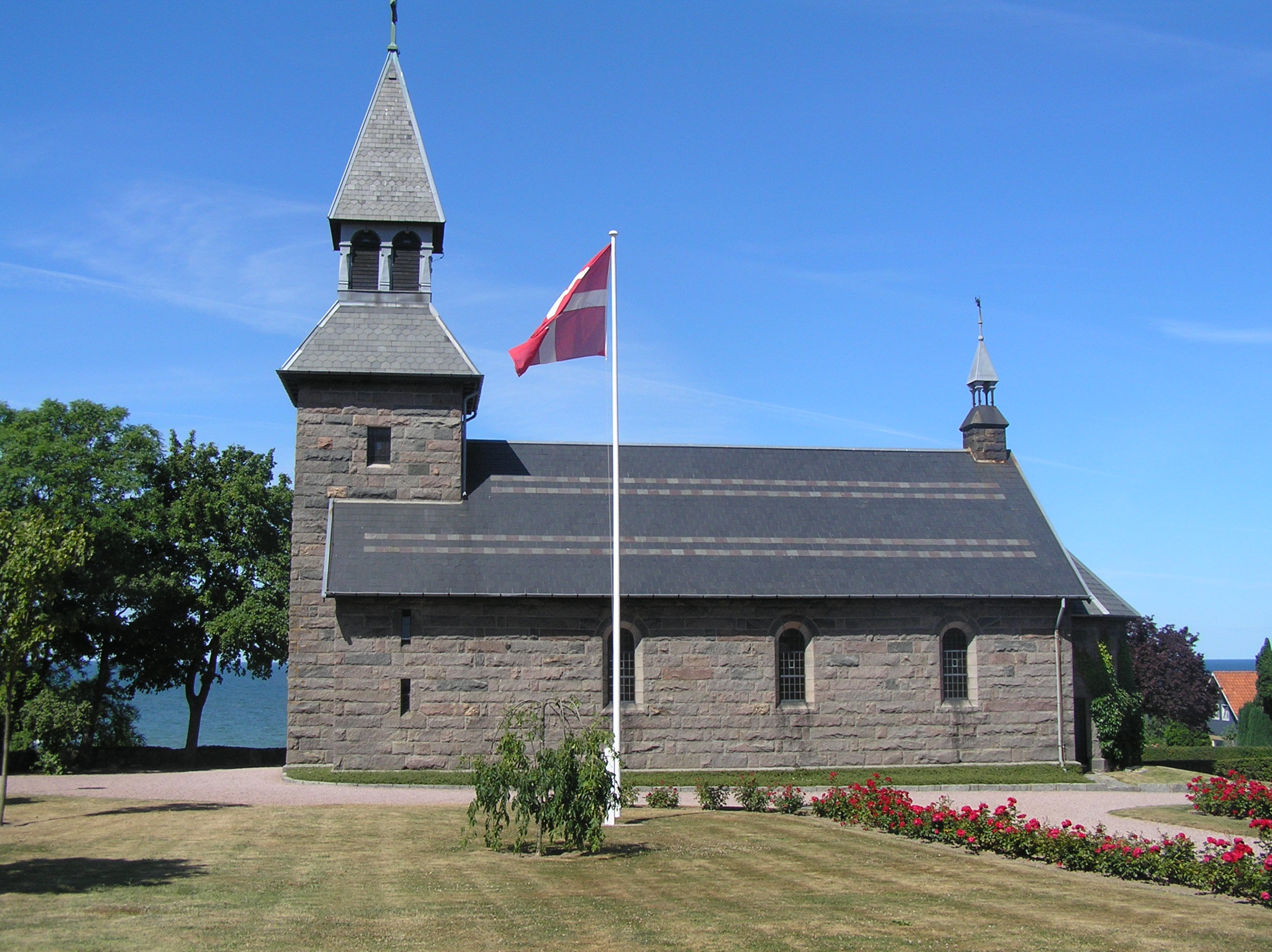
Gudhjem Church

Mathias Andreas Bidstrup (25 March 1852 – 25 January 1929) was a Danish architect.

== Biography ==
He was born in Rønne, Bornholm, the son of cobbler Jorgen Bernhard Bidstrup and Marie Hansine Sonne.

Mathias Bidstrup attended the Royal Danish Academy of Fine Arts for a single quarter in 1876. In 1876, he worked as a teacher at an art college with the architect Johan Daniel Herholdt. From 1876 to 1916 he was a partner in the construction firm H.P. Bidstrups Byggeforretning. He was chairman of the Rønne Craft and Industry Association, a member of the Joint Representation of Danish Industry and Handicraft and chairman of the Bornholm Museum Association. Bidstrup was the head of Rønne Technical School for 46 years (1881–1927). He was also a member of the City Council Rønne 1882–1888.

As an architect, he had built a huge number of buildings on Bornholm, schools, churches (including Gudhjem Church), urban and rural stations, the post office in Rønne and many private houses. Bidstrup was superintendent of Rønne Technical School for 46 years (1876–1915) and co-founder of Bornholm Museum in 1893.

== Personal life ==
On 17 April 1878 he married Cecilie Margrethe Bidstrup at the Sct. Nicolai Church in Rønne. He was a Knight of the Order of the Dannebrog. His interests included the arts, history, archeology, engineering and geology. Two portraits of Bidstrup are found on the Bornholm island's Museum. Bidstrup is buried at Rønne Kirkegård.

== See also ==
- List of Danish architects
