= List of tallest structures in Denmark =

This is a list of the tallest structures in Denmark. The list contains all types of structures. Please expand the list and correct it, where necessary.

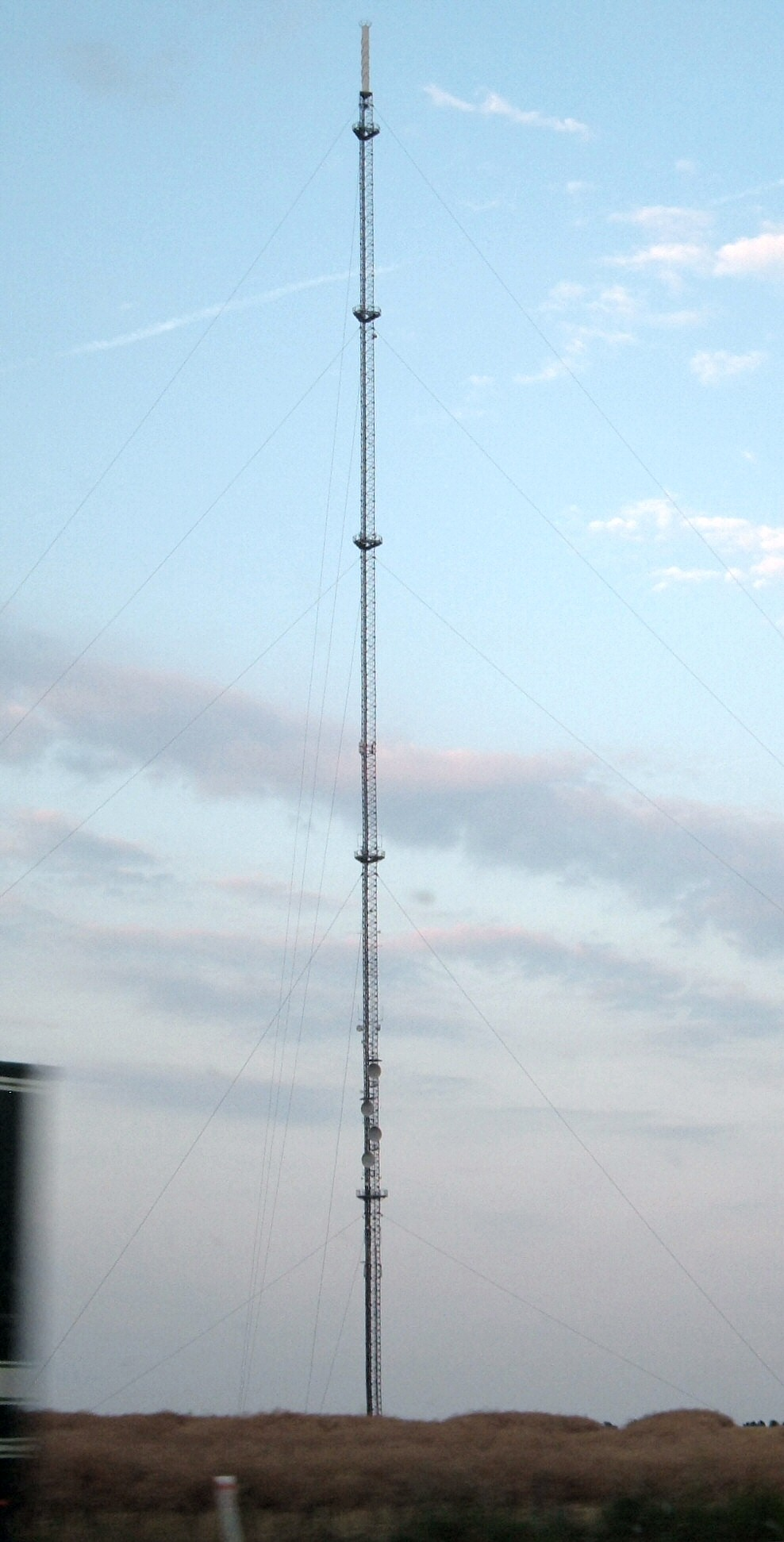
Vordingborg Transmitter

Construction	Pinnacle height (ft)	Pinnacle height (m)	Year of construction	Construction type	Location	Coordinates	Remarks
Angissoq LORAN-C transmitter (old mast)	1,350 ft	411.48 m	1963	Guyed Mast	Angissoq, Greenland	59°59′16″N 45°10′23″W	Collapsed on 27 July 1964, insulated against ground.
Globecom Tower	1,241 ft	378.25 m	1954	Guyed Mast	Pituffik Space Base, Greenland		Insulated against ground. Demolished 1992.
Tommerup Transmitter	1,054 ft	321.3 m	1987/1988	Guyed Mast	Tommerup	55°18′52.8″N 10°13′34.9″E	
Hadsten Transmitter	1,051 ft	320.3 m	1987/1988	Guyed Mast	Hadsten	56°18′14″N 9°58′35″E	
Hove Transmitter	1,051 ft	320.3 m	1987/1988	Guyed Mast	Hove	55°42′59.7″N 12°14′14.5″E	
Jyderup Transmitter	1,051 ft	320.3 m	1987/1988	Guyed Mast	Jyderup	55°41′04.7″N 11°27′41.8″E	
Nibe Transmitter	1,051 ft	320.3 m	1987/1988	Guyed Mast	Nibe	56°58′44.5″N 9°45′51.5″E	
Røde Kro Transmitter	1,051 ft	320.3 m	1987/1988	Guyed Mast	Røde Kro	55°01′58.6″N 9°14′55.4″E	
Videbæk Transmitter	1,051 ft	320.3 m	1987/1988	Guyed Mast	Videbæk	56°08′27.2″N 8°42′18.4″E	
Vordingborg Transmitter	1,051 ft	320.3 m	1987/1988	Guyed Mast	Vordingborg	55°03′07.2″N 11°59′17.9″E	
Hedensted Transmitter	1,037 ft	316.1 m	1987/1988	Guyed Mast	Hedensted	55°48′35.9″N 9°37′25.3″E	
Viborg-Sparkær Transmitter	1,036 ft	315.8 m	1987/1988	Guyed Mast	Sparkær	56°27′42″N 9°14′04.3″E	
Rø Transmitter	1,036 ft	315.8 m	1987/1988	Guyed Mast	Rø	55°09′36″N 14°53′13″E	Top of mast is 431.29 metres above sea level and highest point in Denmark (excluding Greenland and the Faroe Islands).
Varde-Nordenskov Transmitter	1,036 ft	315.8 m	1987/1988	Guyed Mast	Varde-Nordenskov	55°39′25.1″N 8°40′16.8″E	
Siemens Gamesa SG 14-222 DD	889 ft	271.4 m	2021	Wind turbine	Østerild		
Storebælt Bridge	883 ft	269.17 m	1998	Bridge towers	Storebælt	54°20′25.2″N 11°01′23.6″E ; 55°20′37″N 11°02′54″E	
Chimney of Esbjerg Power Station	821 ft	250.24 m	?	Chimney	Esbjerg	55°27′16.5″N 8°27′19.1″E	
Østerild Wind Turbine Test Center Light Masts	820 ft	250 m	2011	Guyed masts	Thisted-Østerild	57°05′13.35″N 8°52′50.5″E ; 57°02′55.92″N 8°52′50.96″E	
Chimney of Fynsværket 2	771 ft	235 m	?	Chimney	Odense	55°25′47.3″N 10°24′39.6″E	
Østerild Vestas V-164 Wind Turbine	728 ft	222 m	2013/2014	Tower	Thisted-Østerild		
Rangstrup transmitter	726 ft	221.3 m	?	Guyed mast	Tønder	55°07′22.2″N 9°11′10.1″E	
Sønder Højrup transmitter	726 ft	221.3 m	?	Guyed mast	Sonder Hojrup	55°16′59.2″N 10°28′29.2″E	
Gladsaxesenderen	722.4 ft	220.2 m	1955	Guyed mast	Gladsaxe	55°44′05.4″N 12°29′30.3″E	https://da.wikipedia.org/wiki/Gladsaxesenderen
Chimney of Asnæsværket 1	722 ft	220.1 m	?	Chimney	Kalundborg	55°39′40.7″N 11°04′44.2″E	
Næstved Transmitter	722 ft	220.1 m	?	Guyed masts	Næstved	55°15′32.3″N 11°48′42.4″E	
Frejlev Transmitter	722 ft	220.1 m	?	Guyed masts	Frejlev	57°00′13.3″N 9°49′26.3″E	
Mejrup Transmitter	722 ft	220.1 m	?	Guyed masts	Holstebro	56°23′07.4″N 8°40′20″E	
Søsterhøj	709 ft	216.1 m	?	Tower	Aarhus	56°05′55.61″N 10°13′0.22″E	Partially guyed
Angissoq LORAN-C transmitter (new mast)	704 ft	214 m	1964	Guyed Mast	Angissoq, Greenland	59°59′16″N 45°10′23″W	Shut down in 1994, demolition date unknown.
Øresund Bridge	669 ft	204 m	2000	Tower	Øresund	55°34′31″N 12°49′37″E	
Måde Vestas V-164 Wind Turbines	656 ft	200 m	2016	Tower	Esbjerg	55°27′06″N 8°31′06″E	Two units, nacelle height: 118 metres, rotor diameter: 164 metres.
Østerild SWT-6.0-154 Wind Turbine	646 ft	197 m	2012	Tower	Thisted-Østerild		
LORAN-C transmitter Ejde	625 ft	190.5 m	1963	Guyed mast	Eiði, Faroe Islands	62°17′59.7″N 7°4′25.6″W	Insulated against ground, demolished in 2019.
Chimney of Studstrupværket	623 ft	189.89 m	?	Chimney	Studstrup	56°15′0.7″N 10°20′41.4″E	
Chimney of Enstedværket	593 ft	180.7 m	?	Chimney	Aabenraa	55°01′14.5″N 9°26′31.5″E	
Odinstårnet	581 ft	177 m	1935	Tower	Odense	55°23′38″N 10°19′54″E	Destroyed.
Arsballe Transmitter	575 ft	175.3 m	?	Guyed masts	Arsballe	55°08′56.9″N 14°52′43.9″E	
Chimney of Nordjyllandsværket	558 ft	170.1 m	?	Chimney	Aalborg	57°04′29.9″N 10°02′21.8″E	
Høvsøre Wind Measurement Tower	541 ft	165 m	?	Lattice tower	Høvsøre	56°27′5.96″N 8°09′8.74″E	
Transmitter Karleby	539 ft	164.29 m	?	Guyed mast	Karleby	54°52′20.5″N 11°11′48.3″E	
Felsted transmitter	530 ft	161.54 m	?	Guyed mast	Felsted	54°57′58.1″N 9°33′9.9″E	
Tholne transmitter	527 ft	160.6 m	?	Guyed mast	Tholne	57°30′02.3″N 10°18′07.3″E	
Læsø Mast	525 ft	160.02 m	?	Guyed mast	Læsø	57°16′08.1″N 11°03′9.7″E	
Simiutaq Radio Mast	516 ft	157.2 m	?	Guyed mast	Qaqortoq, Greenland	60°41′23.2″N 46°35′35.05″W	
Chimney of Asnæsværket 2	499 ft	152.1 m	?	Chimney	Kalundborg	55°39′43″N 11°04′58″E	
Tinghøj Tower	499 ft	152.1 m	?	Tower	Hobro	56°42′27.9″N 9°52′38.8″E	
Thisted transmitter	498 ft	151.8 m	?	Guyed mast	Thisted	56°58′33.4″N 8°40′55.8″E	
Ølgod transmitter	496 ft	151.2 m	?	Guyed mast	Ølgod	55°48′37.05″N 8°33′37.2″E	
Chimneys of Amagerværket	493 ft	150.27 m	?	Chimney	Copenhagen	55°41′17.06″N 12°37′34.93″E ; 55°41′12.53″N 12°37′39.9″E ; 55°41′9.17″N 12°37′38.73″E	
Chimney of Amagerforbrænding	492 ft	149.96 m	?	Chimney	Copenhagen	55°41′01.23″N 12°37′18.19″E	
Chimneys of Avedøreværket	492 ft	149.96 m	?	Chimney	Copenhagen	55°36′07.63″N 12°28′44.78″E ; 55°36′08.09″N 12°28′38.05″E	
Chimney of Vestforbrænding	489 ft	149.04 m	?	Chimney	Ejby	55°42′23″N 12°25′14″E	
Kalundborg Transmitter	482 ft	147 m	1951	Guyed mast	Kalundborg	55°40′13.92″N 11°4′37.06″E	Insulated against ground
Varde Flare Stick	476 ft	145.1 m	?	Chimney	Varde	55°40′06.1″N 8°22′0.2″E	
Lighthouse	466 ft	142 m	2012	Skyscraper	Aarhus	56.165621129432566, 10.231235808906964	Under construction
Limfjorden Powerline Crossing 2	465 ft	141.73 m	?	Electricity pylon		57°04′08.96″N 10°02′40.1″E ; 57°03′55.7″N 10°01′59.2″E	
Chimney of Fynsværket 1	463 ft	141.12 m	?	Chimney	Odense	55°25′44.5″N 10°24′27.8″E	
Akraberg transmitter	463 ft	141 m	1990	Guyed mast	Akraberg, Faroe Islands	61°23′51.84″N 6°40′58.72″W	used for broadcasting on 531 kHz
Herning transmitter	460 ft	140.2 m	?	Guyed mast	Herning	56°07′55.35″N 8°56′30.39″E	
Vejle Telecommunication Tower	448 ft	136.55 m	?	Tower	Vejle	55°40′28.9″N 9°30′7.8″E	
Chimney of Randers	436 ft	132.9 m	?	Chimney	Randers	56°27′31″N 10°02′50″E	
Chimney of Kyndby	427 ft	130.15 m	?	Chimney	Kyndby	55°48′48″N 11°52′43″E	
Chimney of Stigsnæs	427 ft	130.15 m	?	Chimney	Stigsnæs	55°12′28.7″N 11°15′06.6″E	
Wind turbines of Frederikshavn	420 ft	128 m	?	Wind turbine	Frederikshavn	57°26′51.24″N 10°33′20.21″E	4 units
Chimney of Enstedværket	419 ft	127.7 m	?	Chimney	Aabenraa	55°01′12.7″N 9°26′15″E	
Chimney of Frederiksberg Varmecentral	414 ft	126.19 m	?	Chimney	Copenhagen	55°41′0.5″N 12°31′16.8″E	
Lillebælt Powerline Crossing 2	411 ft	125.3 m	?	Electricity pylon	Middelfart	55°31′05.39″N 9°41′27.39″E	
Herstedvesteren Radio Tower	410 ft	125 m	1933	Lattice Tower	Albertslund	55°40′49″N 12°21′10″E	Wooden tower, demolished in 1975
Húsareyn TV Mast	410 ft	125 m		Guyed mast	Tórshavn, Faroe Islands	62°01′08.76″N 6°49′35.71″W	
Risø Meteorological Tower	404 ft	123.14 m	?	Guyed mast	Risø	55°41′39.2″N 12°05′17.8″E	Mast for meteorological measurements
New Lillebælt Bridge	401 ft	122.22 m	1970	Bridge	Lillebælt	55°31′11″N 9°44′41.4″E ; 55°31′4.3″N 9°45′15″E	
Wind turbines of Østhavn	400 ft	121.92 m	?	Wind turbine	Aalborg	57°02′20.6″N 10°04′32.4″E	6 units
Chimney of Kalundborg Statoil	398 ft	121.31 m	?	Chimney	Kalundborg	55°39′13″N 11°06′01″E	
Wind turbine of Blåhøj	394 ft	120.09 m	?	Wind turbine	Blåhøj	55°52′18″N 9°00′23″E	
Chimney of Dansk-Norsk Kvælstoffabrik	394 ft	120.09 m	1960	Chimney	Grenå	56°24′48.3″N 10°54′50.1″E	
Chimneys of Rørdal	394 ft	120.09 m	?	Chimney	Aalborg	57°03′35.7″N 9°58′35.7″E	
Rønland Wind Turbines	394 ft	120.09 m	?	Wind turbines	Rønland	56°40′13″N 8°12′58″E	8 units
Chimney of Fredericia Superfos	394 ft	120.09 m	?	Chimney	Fredericia		
Chimney of Lygten	394 ft	120.09 m	?	Chimney	Copenhagen	55°42′25.1″N 12°32′22.9″E	
Roskilde Forbrænding	394 ft	120.09 m	?	Chimney	Roskilde	55°38′30″N 12°07′16″E	
Nakskov Wind Turbines	394 ft	120.09 m	?	Wind turbines	Nakskov	54°49′09″N 11°06′20″E	
Chimneys of Skærbækværket	394 ft	120.09 m	?	Chimney	Skærbæk	55°30′41″N 9°36′55″E ; 55°30′40″N 9°36′42.5″E	
Lillebælt Powerline Crossing 1	392 ft	119.5 m	?	Electricity pylon	Middelfart	55°31′05.44″N 9°41′31.31″E	
Lillebælt Powerline Crossing 2	391 ft	119.2 m	?	Electricity pylon	Middelfart	55°31′35.9″N 9°41′26.43″E	
Kalundborg Transmitter	387 ft	118 m	1927	Tower	Kalundborg	55°40′39.27″N 11°4′8.6″E ; 55°40′32.91″N 11°4′14.33″E	2 towers
Herlev Hospital	383 ft	116.73 m	1965–1975	Skyscraper	Herlev	55°43′53.6″N 12°26′39″E	
Chimney of DLG	381 ft	116.13 m	?	Chimney	Aarhus	56°09′05.6″N 10°13′03.6″E	
Chimney of Måbjergværket	381 ft	116.13 m	?	Chimney	Holstebro	56°23′40.5″N 8°37′07″E	
Chimney of Ørstedsværket	380 ft	115.82 m	?	Chimney	Copenhagen	55°39′22″N 12°33′24″E	
Høvsøre Wind Measurement Tower	374 ft	114 m	?	Lattice tower	Høvsøre	56°26′38.71″N 8°09′5.87″E	
Lillebælt Powerline Crossing 1	371 ft	113.1 m	?	Electricity pylon	Middelfart	55°31′35.98″N 9°41′29.76″E	
Chimney of Nordjyllandsværket	368 ft	112.17 m	?	Chimney	Aalborg	57°04′23.9″N 10°02′29″E ; 57°04′26.55″N 10°02′25.9″E	
Chimney of KFK	368 ft	112.17 m	?	Chimney	Aarhus	56°09′06.6″N 10°13′08.7″E	
himney of Midtkraft	368 ft	112.2 m	?	Chimney	Aarhus	56°09′4.65″N 10°12′44″E	
Wind turbines of Nordjyllandsværket	365 ft	111.25 m	?	Wind turbine	Aalborg	57°04′48.82″N 10°01′50.94″E	6 units
Wind turbines of Middlegrunden	365 ft	111.25 m	?	Wind turbine	Copenhagen	55°42′25.07″N 12°40′06.14″E	20 units
Wind turbines of Nysted Havmøllepark	361 ft	110.03 m	?	Wind turbine	Nysted	54°34′10.23″N 11°40′02.16″E	72 units
Large Masts of Herstedvesteren Shortwave Transmitter	361 ft	110 m	1948	Guyed Mast	Albertslund	55°40′52″N 12°21′05″E	3 guyed masts built of wood, demolished in 1975
Lindø Shipyard Crane	361 ft	110.03 m	?	Crane	Odense	55°27′55″N 10°31′37″E	
Varde Chimney	361 ft	110.03 m	?	Chimney	Varde	55°40′16.3″N 8°22′14.5″E	
Wind turbines of Horns Rev	360 ft	109.7 m	?	Wind turbine	Horns Rev	55°30′11.52″N 7°47′46.93″E	80 units
Chimney of Fredericia Shell refinery	358 ft	109.11 m	?	Chimney	Fredericia	55°35′31″N 9°44′55″E	
Aarhus Havn Cranes	356 ft	108.5 m	?	Crane	Aarhus	56°08′45″N 10°13′50″E	
Margreteholm Mast	355 ft	108.2 m	?	Guyed mast	Copenhagen	55°41′12″N 12°36′47.2″E	
Chimney Vamdrup	355 ft	108.2 m	?	Chimney	Vamdrup	55°25′41.4″N 9°18′01″E	
Domus Vista	351 ft	107 m	1969	Building	Copenhagen	55°40′16″N 12°30′20″E	Tallest residential structure in Denmark
Transmitter Dronninglund	350 ft	106.7 m	?	Guyed mast	Dronninglund	57°08′49″N 10°13′08″E	
Transmitter Brønderslev	350 ft	106.7 m	?	Guyed mast	Brønderslev	57°16′33″N 9°58′38″E	
Transmitter Faaborg	350 ft	106.7 m	?	Guyed mast	Faaborg	55°06′45″N 10°13′05″E	
Transmitter Køge	350 ft	106.7 m	?	Guyed mast	Køge	55°28′28″N 12°11′29″E	
Transmitter Maribo	350 ft	106.7 m	?	Guyed mast	Maribo	54°46′41.5″N 11°30′28.2″E	
Transmitter Ringkøbing	350 ft	106.7 m	?	Guyed mast	Ringkøbing	56°05′34.7″N 8°16′58.3″E	
Transmitter Tranebjerg	350 ft	106.7 m	?	Guyed mast	Tranebjerg	55°51′20.6″N 10°32′42.7″E	
Transmitter Blykobbe	348 ft	106.07 m	?	Lattice Tower	Blykobbe	55°08′04.5″N 14°42′44.6″E	
Transmitter Brande	348 ft	106.07 m	?	Guyed mast	Brande	55°56′20″N 9°05′42″E	
Valby Gasværk	348 ft	106.07 m	?	Gasometer	Copenhagen	55°38′35″N 12°30′28″E	
Chimney of Brande Biomar	345 ft	105.16 m	?	Chimney	Brande	55°56′56″N 9°07′35″E	
Chimney of Fredercia Superfos	345 ft	105.16 m	?	Chimney	Fredericia		
Wind turbine Ejstrupholm	345 ft	105.16 m	?	Wind turbine	Brejl	56°00′38.5″N 9°17′02″E	
Transmitter Hørret	345 ft	105.16 m	?	Lattice Tower	Hørret	56°05′47″N 10°12′19″E	
Transmitter Kalvslund	345 ft	105.16 m	?	Guyed mast	Kalvslund	55°22′47.2″N 8°51′44.2″E	
Transmitter Ringsted	345 ft	105.16 m	?	Guyed mast	Ringsted	55°28′19″N 11°47′53″E	
Transmitter Skanderberg	345 ft	105.16 m	?	Lattice tower	Skanderberg	56°2′25.5″N 10°0′8.2″E	
Transmitter Snoghøj	345 ft	105.16 m	?	Guyed mast	Snoghøj	55°31′33.3″N 9°42′52.5″E	
Chimney of Vejen	345 ft	105.16 m	?	Chimney	Vejen	55°28′26″N 9°09′24″E	
Copenhagen Town Hall	344 ft	104.9 m	?	Building	Copenhagen	55°40′31″N 12°34′12″E	
Transmitter Egebjerg	342 ft	103.9 m	?	Guyed mast	Egebjerg	54°45′30″N 11°59′01.5″E	
Transmitter Skive	342 ft	103.9 m	?	Guyed mast	Skive	56°34′03.7″N 9°02′47.2″E	
Carlsberg Brewery factory	341 ft	104.25 m	?	Building with chimney	Copenhagen	55°39′55″N 12°32′04″E ; 55°40′03″N 12°32′07″E	
Transmitter Blåvand	338 ft	103 m	?	Guyed mast	Blåvand	55°33′41″N 8°07′00″E	
Transmitter Herstedvester	338 ft	103 m	?	Guyed mast	Herstedvester	55°40′52″N 12°21′15″E	
Transmitter Holbæk	338 ft	103 m	?	Guyed mast	Holbæk	55°41′55″N 11°43′52″E	
Transmitter Ragebøl	338 ft	103 m	?	Guyed mast	Ragebøl	54°55′24″N 9°44′09″E	
Wind turbines Hagesholm	338 ft	103 m	?	Wind turbines	Hagesholm	55°45′58.77″N 11°34′04.90″E	6 units
Towers of Farø-Falster-Bridge	338 ft	103 m	?	Bridge towers	Farø	54°56′40.7″N 11°58′34.7″E ; 54°56′33.6″N 11°58′23.9″E	
Wind turbines of Paludans Flak	336 ft	102.41 m	?	Wind turbines	Paludans Flak	55°44′03″N 10°35′00″E	
Aarhus Cathedral	335 ft	102.1 m	?	Church tower	Aarhus	56°09′25″N 10°12′36″E	
Transmitter Bovbjerg	335 ft	102.1 m	?	Guyed mast	Bovbjerg	56°31′48″N 8°10′00″E	
Transmitter Fornæs	335 ft	102.1 m	?	Guyed mast	Fornæs	56°26′50″N 10°56′45″E	
NMT Nyborg	334 ft	101.8 m	?	Guyed mast	Nyborg	55°18′14″N 10°48′31″E	
Limfjorden Powerline Crossing 1	332 ft	101.19 m	?	electricity pylon		57°04′16.9″N 10°02′28.06″E ; 57°04′05.11″N 10°01′51.29″E	
Chimney of Svanemølleværket	331 ft	100.9 m	?	Chimney	Copenhagen	55°42′48″N 12°35′17″E	
Hjørring DECCA-Transmitter	330 ft	100.6 m	?	Guyed mast	Hjørring	57°26′53″N 10°03′05″E	insulated against ground, demolished
Højer DECCA-Transmitter, large mast	330 ft	100.6 m	?	Guyed mast	Højer	55°01′4.7″N 8°41′33.9″E	insulated against ground, demolished.
Klintholm DECCA-Transmitter	330 ft	100.6 m	?	Guyed mast	Klintholm	54°57′22″N 12°27′56″E	insulated against ground, demolished
Samsø DECCA-Transmitter	330 ft	100.6 m	?	Guyed mast	Samsø	55°56′36″N 10°34′58″E	insulated against ground, demolished
Large Masts of Skamlebæk Radio Station	328 ft	100 m	1931	Guyed Mast	Odsherred	55°50′10″N 11°25′20″E	4 guyed masts built of wood, demolished
Radioøen Radio Mast	328 ft	100 m	?	Guyed mast	Nuuk, Greenland	64°02′09″N 52°04′37″W	
Chimney Lisbjerg	328 ft	100 m	?	Chimney	Lisbjerg	56°13′42″N 10°09′28″E	
Chimney Usserød	328 ft	100 m	?	Chimney	Usserød	55°54′01″N 12°29′30″E	

== See also ==
- List of tallest buildings in Denmark
