= Døndalen =

Valley in the northern part of the Danish island of Bornholm

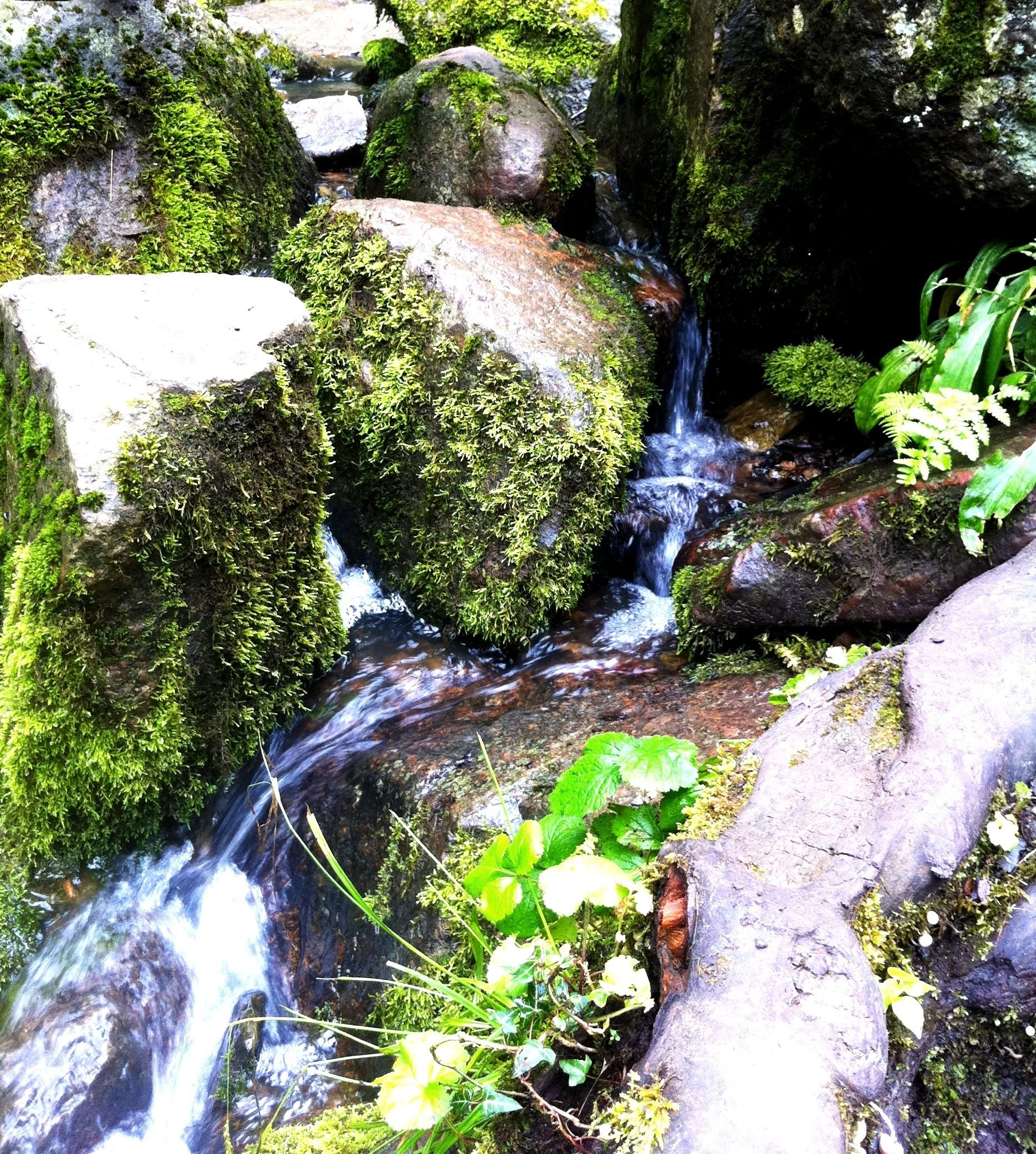
- The waterfall in Døndalen, Bornholm.

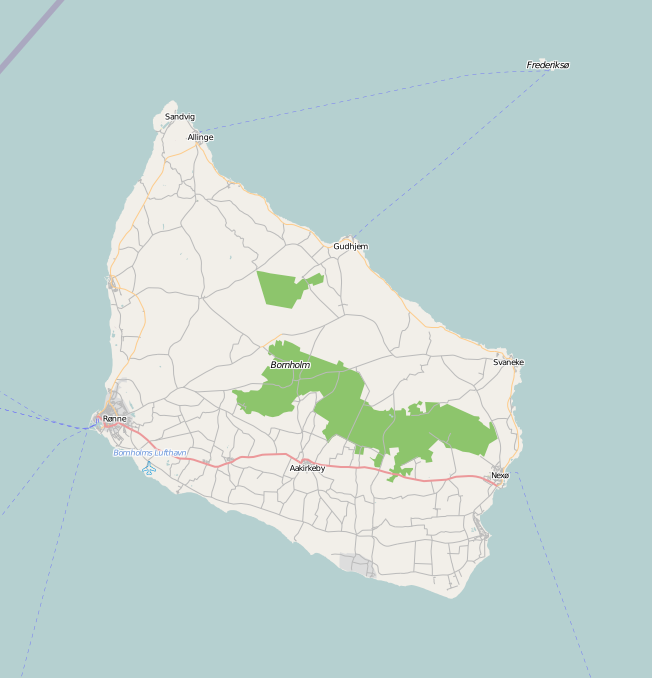
- Location within Bornholm Location within Denmark

Geography
- Coordinates: 55°13′40″N 14°53′00″E
- Interactive map of Døndalen

Døndalen is a valley in the northern part of the Danish island of Bornholm. Located next to the road from Gudhjem to Tejn, it is known for its waterfall, which is Denmark's tallest.

== Description ==
Døndalen, which covers an area of 37 hectares (91 acres), is one of Bornholm's crack valleys cutting through the granite rock. The wooded area reaches inland from the coast. In springtime the valley is covered with anemones and ramsons, and the song of nightingales can sometimes be heard.

== Background ==
Døndalen has been wooded since the last ice age, 10,000 years ago. Over the past 7,000 years, the trees have been deciduous. There have been various archeological finds in the valley including burial sites and evidence of cremations. It is not known how a sword in a wooden sheath and gilded pearls of glass arrived there. As part of the island's defences in the 16th century, earthworks were constructed at the bottom of the valley next to the shore. The embankments, which can still be seen today, provided protection for those using canons and rifles to deter the enemy.

== Landscape ==
Half way up the valley, the brook known as Døndaleåen falls some 20 metres (66 ft), forming Denmark's largest waterfall. The rocky banks on the northwestern side rise 25 metres (82 ft) to the Amtmandsstenen viewpoint which looks out over the Baltic Sea to Christiansø. The brook runs from Dammemose near Klemensker via Spellinge Mose. The stretch from Røvejen (the road from Rø to Olsker) to the coast has varying scenery and the waterfall. For most of the year, there is only a trickle of water in the brook, but in winter the waterfall is fuller.

== Fauna and flora ==
Døndalen has several examples of birdlife, particularly in the spring with nightingales, blackcaps, garden warblers, treecreepers and chaffinches. Buzzards. In the winter months, dippers feed in the stream. Deer are also present in the woods. Salmon and other fish occupy the stream.

In addition to the ramsons and white, yellow and blue anemones, there are arum and toothworts. On occasion, some orchids can be seen, including the marsh orchid and twayblade. Trees include hornbeam, silver birch, ash, elm and hazel as well as several varieties of rowan. In 1916, Aksel Jensen, a farmer, cultivated the northeastern side of Døndalen. His interest in trees led him to plant approximately 150 varieties from around the world. They include Chinese cork oak, Californian mammoth trees, Himalayan spruce and also a rare European variety, the chequer tree.

== Signposted walks ==
From the car park on the main road from Gudhjem to Tejn, there are signposted footpaths through the valley taking visitors through Aksel Jensen's plantation with trees, along the valley and past the waterfall. The viewpoint at Amtmandssten can be reached up a flight of steps. On the other side of the road, the path along the coast leads to the high granite cliffs known as Helligdomsklipperne.

== See also ==
- List of waterfalls
