= Store Kongensgade 59 =

Listed building in Copenhagen

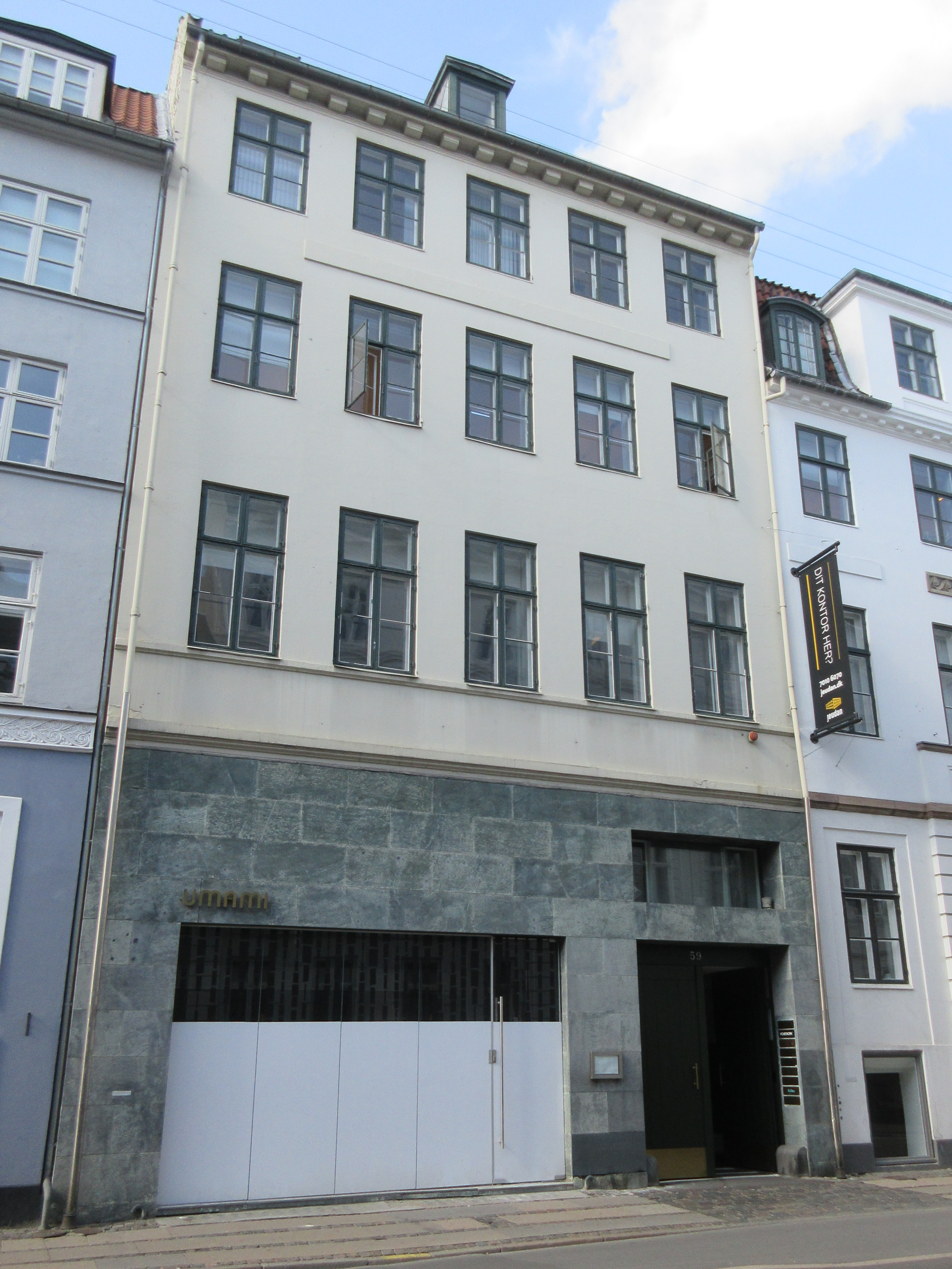
- The southern of the two buildings fronting the street
- Interactive map of the Store Kongensgade 59 area

General information
- Architectural style: Neoclassical
- Location: Copenhagen, Denmark
- Coordinates: 55°41′3.7″N 12°35′14.78″E
- Completed: 1782 and later

Store Kongensgade 59 is a late 18th to early 19th-century building complex, surrounding a central courtyard, situated on Store Kongensgade in Copenhagen, Denmark. It consists of two five-bay buildings fronting the street, two side wings and two rear wings. The northern (right) front wing dates from 1782 while the other buildings were added some time after 1800. The two buildings fronting the street were jointly listed in the Danish registry of protected buildings and places in 1918. Notable former residents include author Knud Lyne Rahbek, politicians Niels Rosenkrantz and Johan Sigismund von Møsting, landscape painter Georg Emil Libert, businessman Alfred Hage and actor Arthur Andersen.

== History ==
=== 18th century ===
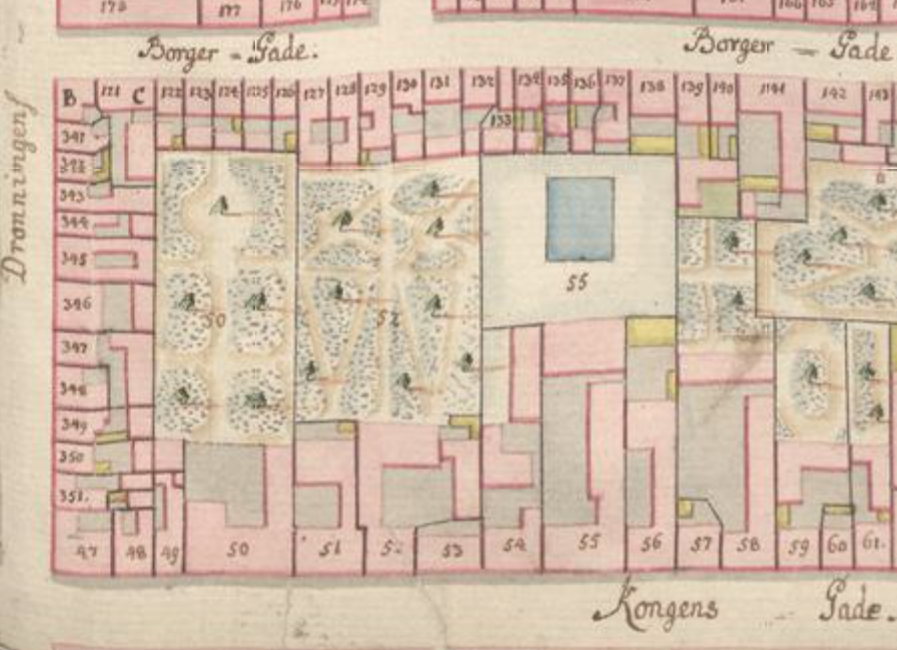
No. 52-53 seen in a detail from Christian Gedde's map of St. Ann's West Quarter, 1757

The property is located in an area formerly known as New Copenhagen, which was not incorporated into the fortified city until the 1670s. The site was initially part of a larger property. When Copenhagen's first cadastre was introduced in 1689, it was listed as No. 150 in Sankt Ann's West Quarter and belonged to Casper Ubelax. As of 1756 the site was made up of two smaller properties, No. 52 and No. 53, which were both owned by naval commander Nicolai Dominicus Arff (1695–1758). He was the father of counter admiral Johan Gerhard Arff.

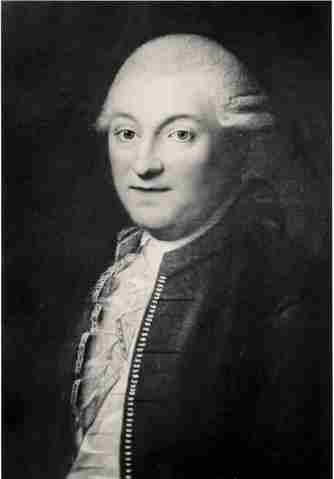
Jacob Madsen Rahbek

The northern of the two buildings fronting the street was constructed with three storeys in 1782 for justice councillor Jacob Rahbek (1728–1795). At the time of the 1787 census, No. 52/53 was home to 34 residents in three households. Rahbech resided in the building with his third wife Anne Olrog Rahbech, ten children from his first marriage (aged three to 16), his mother-in-law Agnete Ackermann, an office clerk (skriverkarl), a male servant, a female cook and two maids. Poul Rosenørn (1756–1829), another high-ranking customs officer (deputeret i General Toldkammeret), resided in the building with his son, a housekeeper, a male servant and a maid. Peder Rosenstand Giuske, a prosecutor general (overgeneralauditør) at the Supreme Court and director ad censor of the Royal Danish Theatre, resided in the building with his wife Frideriche Amalia Koor, their two children (aged four and six), two office clerks, a housekeeper, a female cook and two maids.

One of Rahbech's ten children was the future writer Knud Lyne Rahbek. He lived in the building on and off until settling in Bakkehuset after marrying Kamma Rahbek in 1797.

=== 19th century ===
At the time of the 1801 census, No. 52 was home to 32 residents in four households. Lorentz Berner, another customs officer, resided in the building with his wife Lucie Wedege, their three-year-old son Christian Berner, a servant and three maids. Christian Kayerød, a kitchen accountant (køkkenskriver), resided in another apartment with his wife Marie Møller. His son, Georg Severin Katerød (1672–1743), a pharmacist, would later found the second pharmacy in Aalborg, where he is commemorated with a well-known fountain. Frederik and Anne Marie Hoffmann, Kayerød's daughter and son-in law, resided in the third apartment with their three-year-old daughter Frederikke Hoffmann, the building's caretaker and three maids. Carl Wilhelm Bang, a captain, resided in the building with his wife Anna Marie Berner (née Bang), two sons (aged 14 and 20) from the wife's first marriage (with brewer and tanner Johan Conrad Fribert 1733–1788), nephews Niels Christian Bang Grundtvig (also a nephew of Nikolai Frederik Severin Grundtvig, 1777–1810) and Carl Wilhelm Bang (1794–1751), a male servant and three maids. The eldest of the two sons, Lorentz Fribert (1781–1714), would later purchase the manor house Annebjerggaard in Odsherred, but died just four years later.

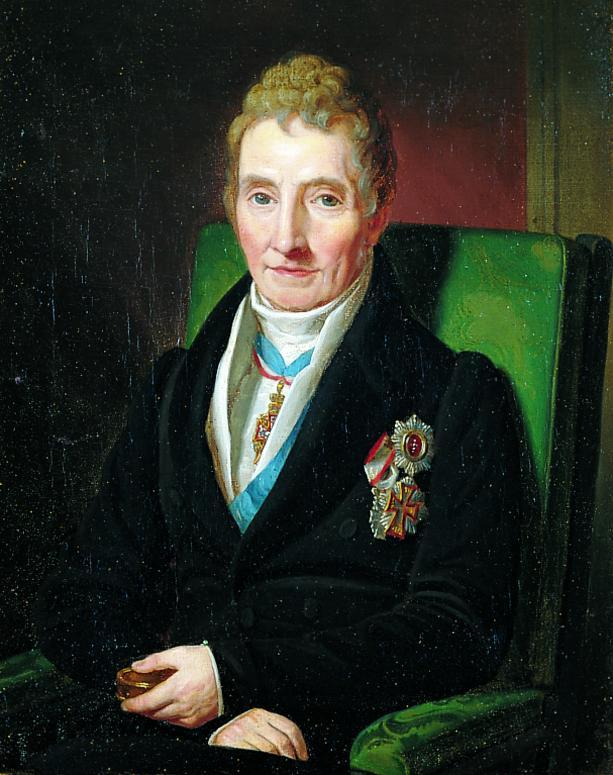
Johan Sigismund von Møsting

In the new cadastre of 1806, the property was listed as No. 53 in St. Ann's West Quarter. It was owned then by one merchant (grosserer) Zinn. It is unclear what member of the Zinn family the owner was. Johan Friederich Zinn, a son of Johann Ludvig Zinn, owned the Zinn House in Kvæsthusgade. Johan Ludwig Friederich Zinn, his cousin, who was licensed as a wine merchant, owned the Danneskiold-Laurvig Mansion on Store Kongensgade from 1799 to 1810. A number of other cousins from were also active in Copenhagen around the same time.

The politician and diplomat Niels Rosenkrantz (1757–1824) was a resident of the building in 1808. Future prime minister Johan Sigismund von Møsting (1759–1843) was a resident of the building around 1811. The clergyman and theological writer (1792–1862) resided on the second floor in 1816. The naval officer and historical writer Hans Georg Garde (1790–1875) was a resident of the building from 1831 to 1834.

It is unclear when and for whom Rahbek's building was expanded. It is not unlikely that it took place in stages. It is however clear from census records from 1840 that the expansion into a substantial complex—consisting of two buildings fronting the street, two side wings, two rear wings, and an intermediate wing which divided the central space into two smaller courtyards—had by then been completed. The property was owned at the time by Peter Wilhelm Eckert, a cartwright and captain in the Fire Corps, from 1821 to 1839 with predicate of Court Wheelwright, whose carriage workshop was also located at the site. Peter Wilhelm Eckert's father Hendrich Ekkert had held the predicate of Court Wheelwright from 1801 to 1819. The Eckert family's home and workshop had in 1801 been situated at No. 154 in Købmager Quarter (Gammel Mønt 22m demolished). It is likely that either Eckert or his father at some point moved the family business to Store Kongensgade. At the time of the 1940 census, Eckert's property in Store Kongensgade was home to more than 80 people. Two of his tenants, a master joiner (snedkermester) and a master blacksmith, were most likely acting as subcontractors. Peter Vilhelm Eckert resided on the ground floor of the northern front wing (Rahbek's building) with his wife Marie Sophie Kyhl and two maids. The 12 residents of the southern front wing were either employees from his carriage workshop or servants associated with his household. Anna Beate Haxthausen, the 65-year-old widow of Frederik Julius von Haxthausen, a general major in the Royal Danish Army, resided on the first floor of the northern front wing with three unmarried children (aged 26 to 35), a male servant and two maids. Edle Matilde Kofoed, the 64-year-old widow of a naval commander, resided on the second floor with her niece Inger Marie Krausen and two maids. Marius Christian Ager, one of Princess Juliane's lackeys, resided on the third floor with four unmarried children (aged 17 to 25), one lodger and one maid. Iver Valentin Ditlef Popp, who worked for the Bank of Denmark (as a stempelforvalter), resided on the first and second floor of the southern front wing with his wife Anne Marie Popp, their 21-year-old son, two maids and six more employees at the carriage workshop. Christine Sophie Møller, a 67-year-old widow, resided on the first floor of the rear wing with her son Carl August Møller (an architect), two joiner's apprentices and one maid. Sophie Friis, another widow, resided on the second floor of the rear wing with her four children (aged eight to 17), her 40-year-old sister, another 72-year-old widow and one maid. Robert Allen, a "silver stainer", resided on the ground floor of the intermediate wing (mellembygningen) with his wife Karen Allen and their two sons (aged 19 and 29). Johan Christian Liebert, a master joiner (snedkermester) resided on the first floor of the intermediate wing with his wife Else Malene Liebert, their seven children (aged three to 20), three lodgers and one maid. The eldest son was the then 20-year-old landscape painter Georg Emil Libert. Peter Schauenborg, a courier, resided on the first floor of the northern side wing with his wife Juliane Marie Rasmussen and their three children (aged 18 to 24). Niels Daniel Holm, a master blacksmith, resided on the ground floor of the side wing with his wife Sophie Frederike Ibsen, their three children (aged two to 15), a lodger, three smiths, a smith's apprentice and a maid.

In 1842, Alfred Hage (1803–1872) was among the residents. In 1843, Steen Andersen Bille (1797–1883) was among the residents.

At the time of the 1845 census, No. 53 was home to a total of 97 people distributed among 15 households. The 65-year-old Eckert had by then retired. His workshop had been taken over by Johanns Ludevig Røber, a 28-year-old unmarried cartwright, who resided in the northern side wing with three cartwrights, two cartwright's apprentices and a maid. Teui Jenni Cooper Strandgaard, a captain from the Danish West Indies, was now residing in the apartment on the first floor with his wife Georgia Louise Elisa Strandgaard, their four children (aged 10 to 18), the lady's companion Sophie Brown, two maids and a black servant. The family was back on Saint Croix the following year. Johan Horca, a royal cook (kongelig mundkok), resided on the ground floor of the southern front wing with his wife Birgitte Hedevig (née Bruun), their five-year-old daughter, his 65-year-old mother and one maid. Christian Holger Thomas von Eyben, a former captain in the Queen's Life Regiment, resided on the first floor of the southern front wing with his wife Charlotte Cronhelm, their two daughters (aged seven and 12) and two maids. The master joiner Liebert and the master blacksmith Holm were still among the tenants. They had now been joined by a master painter, Lars Christian Lunde, on the ground floor of the southern side wing.

Knud Faber (1862–1956), a professor of medicine at the University of Copenhagen, resided on the first floor from 1896 to 1900.

=== 20th century ===
A/S Thomas B. Thrige's branch in Copenhagen was based in the building in 1919.

The actor Arthur Jensen (1897–1981) lived with his parents in the basement of one of the rear wings (No. 59C) from 1906 to 1909. Nordisk Kontoretablering, a subsidiary of Transatlantisk Kompagni, was also based in the building at this point.

The United Shoe Machinery Company A/S, a subsidiary of Boston-based United Shoe Machinery Corporation, was based in the building from 1909 until at least 1950. Oscar Peschardt & Co., a timber and veneer business founded in 1902, was also based in the complex by 1950.

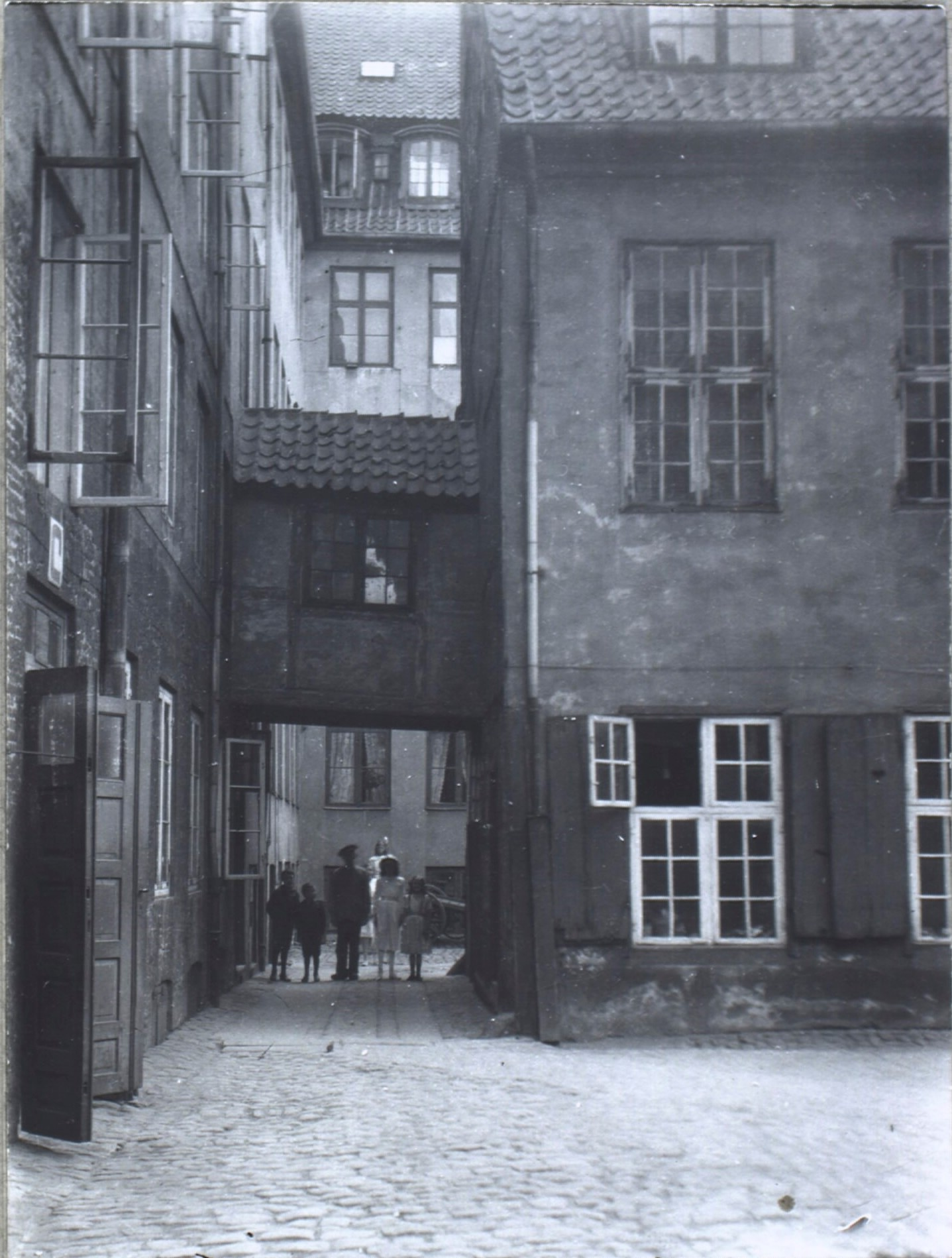
The courtyard with part of the intermediate wing (Mellembygningen)

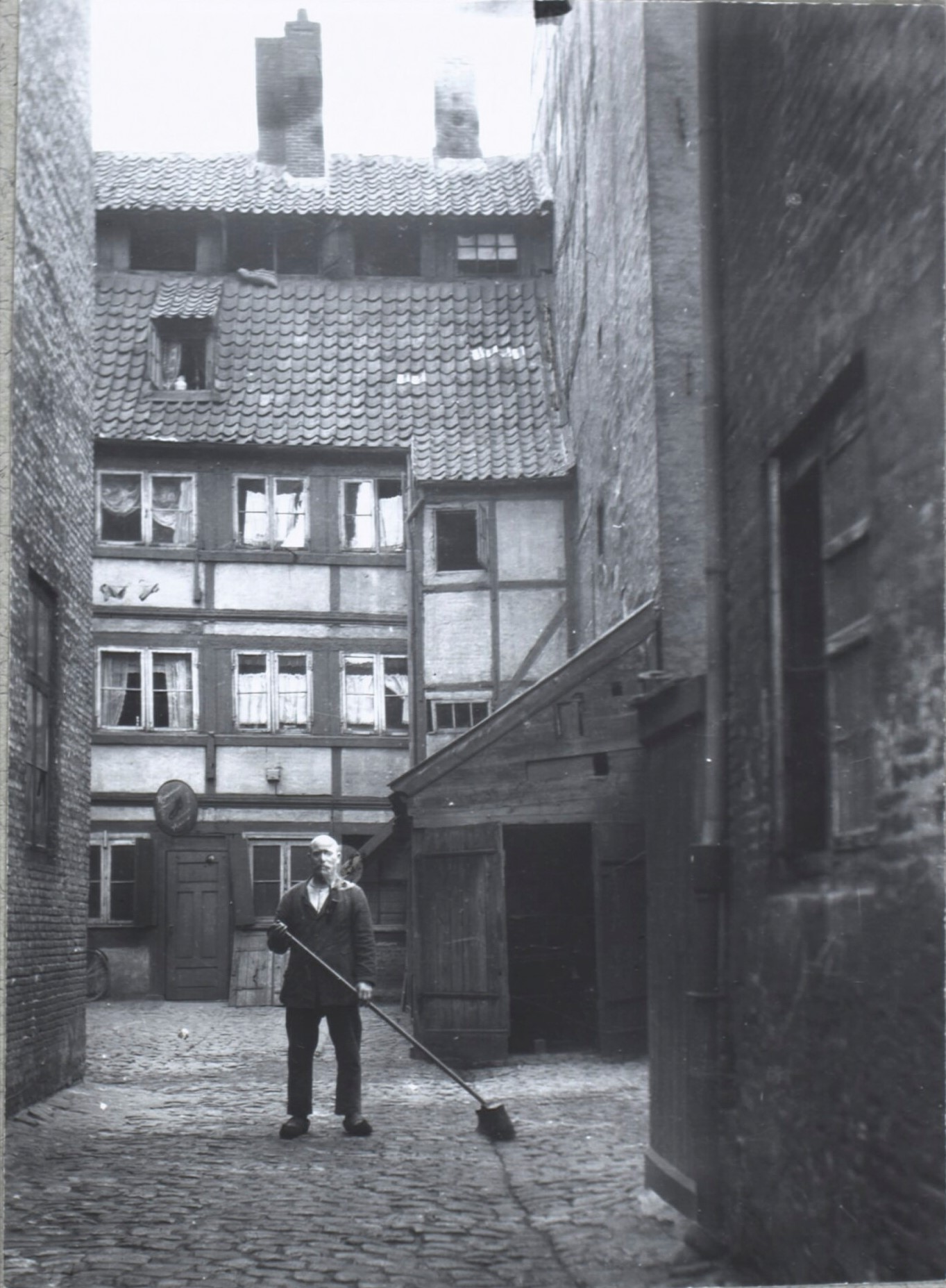

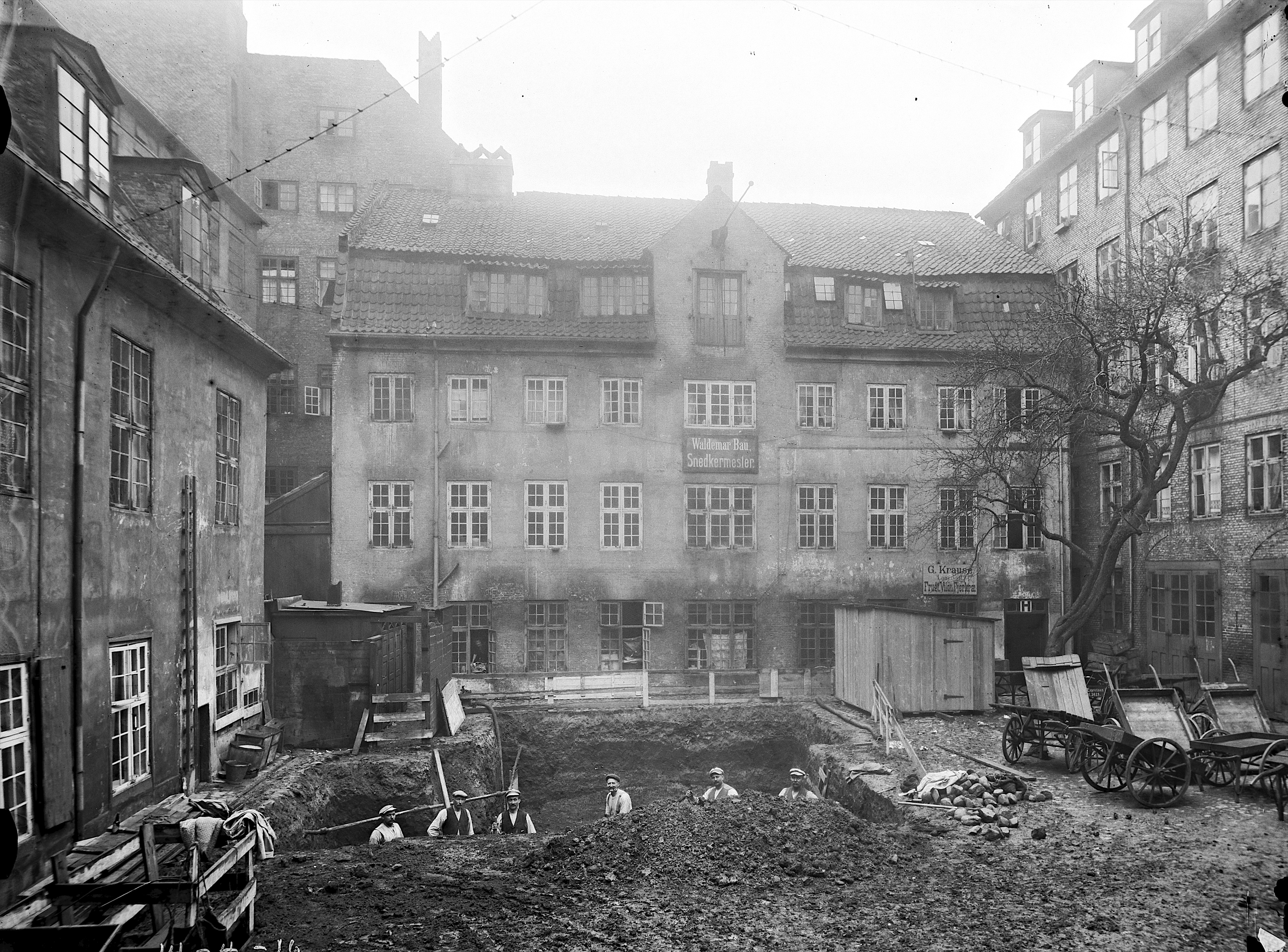
The courtyard in 1916 with a sign reading "Waldemar Bau, Snedkermester"

== Architecture ==
The complex consists of two five-bay buildings fronting the street, two long side wings and two rear wings. The building that used to divide the central space into two smaller courtyards has been demolished.

The northern building from 1782 was originally constructed with three storeys above a walk-out basement. The facade is finished with a granite belt course above the ground floor, a Vitruvian scroll frieze between the three central windows, flanked by blank friezes bands between the outer windows, between the first and second floors, and a modillioned cornice. The three central bays are up to the first floor windows accented with a slightly projecting median risalit finished with shadow joints. The roof features a three-bay wall dormer, flanked by an arched dormer window on each side.

The southern front wing has also been expanded to four storeys. The facade is on the upper floors, which is rendered in a pale yellow colour contrasted by the brown window frames; it features a sill course below the first floor windows, a blank, recessed band between the three central windows of the two upper floors, and a modillioned cornice. The ground floor is faced with a fairly smooth stone cladding.

== Today ==
Store Kongensgade 59 has been owned by Jeudan since at least 2008. Bertelsen & Scheving Arkitekter, an architectural firm, is among the residents.

== See also ==
- Brøndumgård
