= Rø Transmitter =

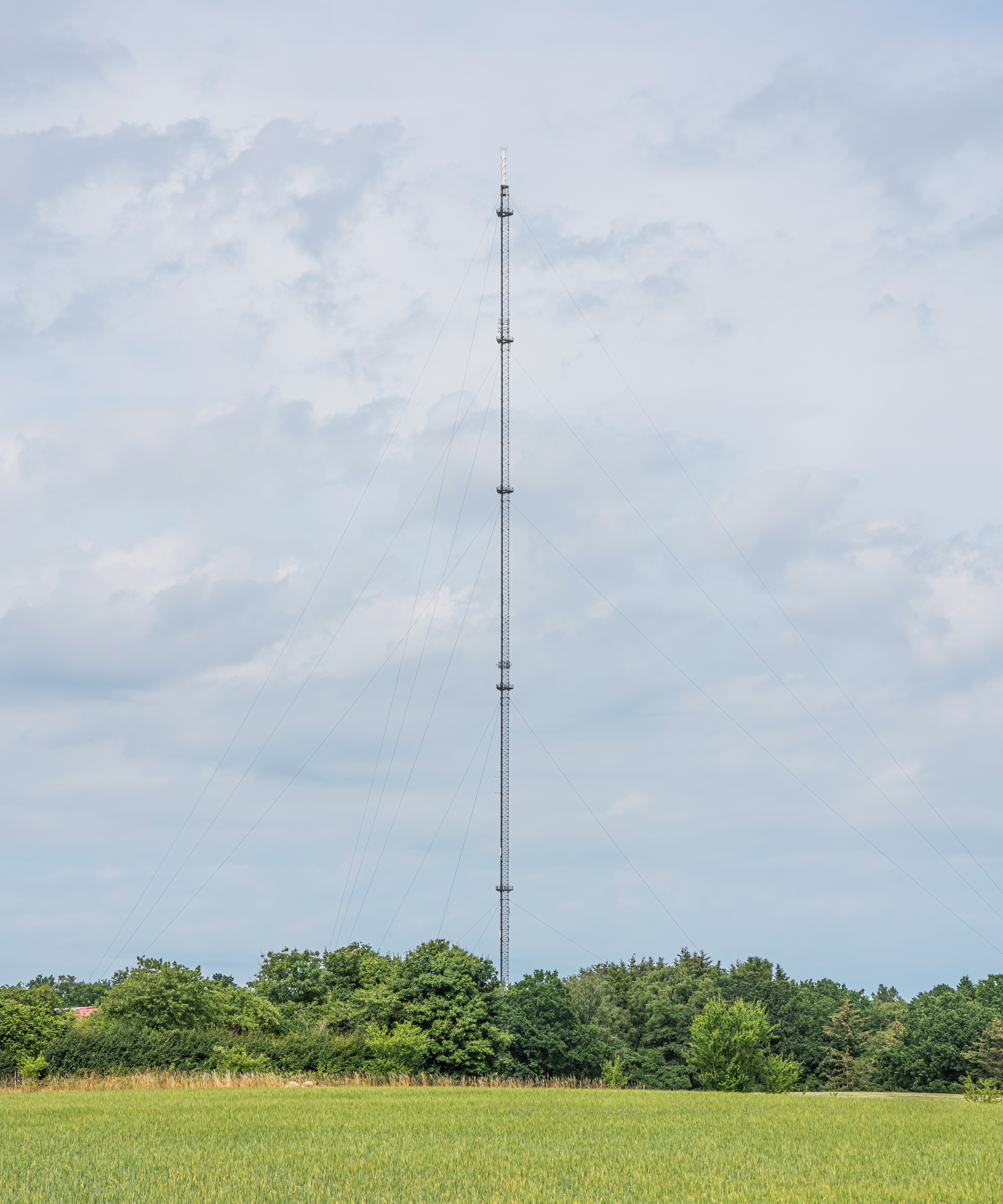

- Location within Denmark

General information
- Status: Completed
- Type: Mast
- Location: Rø, Bornholm
- Coordinates: 55°09′36″N 14°53′13″E

Height
- Height: 315.8 m (1,036.09 ft)

Rø Transmitter is a facility for FM- and TV-transmission at Rø, Denmark, situated on Bornholm island. It uses as antenna tower a 315.8-metre-tall (1,036 ft) guyed mast. The top of the mast of Rø Transmitter is 431.3 metres above sea level. It is therefore the highest point in Denmark (except Faroe Islands and Greenland).

== See also ==
- List of masts
- List of tallest structures in Denmark
