= Østerild Wind Turbine Test Field =

Wind turbine testing area in Denmark

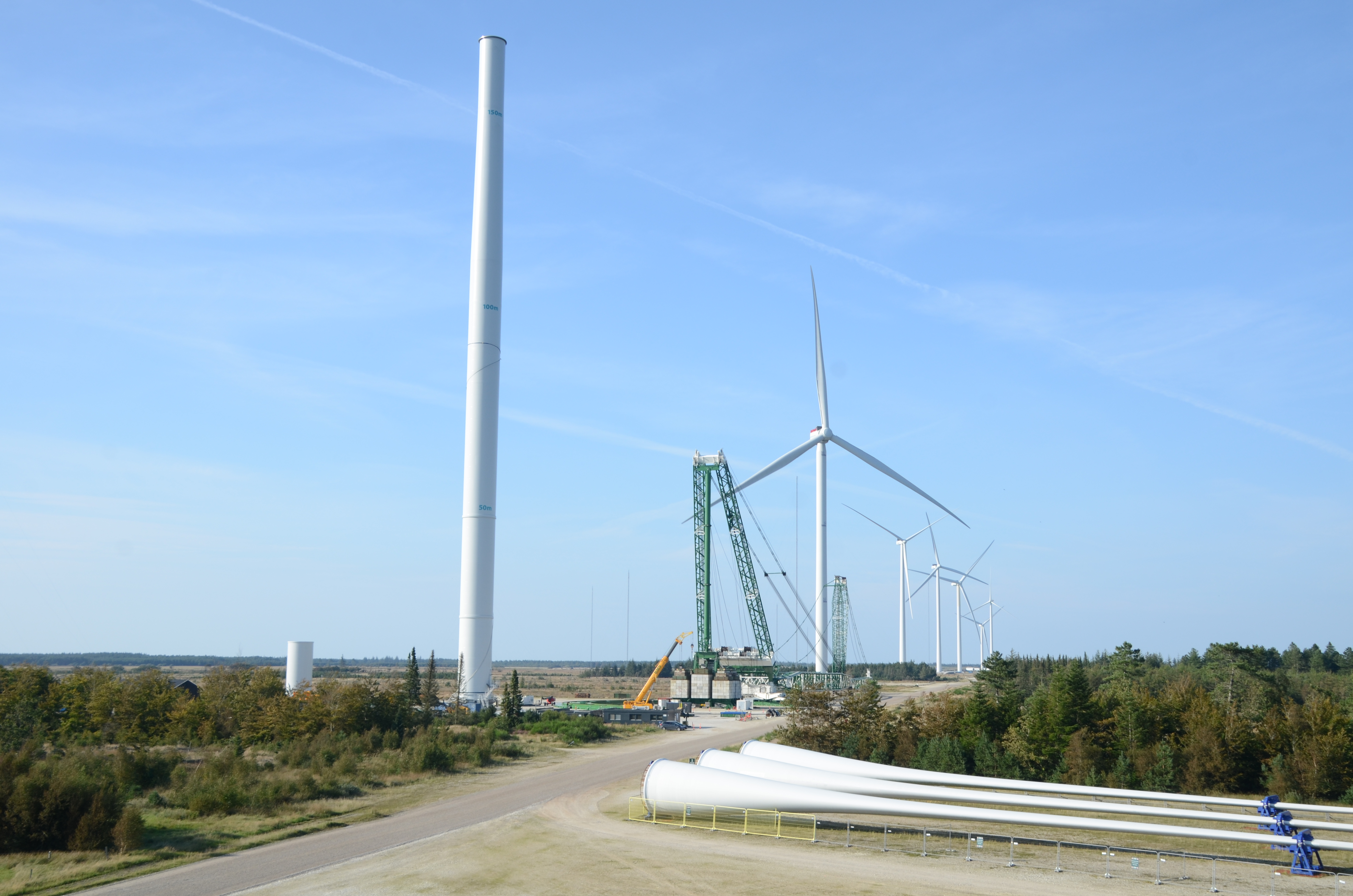
Some of the turbines in 2024. The distance between them is about 600 meters.

Østerild Wind Turbine Test Field (alternatively Risø) is a facility managed by the DTU Risø Campus of the Technical University of Denmark (DTU) for testing of offshore wind turbines with a pinnacle height up to 330 metres (1,080 ft) near Thisted-Østerild, Denmark.

== History ==
The area was plagued by flying sand from about 1450, and a plantation was started from 1889 to keep the sand in check.

The international IEC 61400 standard specifies how to design and validate wind turbines to gain commercial value. A suitable area for testing wind turbines must have good wind, a specific surface roughness, a clear area around the site, and not be in an EU Special Protection Area. After investigating 17 areas and drawing criticism, the Folketing decided in June 2010 to establish a wind turbine test center at Østerild. It was inaugurated in 2012, and is popular among tourists. A visitor center opened in 2017, and had 50,000 visitors in 2020. There is a 50 kW charging station. The current turbines reached a height of 240 metres in 2020; the Danish wind industry would like a new site capable of turbines up to 400 metres to be developed; at the end of 2024 Siemens Gamesa had a 170-metre tower built intended for a 21MW prototype under the HIPPOW project of the EC Innovation Fund

New ponds and open areas have improved conditions for bats. The first sea eagles came to the area in 2015.

== Description ==
There are 9 test stands, and each test stand has its own meteorological mast due west. Some stands were not yet put in use in 2015. In 2016, the wind turbine industry requested more stands to fulfill future test requirements. The turbines are not permanent, but spend some months in test at the site before being replaced by the next turbines.

At the northern and the southern end of the test field, there are two 250-metre-tall (820 ft) guyed masts equipped with lamps to warn aircraft.

The masts are situated at 57.087056°N 8.880673°E and at 57.048882°N 8.880799°E.

== List of sites ==
Test sites as of December 2015 :

Test stand	Type	Manufacturer	Construction year	Hub height	Rotor diameter	Total height	Power	Coordinates	References and remarks
1	Alstom Wind 151-6	EDF Énergies Nouvelles	2016	104 m	151 m	180 metres (590 ft)	6 MW	57.084379°N 8.883640°E	
2	Vestas V164-8.0	Vestas Wind Systems	2014	140 m	164 m	222 metres (728 ft)	8.0 MW	57.079003°N 8.883576°E	
3	Vestas V126-3.3	Vestas Wind Systems		116 m	126 m	179 metres (587 ft)	3.3 MW	57.0736855°N 8.884169°E	
4	Vestas V110-2.0	Vestas Wind Systems		98 m	110 m	153 metres (502 ft)	2 MW	57.068156°N 8.883790°E	
5	EN-120/3.0	Envision Energy		90 m	120 m	150 metres (490 ft)	3 MW	57.062906°N 8.883833°E	
6	SWT 14-222	Siemens Wind Power	2021	m	222 m		14.0 MW	57.0569979°N 8.8841361°E	
7	SWT 7.0-154	Siemens Wind Power		m	154 m	175 metres (574 ft)	7.0 MW	57.0516083°N 8.8840556°E	
8	SWT 11.0-200	Siemens Wind Power	December 2020	140 m	200 m	240 metres (790 ft)	11.0 MW		

== Gallery ==
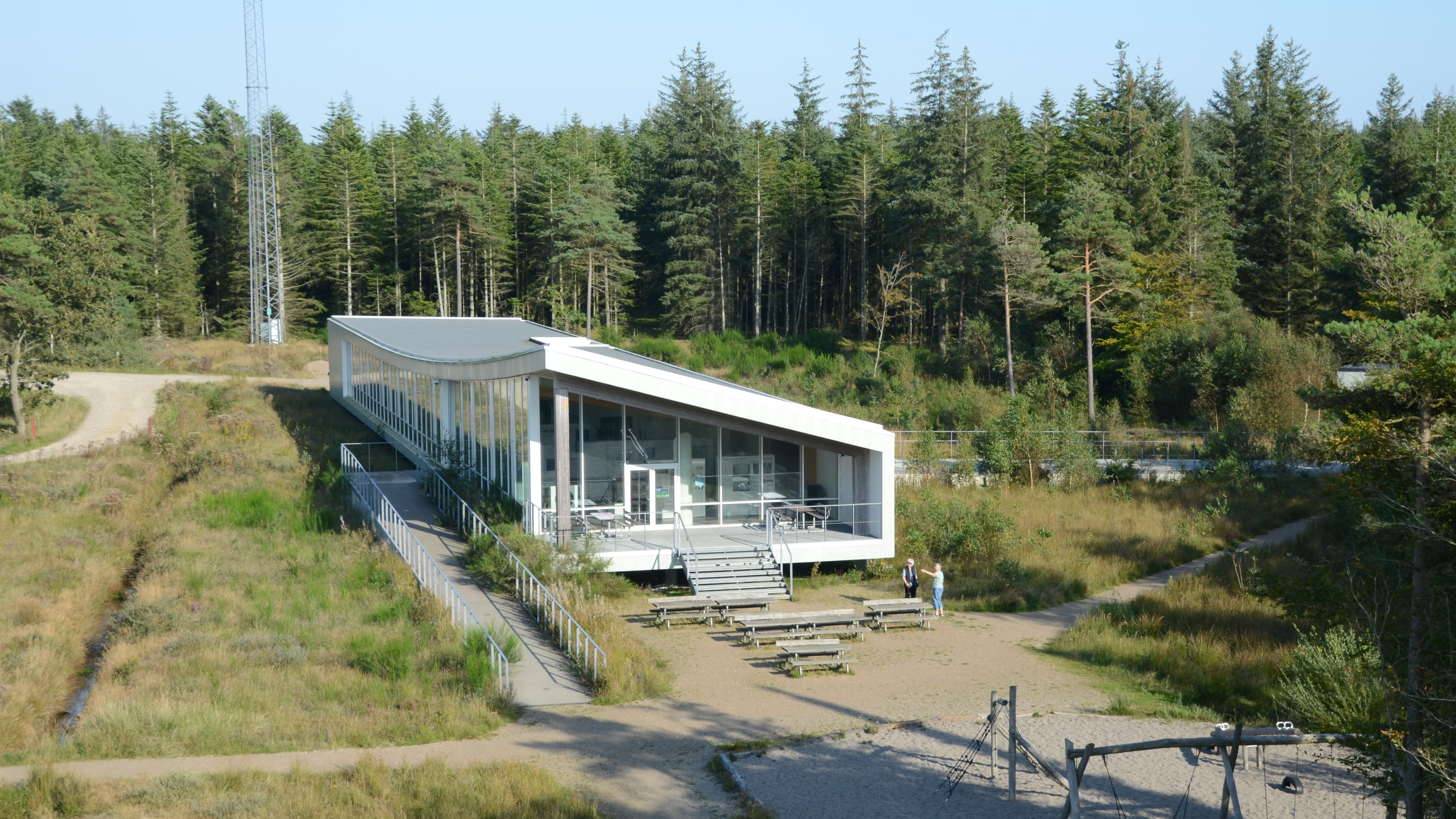
The visitor centre

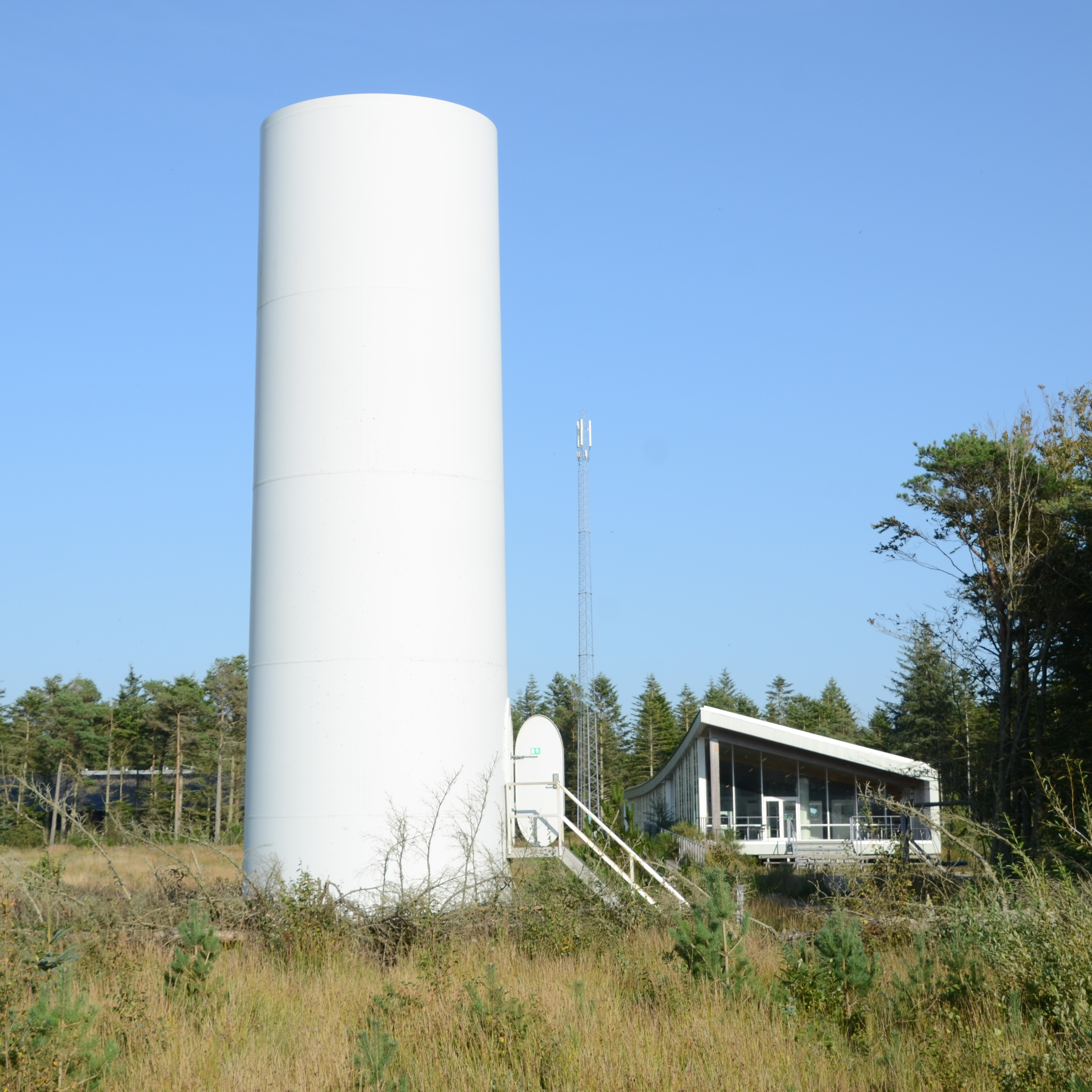
The observation tower

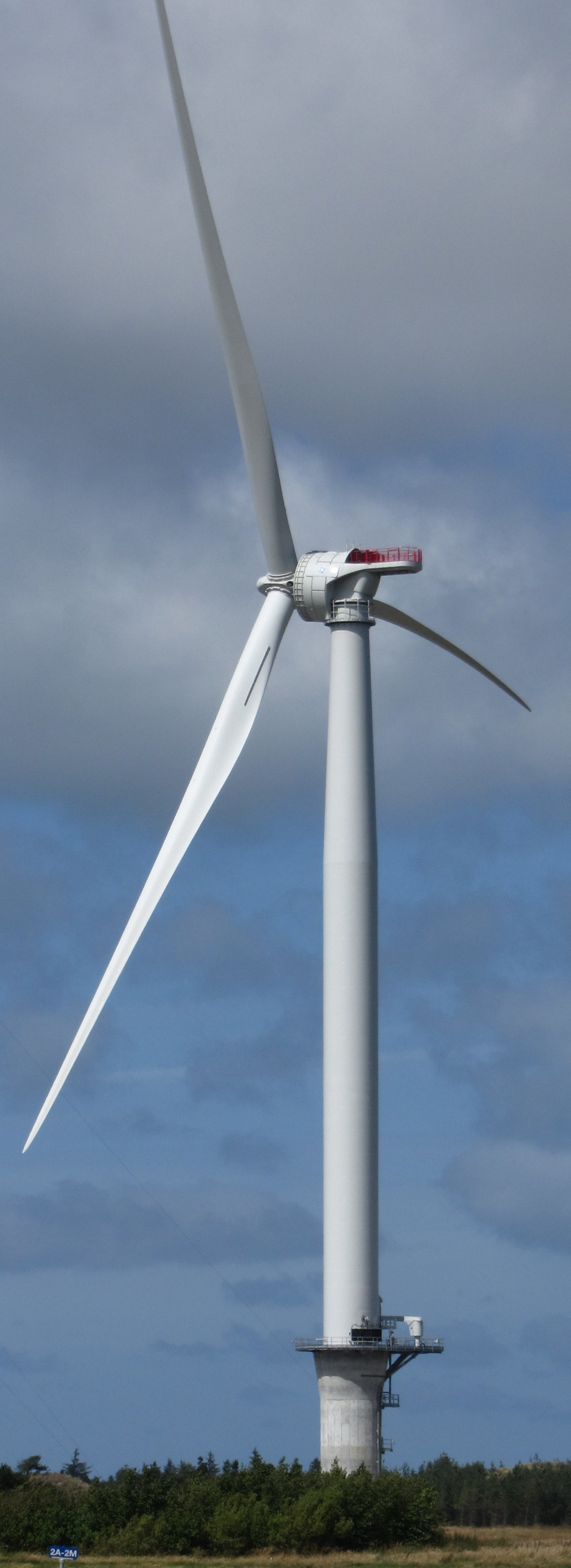
GE Wind (offshore), 6MW

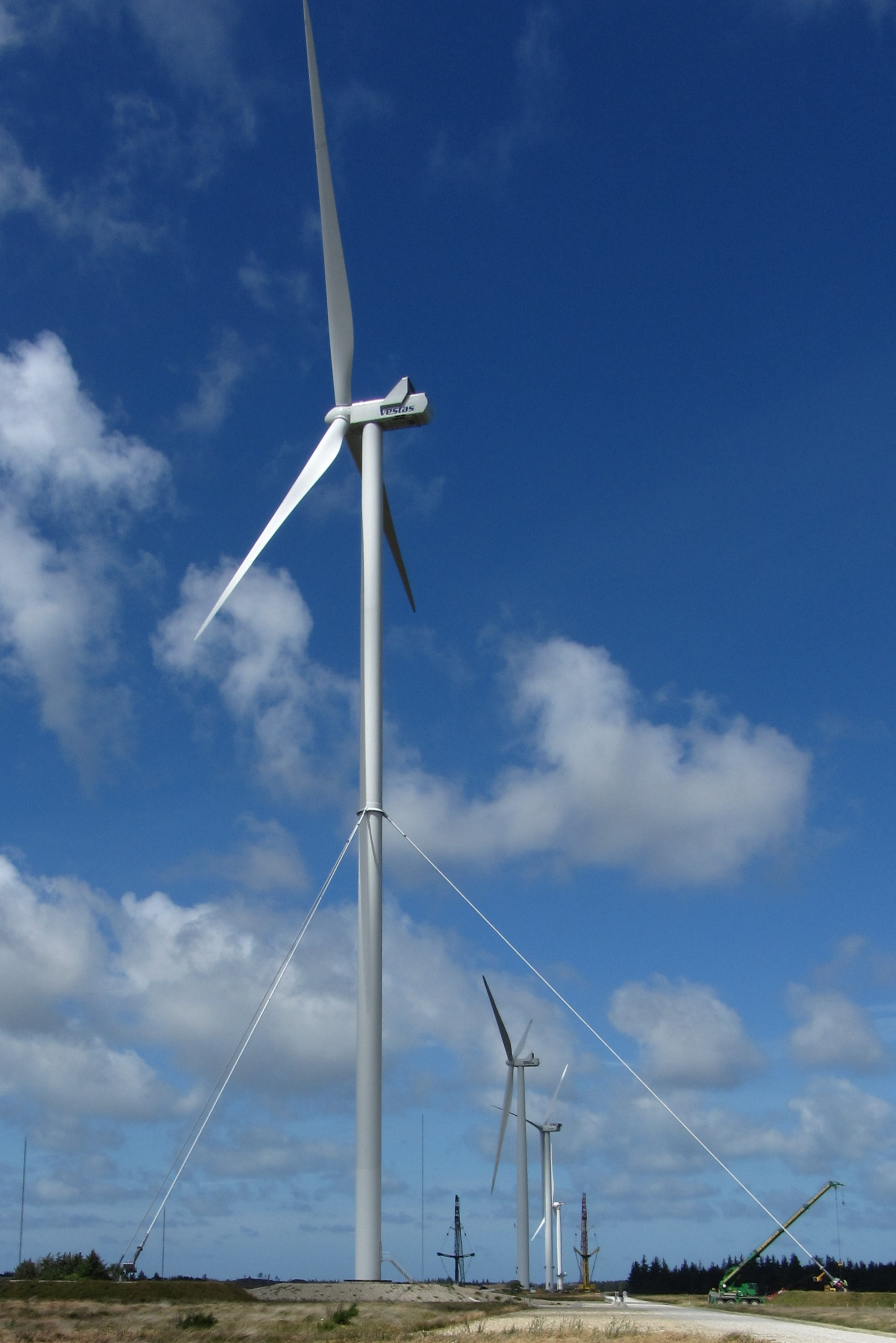
Vestas V126-3.45 MW guyed tower

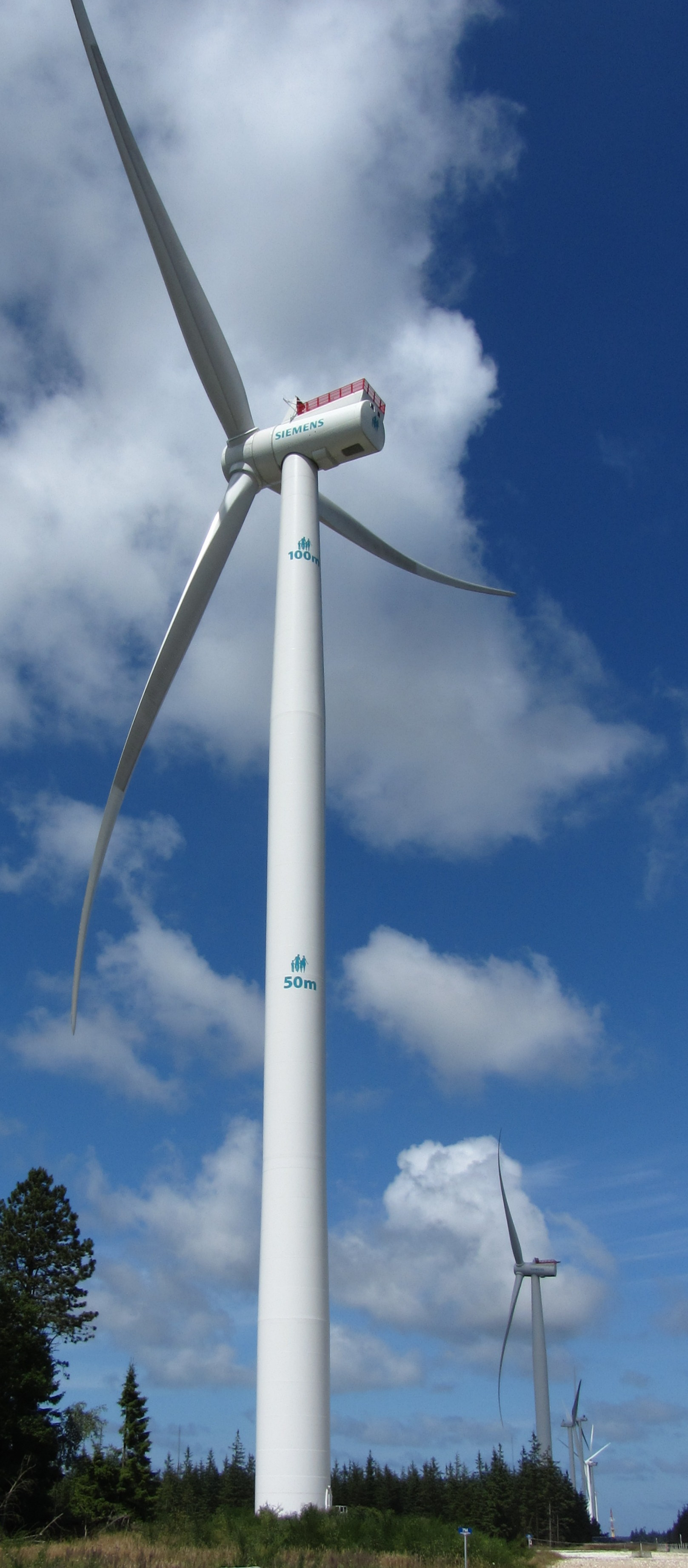
Siemens 7MW

== See also ==
- Wind power in Denmark
- List of tallest structures in Denmark
