= Kitsissut Islands =

Island group in Kujalleq, Greenland

- Location within Greenland
- Interactive map of Kitsissut Islands

Geography
- Location: Labrador Sea; Southern Greenland
- Coordinates: 59°59′N 45°10′W
- Highest elevation: 101 m (331 ft)

Administration
- Greenland
- Municipality: Kujalleq

Demographics
- Population: 0

Kitsissut (old spelling Kitsigsut) is an island group in the Kujalleq municipality in southern Greenland.

== Geography ==
Kitsissut is an island chain located about 60 kilometres (37 miles) to the west-northwest of Cape Farewell and 15 km to the south-southeast of Cape Egede 5 km from the shore. It is a cluster of numerous small islets and rocks, with a length of less than 30 km and a width of 8 km, divided into two subgroups: Northern Kitsissut (Danish: Nordlige Kitsissut) in the northwest and the smaller Southern Kitsissut (Danish: Sydlige Kitsissut) in the southeast.

Angissoq is the largest island, with a length of 3.7 km and a width of 3 km. It is also the highest island with a peak in its centre on which a beacon stands.

== Climate ==
The Kitsissut Islands experience a tundra climate (Köppen: ET); with short, cool summers and long, very cold winters.

Climate data for Kitsissut Islands (Angissoq) (59.35°N 45.13°W) (14 m (46 ft) AMSL) (1991-2020 data)
Month	Jan	Feb	Mar	Apr	May	Jun	Jul	Aug	Sep	Oct	Nov	Dec	Year
Record high °C (°F)	9.6 (49.3)	9.3 (48.7)	9.3 (48.7)	12.0 (53.6)	14.3 (57.7)	14.1 (57.4)	16.1 (61.0)	16.0 (60.8)	15.0 (59.0)	13.8 (56.8)	11.2 (52.2)	9.7 (49.5)	16.1 (61.0)
Mean daily maximum °C (°F)	−1.1 (30.0)	−1.6 (29.1)	−0.9 (30.4)	1.5 (34.7)	3.5 (38.3)	5.4 (41.7)	6.7 (44.1)	7.2 (45.0)	6.2 (43.2)	3.9 (39.0)	1.7 (35.1)	0.1 (32.2)	2.7 (36.9)
Daily mean °C (°F)	−2.8 (27.0)	−3.3 (26.1)	−2.5 (27.5)	−0.1 (31.8)	1.7 (35.1)	3.2 (37.8)	4.5 (40.1)	5.2 (41.4)	4.5 (40.1)	2.4 (36.3)	0.3 (32.5)	−1.4 (29.5)	1.0 (33.8)
Mean daily minimum °C (°F)	−4.4 (24.1)	−5.0 (23.0)	−4.2 (24.4)	−1.8 (28.8)	−0.2 (31.6)	1.0 (33.8)	2.2 (36.0)	3.3 (37.9)	2.9 (37.2)	1.0 (33.8)	−1.1 (30.0)	−2.8 (27.0)	−0.8 (30.6)
Record low °C (°F)	−16.1 (3.0)	−15.9 (3.4)	−16.3 (2.7)	−9.5 (14.9)	−9.4 (15.1)	−5.1 (22.8)	−2.5 (27.5)	−2.8 (27.0)	−1.8 (28.8)	−6.2 (20.8)	−9.1 (15.6)	−13.0 (8.6)	−16.1 (3.0)
Average relative humidity (%)	71.8	71.8	72.1	77.9	82.8	87.9	89.7	90.7	85.7	77.8	75.9	73.8	79.8
Source: Danish Meteorological Institute (1991-2020 temperature & humidity)

== See also ==
- List of islands of Greenland
