= Rø Church =

Church in Bornholm Regional Municipality, Denmark

Coordinates: 55.210581°N 14.896158°E

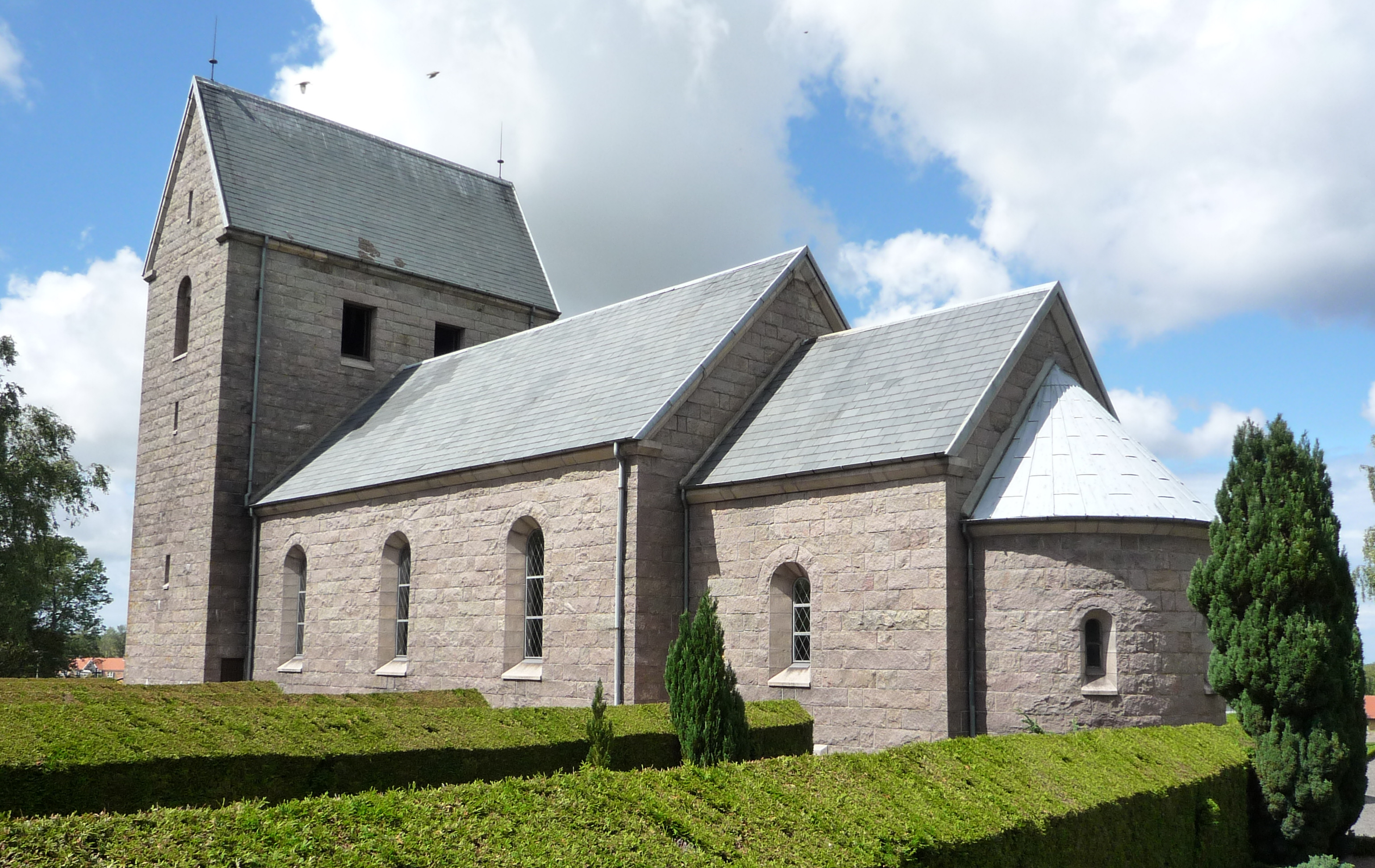
Rø Church exterior

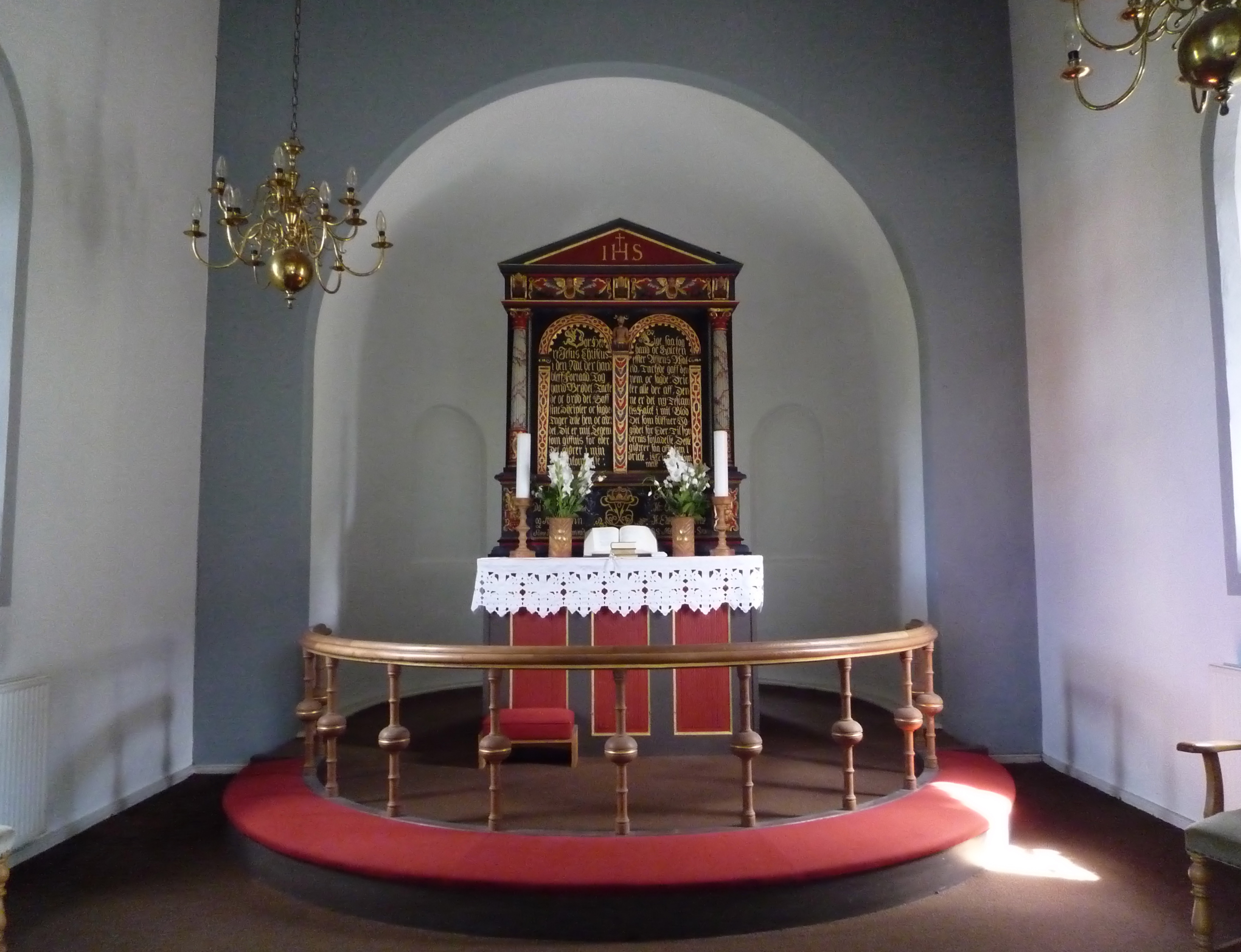
Rø Church altar

Rø Church (Rø Kirke) is a parish church located in the little village of Rø in the north of the Danish island of Bornholm. Completed in 1888, it replaces a Romanesque building dating from c. 1200 which was demolished in 1887 as a result of structural problems.

Rø church was built between 1887 and 1888 on the basis of drawings made in 1884 by architect Mathias Bidstrup (1852–1929). Built in the New Romanesque style, the church is more or less a copy of it copy of its predecessor. It was constructed of cleaved granite from a quarry at Gudmingegård and covered with a slate roof. The altarpiece and pulpit from 1601 were from the older building. The Renaissance style altarpiece dates from 1610. The Frobenius organ was installed in 1955. Rø Church underwent restoration between 1972 and 1973 under the direction of architect Rolf Graae (1916–1996).

== See also ==
- List of churches on Bornholm
