= Cape Egede =

Geographical feature in southwest Greenland

Cape Egede Kap Egede
- Cape
- Coordinates: 60°9′N 45°23′W
- Location: Kujalleq, Greenland
- Offshore water bodies: Labrador Sea

Area
  - Total: Arctic

Cape Egede (Danish: Kap Egede) is a headland in southwest Greenland in the Kujalleq municipality near the modern settlement of Nanortalik. It is named after Danish-Norwegian missionary Hans Egede.

== Geography ==
The cape is located at the southern end of Sermersooq Island (Sermersok) off the western coast of Nanortalik Island roughly between Cape Thordvaldsen and Cape Farewell. The Kitsissut Islands lie offshore to the south of the cape.
