= Angissoq Loran-C transmitter =

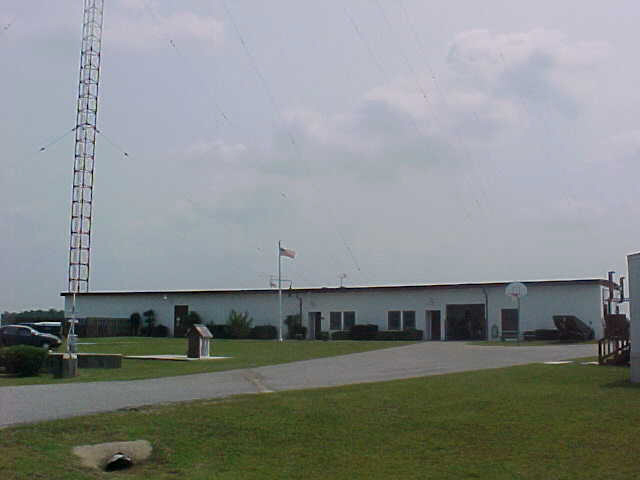

- Location within Greenland
- Coordinates: 59°59′18″N 45°10′24″W
- Built: 1964

Angissoq Loran-C transmitter was a Loran-C transmitter on the Kitsissut Islands, at the far south of Greenland. It was part of the North Atlantic, Labrador Sea and Icelandic Loran-C chains.

== Loran-C ==
Loran-C is a system of hyperbolic radio navigation which developed from the earlier LORAN system. It uses low frequency signals from beacons to allow the receiver to determine their position. Conventional navigation involves measuring the distance from two known locations, radio navigation works in a similar way but using radio direction finding.

Radio navigation systems use a chain of three or four transmitters which are synchronised. Each chain has a primary station and the others are called secondaries. Each chain has a group repetition interval (GRI) which, multiplied by ten, is the time difference between pulses. The GRI identifies which chain a vessel is receiving.

Loran-C was replaced by civilian satellite navigation systems starting in the 1990s. The first services to close were in the United States and Canada in 2010. In 2014 France and Norway announced they were closing their transmitters, leaving the remaining stations in England and Germany unable to operate. The stations in Norway closed on 31 December 2015.

== Angissoq LORAN-C station ==
Angissoq station was a member of several Loran-C chains. The North Atlantic chain (GRI 7930) consisted of Angissoq (master), Cape Race (Canada), Edje (Faroe Islands) and Sandur (Iceland). The Icelandic chain (GRI 9980) was Angissoq, Edje and Sandur, and the Labrador Sea chain (GRI 7930) was Angissoq, Cape Race and Fox Harbour (Canada).

The station opened with a 1,350 feet (410 m) mast but this collapsed in August 1964. It was replaced by a 625 feet (191 m) mast in 1965. It run with a Memorandum of Understanding between the USA and Denmark and most of the staff were Danish.

On 31 December 31, 1994 the transmitter was shut down.
