= Nordjylland Power Station =

Coal-fired combined heat and power plant in Denmark

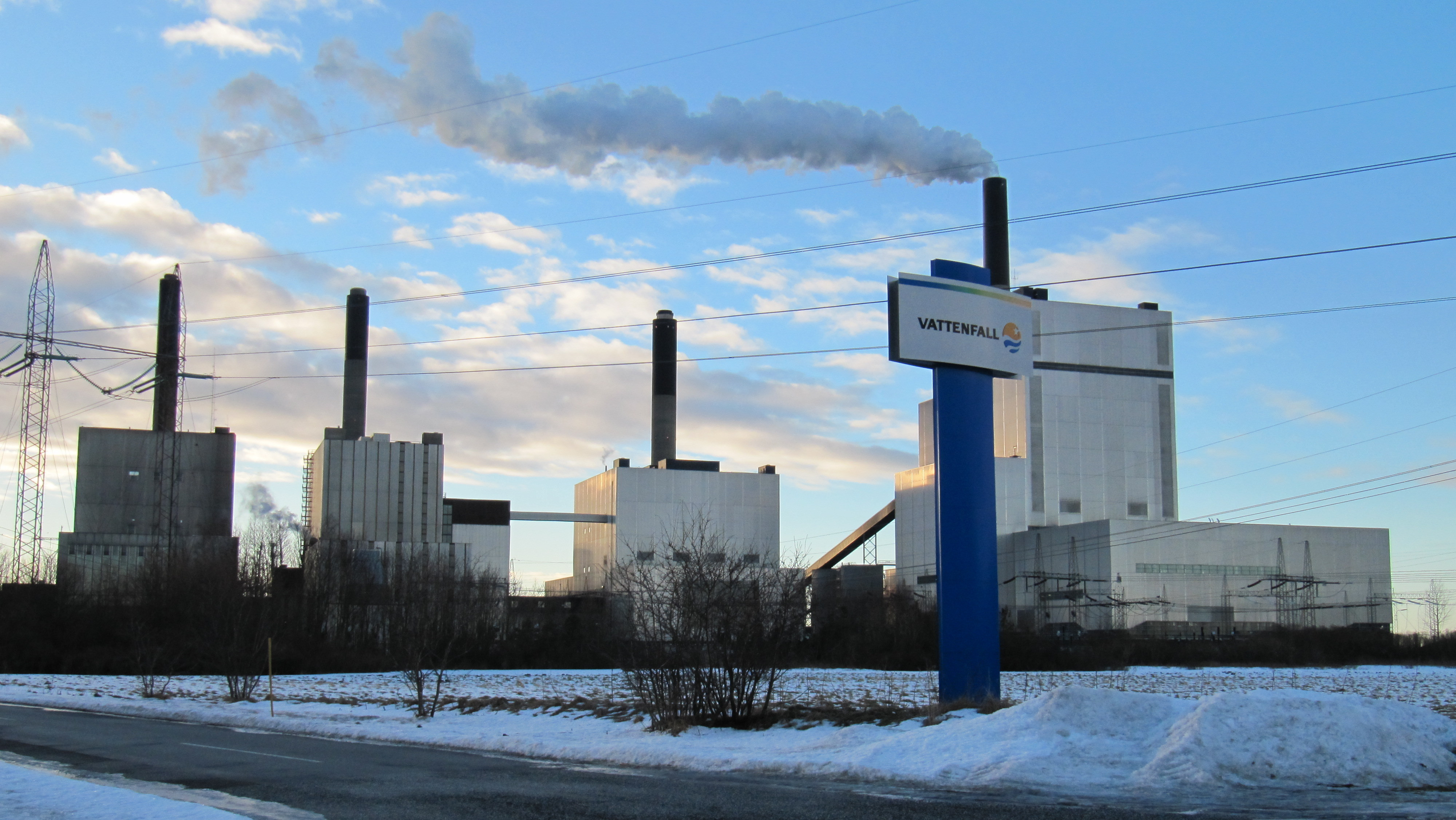
- Nordjylland Power Station with all four units.
- Official name: Nordjyllandsværket
- Country: Denmark
- Location: Vodskov
- Coordinates: 57°04′29.9″N 10°02′21.8″E
- Status: Operational
- Commission date: 1967
- Owner: Aalborg Kommune
- Operator: Aalborg Forsyning

Thermal power station
- Primary fuel: Coal
- Turbine technology: Steam turbine
- Cooling source: Salt sea water from the fjord
- Cogeneration?: Yes
- Thermal capacity: 422 MW

Power generation
- Units operational: 1 × 25 MW; Unit 3: 385 MW
- Units decommissioned: 2
- Nameplate capacity: 385 MW
- Annual net output: Unit 3: 719 GWh electric and 3345 TJ district heating (2023)

External links
- Commons: Related media on Commons

Nordjylland Power Station (Danish: Nordjyllandsværket) is a coal-fired combined heat and power plant in Vodskov, 17 kilometres (11 mi) north-east of Aalborg, Denmark. It is operated by the municipality Aalborg Kommune.

== History ==
The first unit at the site became operational in 1967, under the association "I/S Nordjyllands Elektricitetsforsyning". Its original name from the opening was "Vendsysselværket", and build to burn oil from the start, but prepared for reconstruction to also burn coal.

The power plant has 3 coal fired boilers and a gas turbine. The gas turbine has an output of 25 MW and entered service in 1977, while unit 2, which went also in 1977 has a maximum production capacity of electricity of 305 MW and heat of 42 MJ/s. Unit 3, which entered service in 1998, has a maximum production capacity of 411 MW and a maximum heat production capacity of 490 MJ/s. It uses a 170.1 metres (558 ft) tall flue gas stack, while Units 1 and 2 and the gas turbine use 112.17 metres (368.0 ft) tall stacks. Unit 3 was the first power plant in Denmark with a SNOX-system for exhaust cleaning.

The produced heat is used for district heating of Aalborg.

An electric boiler for district heating was inaugurated in January 2018. It can convert 35 MW from electricity to heated water, and can act as a back-up heating source for the district heating system. This electric boiler was envisioned in 2017 to replace some of the use of methane gas and oil for the district heatings backup needs, and sell regulations services for the electricity market.

Plant owner Aalborg Forsyning has said the power plant will stop using coal in 2028.

== Units ==
Units
	Commission	Fuel	Electric capacity [MW]	Heat capacity [MW]	Decommission
Unit 1	9 January 1967	Fuel oil	140		1996
Unit 1	1982	Coal	140		1996
Unit 2	31 March 1977	Fuel oil	300	42	2014
Unit 2	22 April 1987	Coal	300	42	2014
Unit 3	14 September 1998	Coal	385	422	Active; Planned 2028

== Power lines ==
While two power lines leave the station eastward to the famous Vester Hassing Static Inverter Plant, where HVDC Konti-Skan starts, two other 380 kV lines cross Limfjord just east of the power plant in two spans. The towers of the westernmost of these spans are 101.2 metres (332 ft) tall and cross Limfjord in a 723 metres (2,372 ft) long span, while that of the easternmost span are 141.7 metres (465 ft) tall and cross Limfjord in a 797 metres (2,615 ft) long span. Latter towers are the tallest electricity pylons in Denmark. Their considerable height results from the fact that they are equipped with a further crossbar for a 110 kV circuit.

== See also ==
- List of power stations in Denmark
