= Georg Emil Libert =

Danish landscape painter

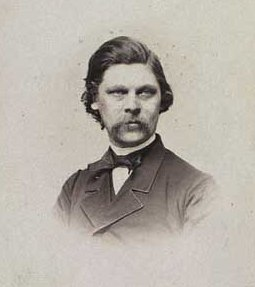
Georg Emil Libert (late 1860s)

Georg Emil Libert (2 August 1820 – 19 May 1908) was a Danish landscape painter. His specialties included scenes featuring Danish, German, and Norwegian landscapes.

== Biography ==
Libert was born in Copenhagen, Denmark. He was the son of Johan Christian Libert (1790–1846) and his first wife, Andrea Margrethe Hassing (1796–1820). His father was a cabinetmaker.

He was a graduate of the Royal Academy in Copenhagen where he studied under Johan Ludwig Lund (1777–1867). In 1845, he applied for travel support from the Academy, which was awarded to him in 1846 with renewed scholarship in 1847. He stayed abroad from 1857 to 1859, especially in Germany and Switzerland. He sought inspiration, especially from the Munich landscape scene.

He exhibited many works in Charlottenborg and at the Kunstforeningen ('Art Association'). He is best known for his paintings of the Baltic island of Bornholm. One of the cliffs at Helligdomsklipperne, Libert's Rock (Libertsklippen) is named in his honor.

Many of his works today are in the Danish National Gallery and Thorvaldsens Museum, and are highly sought after by buyers; his painting Ansicht des Heidelberger Schlosses Zwischen der Molkenkur, der Stadt (1859) sold for $11,240 ($24,416 in 2025) at Sotheby's in Munich in June 1994.

== Personal life ==
In 1852, he married Marie Philippine Caroline Busch (1830–1904). Georg Libert died during 1908 in Copenhagen and was buried at the Cemetery of Holmen.

== Gallery ==
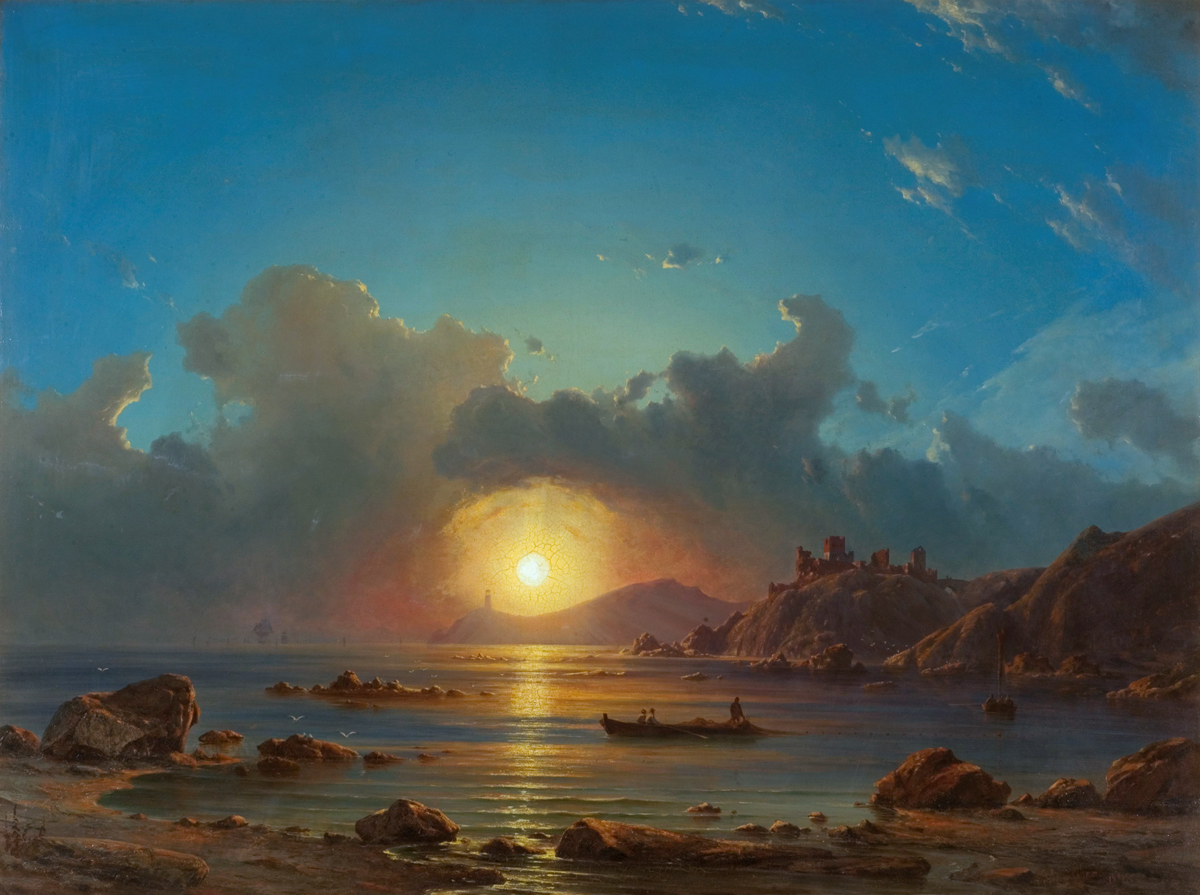
Sunset on a Bay with Castle Ruins
(1848)

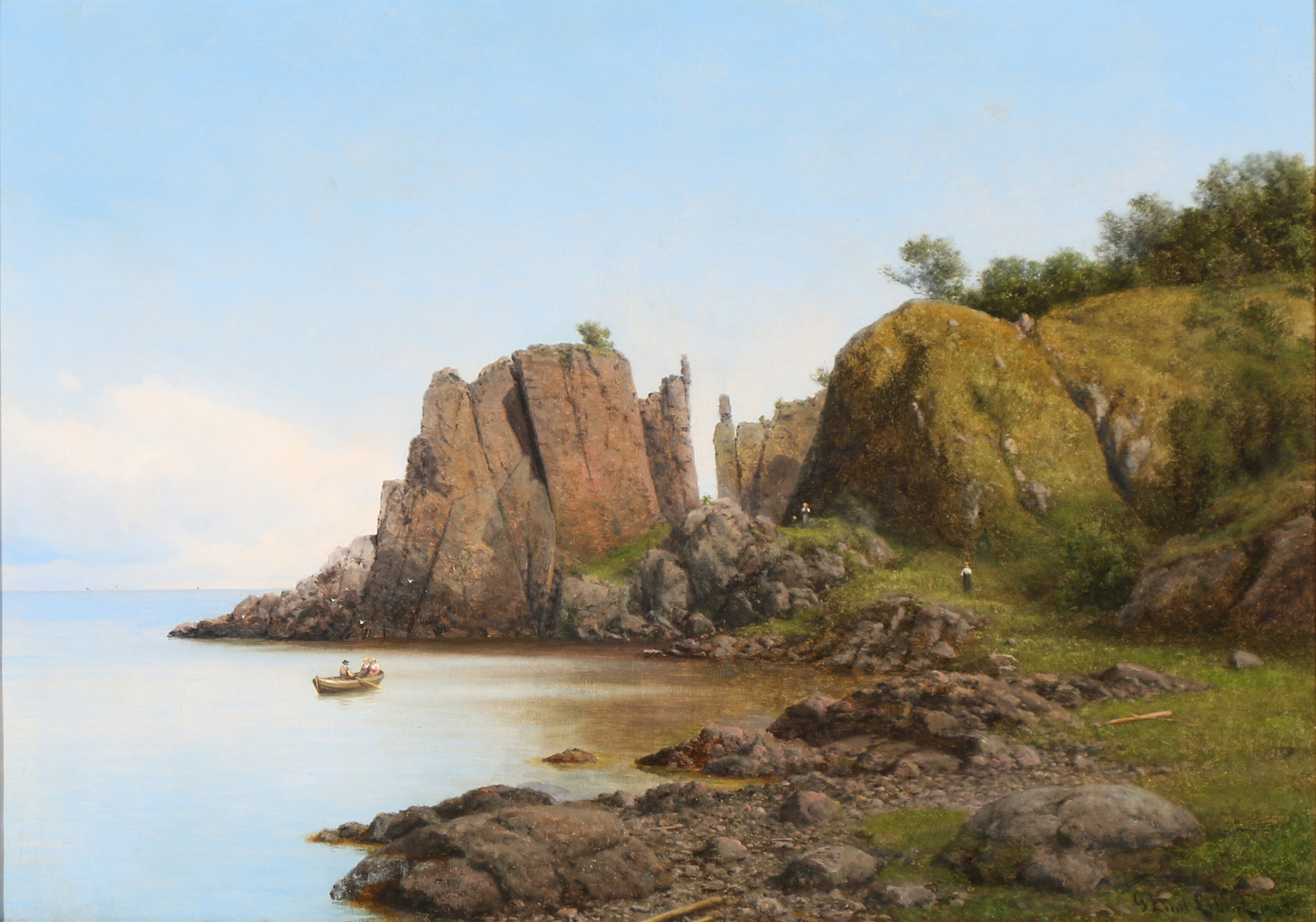
View of Helligdomsklipperne, Bornholm
(1903)

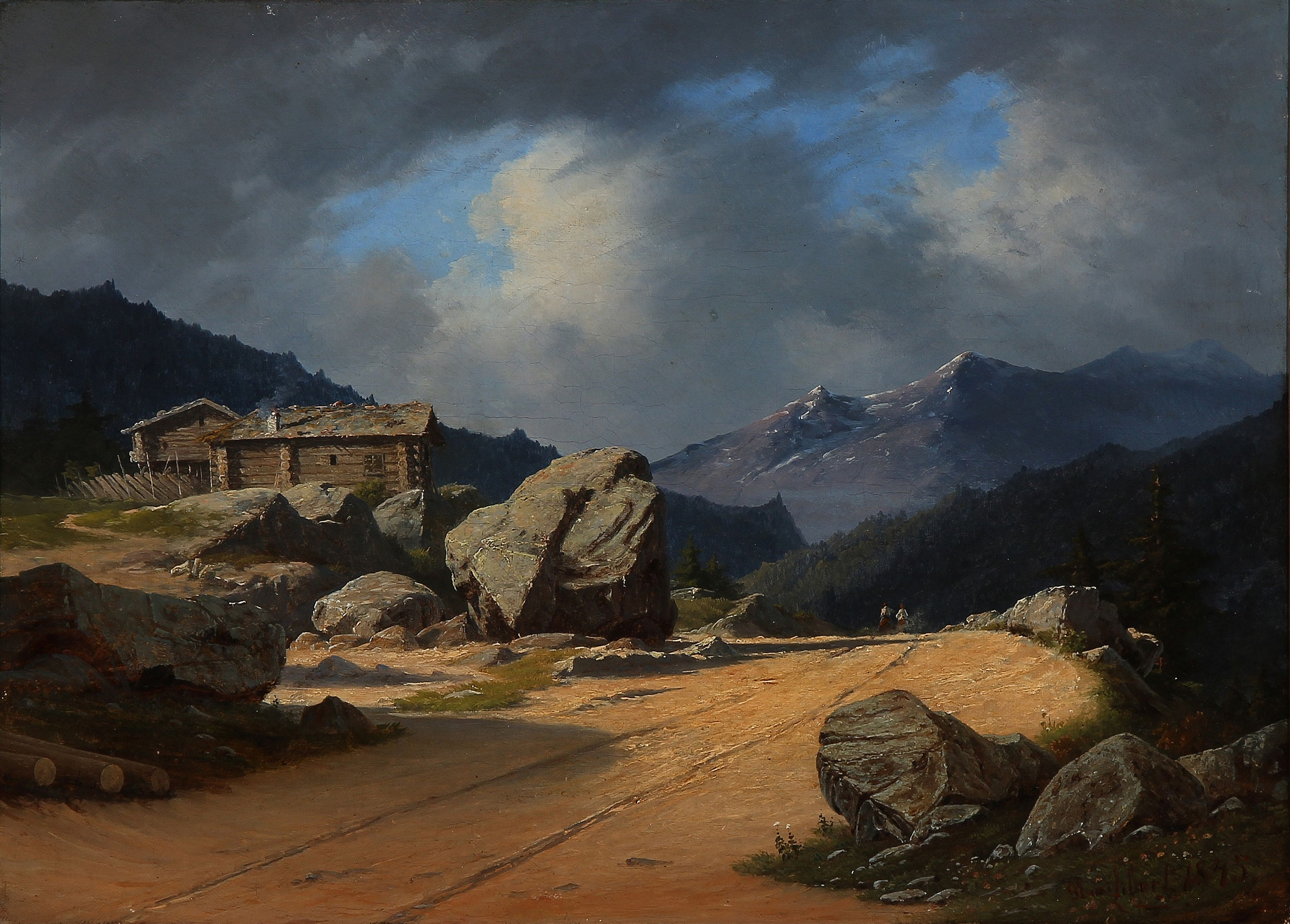
Norwegian landscape with two men on horseback (1845)

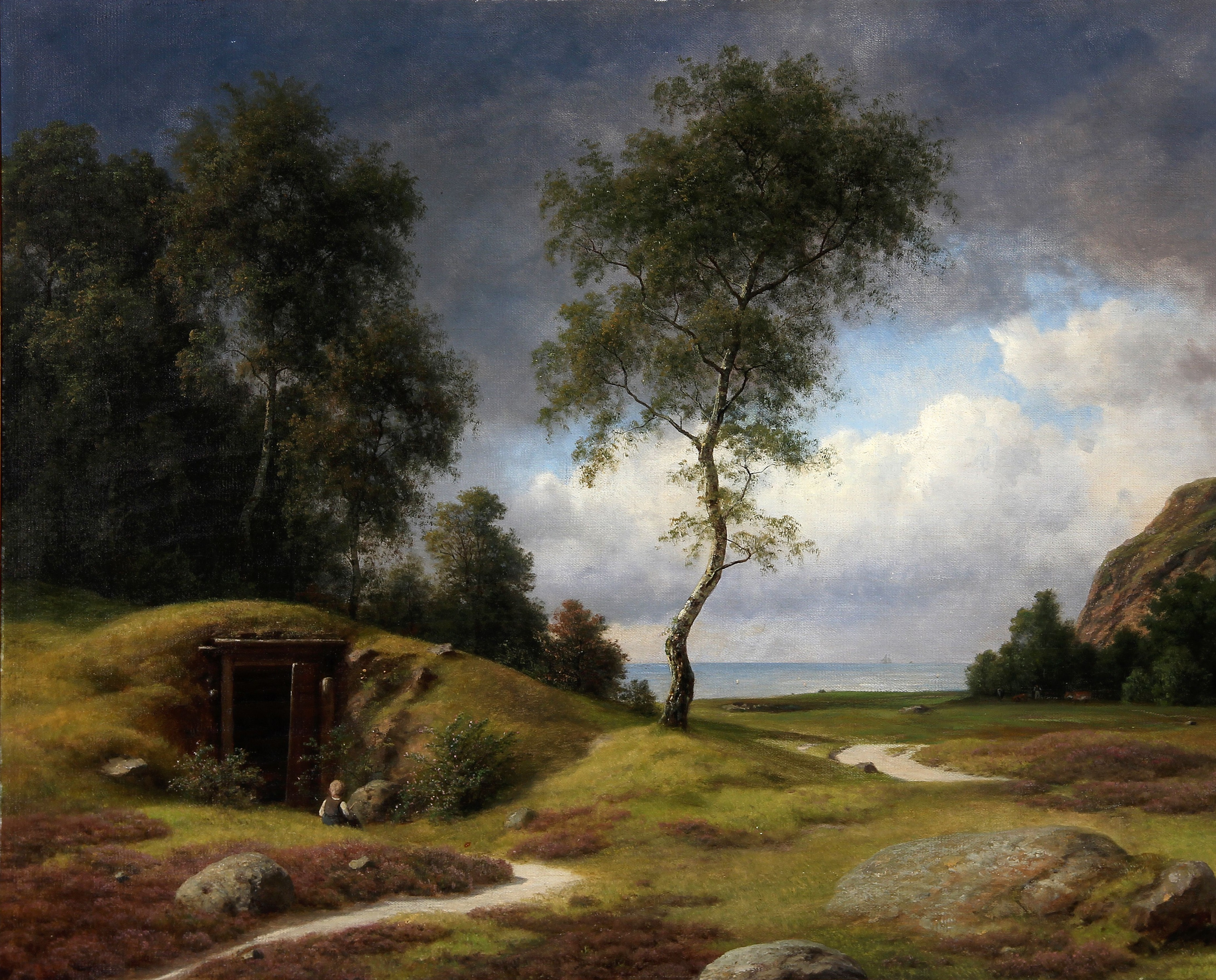
Landscape with a boy sitting in front of a burial mound (1885)
