= Helligdomsklipperne =

Group of rocks on the island of Bornholm, Denmark

Coordinates: 55°13′32″N 14°53′40″E

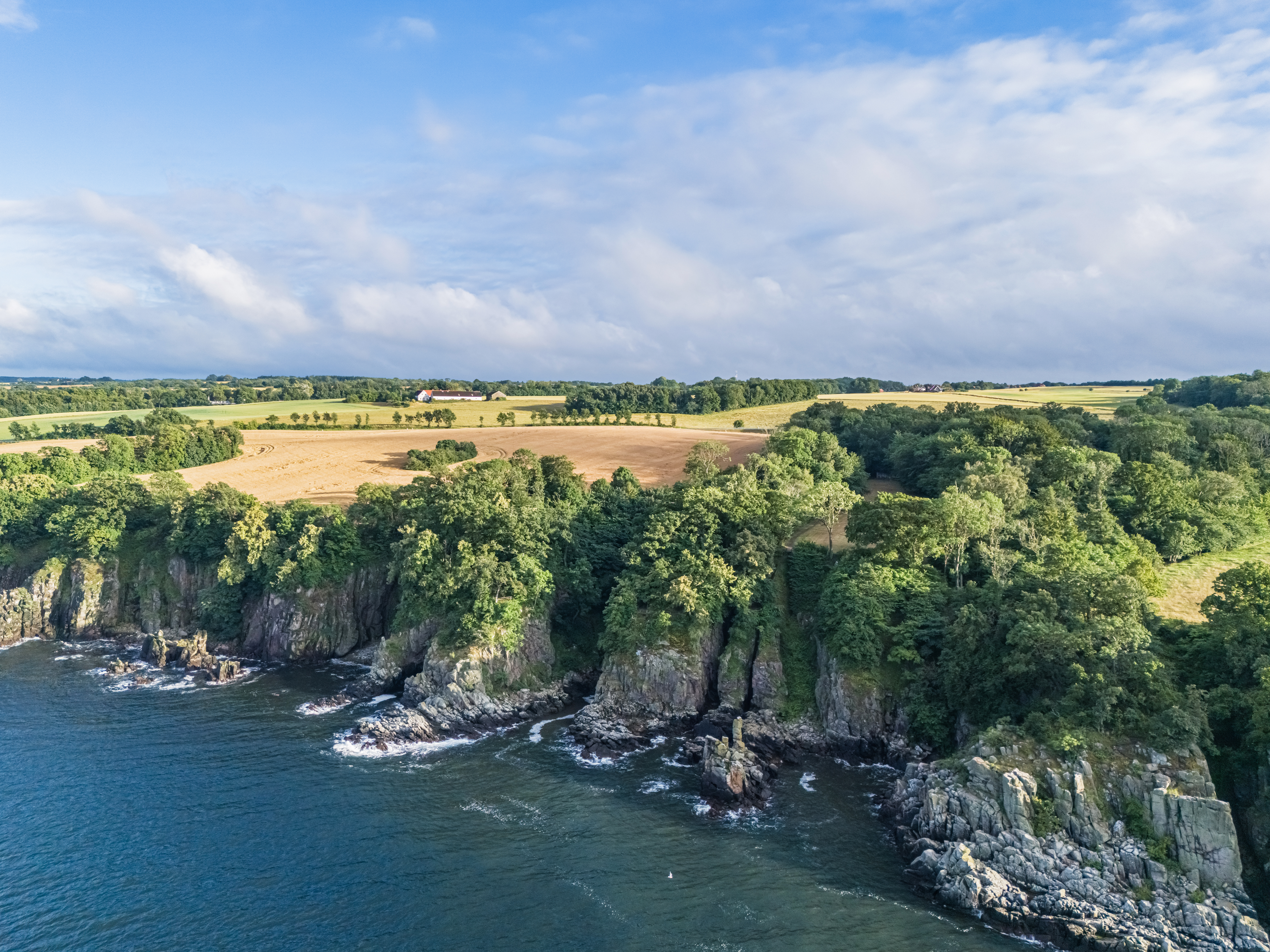
Helligdomsklipperne, aerial view

Helligdomsklipperne (Sanctuary Rocks) are a group of rocks on the island of Bornholm, Denmark, 6 kilometres (3.7 mi) from Gudhjem and 4.9 kilometres (3.0 mi) from Tejn. They are characterised by moderately high coastal cliffs of sharp granite and are about 22 metres (72 ft) high. The name of the rocks originated in the Middle Ages when there was a holy spring close to the coast which attracted pilgrims, especially on Sankt Hans Aften. During the ice age, much of today's coast was below sea level but when the ice melted, the island itself was raised leaving this part of Bornholm's coast some 20 meters above sea level. Coastal cliffs with deep caves and steep craggy granite pillars are typical of this area of the coast as a result of many years exposure to the weather. To the southeast the Kyststi or coastal path leads to the well preserved Døndalen Woods. It is a popular tourist attraction, accessed by boats from Gudhjem harbour. Steps lead from the coast up to the Bornholm Art Museum.

== History ==
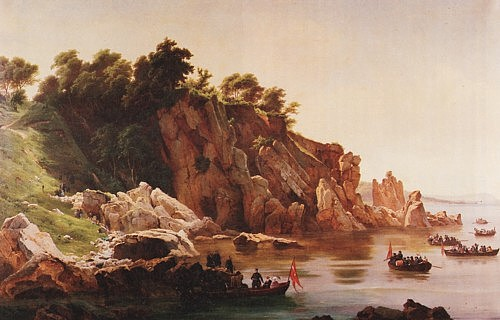
Anders Christian Lunde: Frederik VII's arrival at Helligdomsklipperne

The "holy" character of the area originated in the Middle Ages when a chapel named Trefoldighedskapellet (the Trinity Chapel) stood on the field directly above the rocks. At the foot of the cliffs, there was a spring of holy water which was brought up to the chapel for all those hoping to be cured of their illnesses, especially on Midsummer's Night. An account from 1806, however, describes that there was so little water in the spring that a woman was paid each Midsummer to fill it up with water from the sea.

In 1906, when tourism was developing on Bornholm, the Hotel Helligdommen together with its stretch of land along the coast was bought by a German. The resentment of the local population quickly led to the founding of Foreningen Bornholm (The Bornholm Association) which ensured public access to a coastal path alongside the cliffs. In 1911, the association created the nearby Bornholmerpladsen to accommodate the increasing number of visitors.

== Geology and rock formations ==
The origins of the rocks go back 1,700 million years. Formed of striped gneiss, they are crisscrossed by an abundance of little diabase channels. These created cracks which were later filled in with additional quantities of magma and diabase. Some parts of the bedrock proved more resistant than others, creating the craggy effects which can be seen today. Since the last ice age, the sea has on several occasions risen well above today's sealevel with the result that the rocks were completely submerged some 10,000 years ago. The channels or "ovens" in the cliffs of varying depths are therefore a result of water erosion.

The Sorte Gryde (Black Pot), Våde Ovn (Wet Oven) and Tørre Ovn (Dry Oven) reach far into the rock. At the northwestern end of the formation stands Libertsklippen (Libert's Rock), named after the landscape painter Georg Emil Libert (1820–1908) who showed particular interest in it. The name of Lyseklippen (Candle Rock), first called Lysene (Candles) or Alterlysene (Altar Candles), goes back to the time when there were two "candles" but one was washed away in a storm at the beginning of the 19th century. The other names of the rocks such as Kærlighedsbænken (Lovers' Bench), Mågetårnet (Gull's Tower) and Måneskinsklipperne (Moonshine Rocks) seem to date from the end of the 18th century when tourists invaded the site. The Black Pot is a particularly popular destination for visitors as it is possible to penetrate about 60 metres into the rock.

== Flora ==
Several varieties of rowan trees cling to the cliffs. The common sorbus aucuparia lives side-by-side with the sorbus rupicola or rock whitebeam. This has led to the development of the Finnish whitebeam (sorbus hybrida) and sorbus intermedia or Swedish whitebeam. On the clifftops, plant life includes heather, large pinks as well as oak, birch and juniper. The small-leaved lime is now beginning to replace the diseased elms in the area. The Norway maple can also be found there.
