= Rø =

- Village
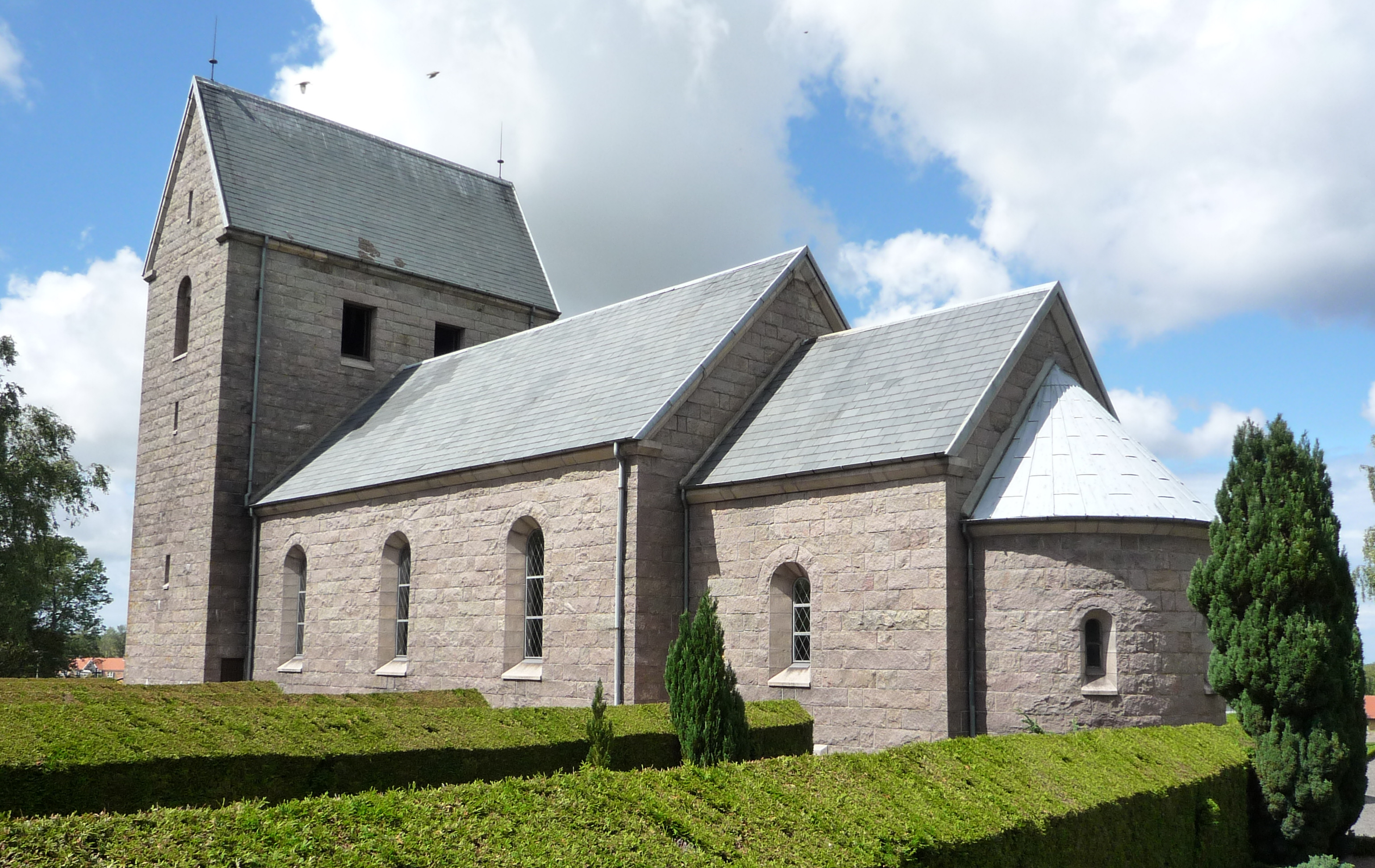
- Rø Church

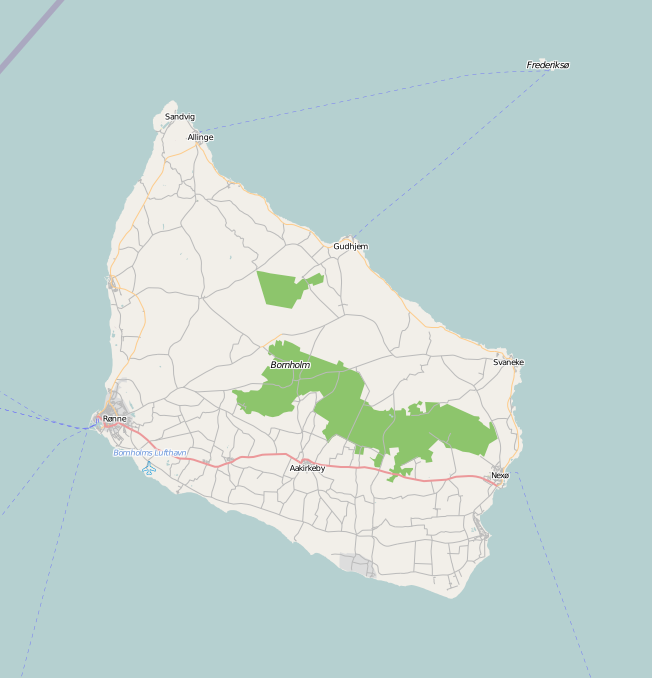
- Location on Bornholm
- Coordinates: 55°12′38″N 14°53′46″E
- Country: Denmark
- Region: Capital Region of Denmark
- Municipality: Bornholm

Population (2012)
  - Total: 181
- Time zone: UTC+1 (CET)
  - Summer (DST): UTC+2 (CEST)

Rø is a small village on the Danish island of Bornholm, 2 km from the north coast and 7 km west of Gudhjem. The Rønne–Allinge railway (1913–1953) brought prosperity to the village leaving the old station in the village. The Bornholm Art Museum is close to Rø as are the scenic Sanctuary Rocks.

Rø Church from 1888 is a rough copy of the now demolished Romanesque building from the 13th century.

With a top at 431.3 metres (1,036 ft) above sea level, the nearby Rø Transmission Tower reaches the highest elevation in Denmark.

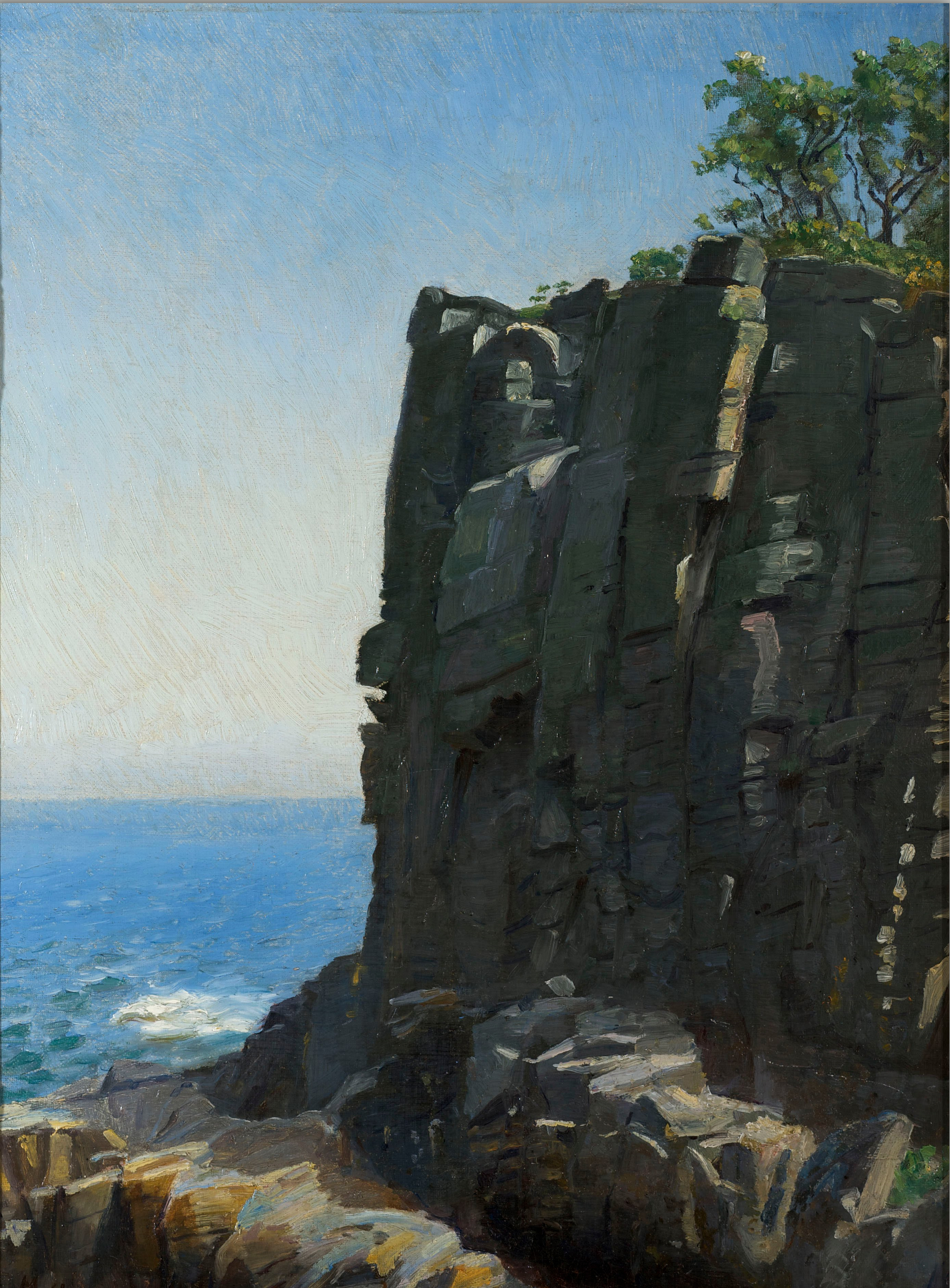
Michael Ancher (born in Bornholm island) The Sanctuary Cliffs at Rø
