= Gryet =

Coordinates: 55°04′17″N 15°04′06″E

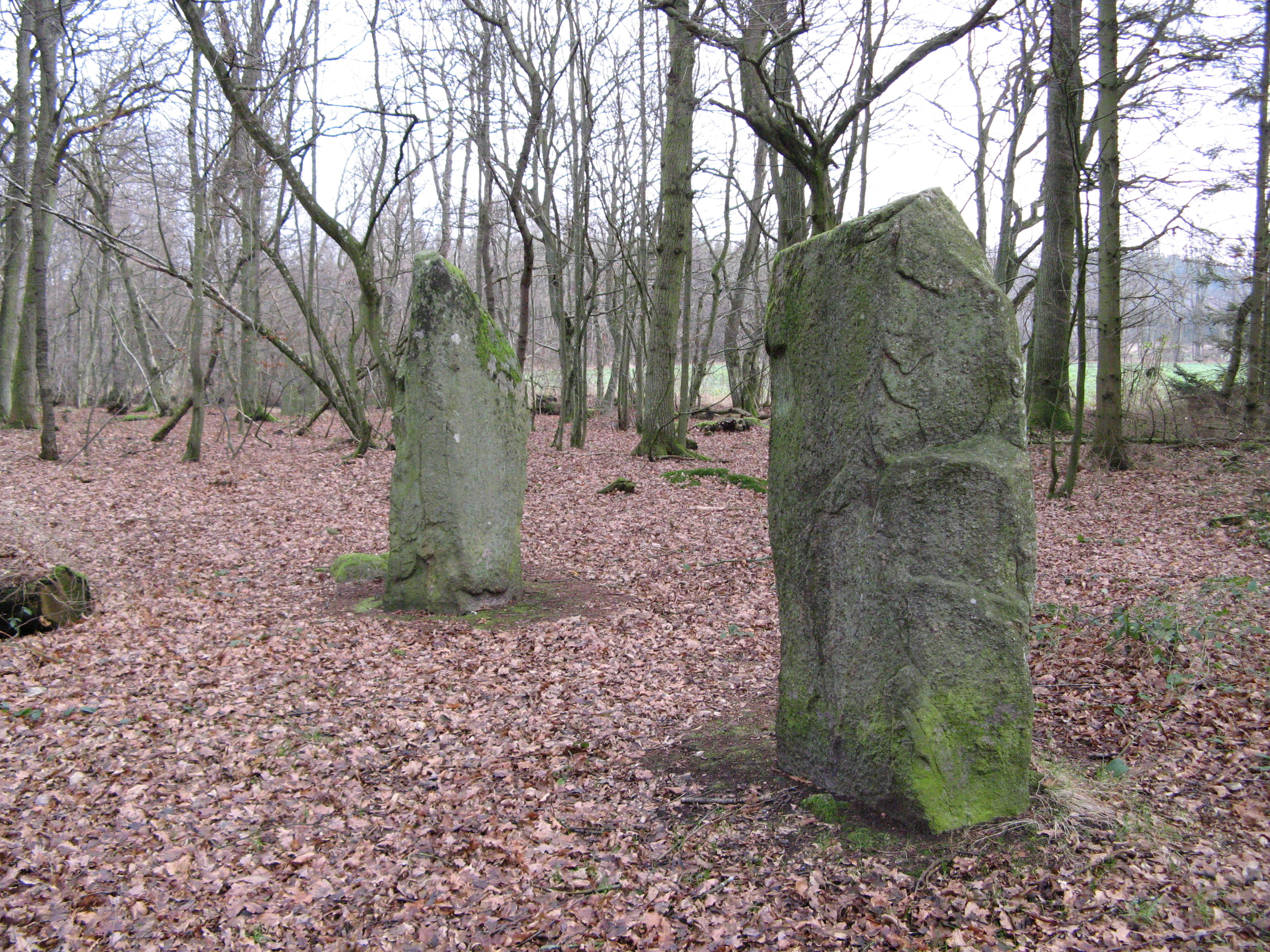
Some of the remaining and erect prehistoric megaliths at Gryet on Bornholm.

Gryet, some 4 kilometres (2.5 mi) west of Nexø and just north of Bodilsker on the Danish island of Bornholm, is a site with one of Denmark's largest collections of megaliths with tall upright stones standing among the trees in a little wood.

== The site ==
Gryet is on high ground which was once surrounded by water or marshes. In the Iron Age, those living in the area found it to be an ideal site for their graves.

There were once over 60 stones but several have been removed and many have now fallen to the ground. The highest, once standing on the mound at the southern side of the wood, was removed in the 17th century to be used as a gravestone. The megaliths, which bear no inscription, stand over graves where the remains of burnt bones are buried. In the early Bronze Age and late Iron Age (1100 BC), it appears to have been common practice to set megaliths over graves of this kind. The stones stand alone or in small groups. As the site has not been archeologically investigated, it is not known why the stones were raised there.

Another important megalithic site on Bornholm is Louisenlund near Østermarie.

== Preservation ==
It was thanks to Emil Vedel, governor of Bornholm from 1866, that the site has been preserved. In 1870, he noticed that some of the stones were being broken up and removed. By 1875 he had managed to have the site listed, saving it from further damage.
