= Louisenlund (Bornholm) =

Coordinates: 55°08′12″N 15°04′05″E

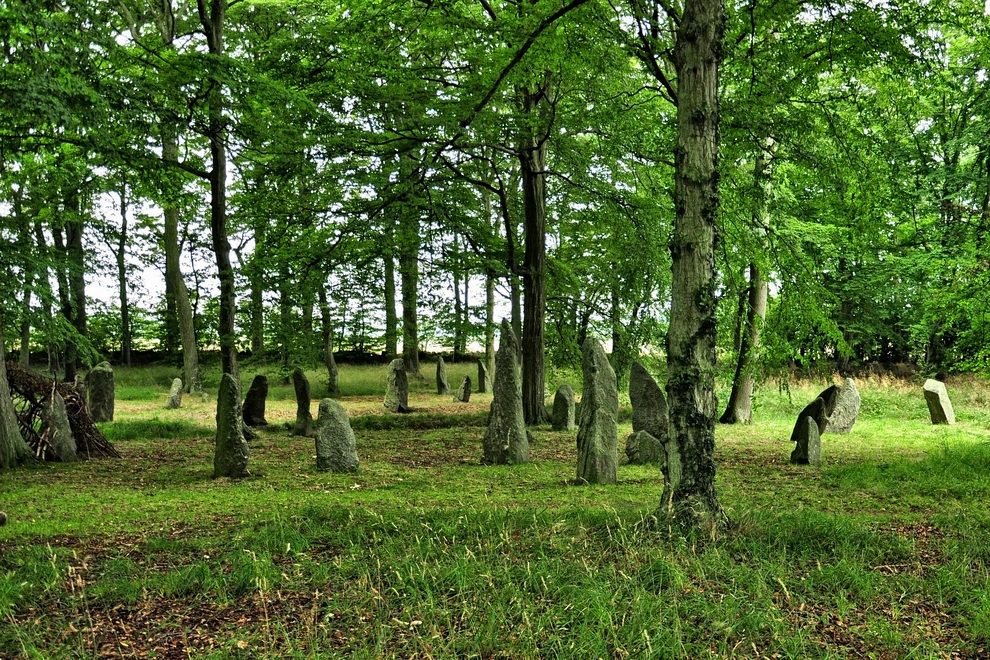
Louisenlund megalithic site, Bornholm

Louisenlund, some 3.5 kilometres (2.2 mi) east of Østermarie on the Danish island of Bornholm, is a site with one of Denmark's largest collection of megaliths. Some 50 stones standing upright among the trees, many of them over 2.5 metres (8 ft 2 in) high. Gryet, a similar site in a wood near Bodilsker west of Nexø once had over 60 megaliths but many have now been removed.

== The site ==
The megaliths, which bear no inscription, stand on low mounds or over graves where the remains of burnt bones are buried. In the early Bronze Age and late Iron Age (1100 BC), it appears to have been common practice to set megaliths over graves of this kind. The stones stand alone or in small groups. As the site has not been archeologically investigated, it is not known why the stones were raised there.

Another important megalithic site on Bornholm is Gryet, a small wooded area 5 kilometres (3.1 mi) west of Nexø. Originally it had more than 60 megaliths. Some have now been removed while half those remaining have fallen to the ground. The highest of them, once standing on the mound towards the south of the wood, was removed in the 17th century to be used as a gravestone.

== Recent history ==
Louisenlund was bought by King Frederik VII when he visited Bornholm in 1851. He named it after his mistress, Countess Louise Danner.
