= Østermarie =

- Village
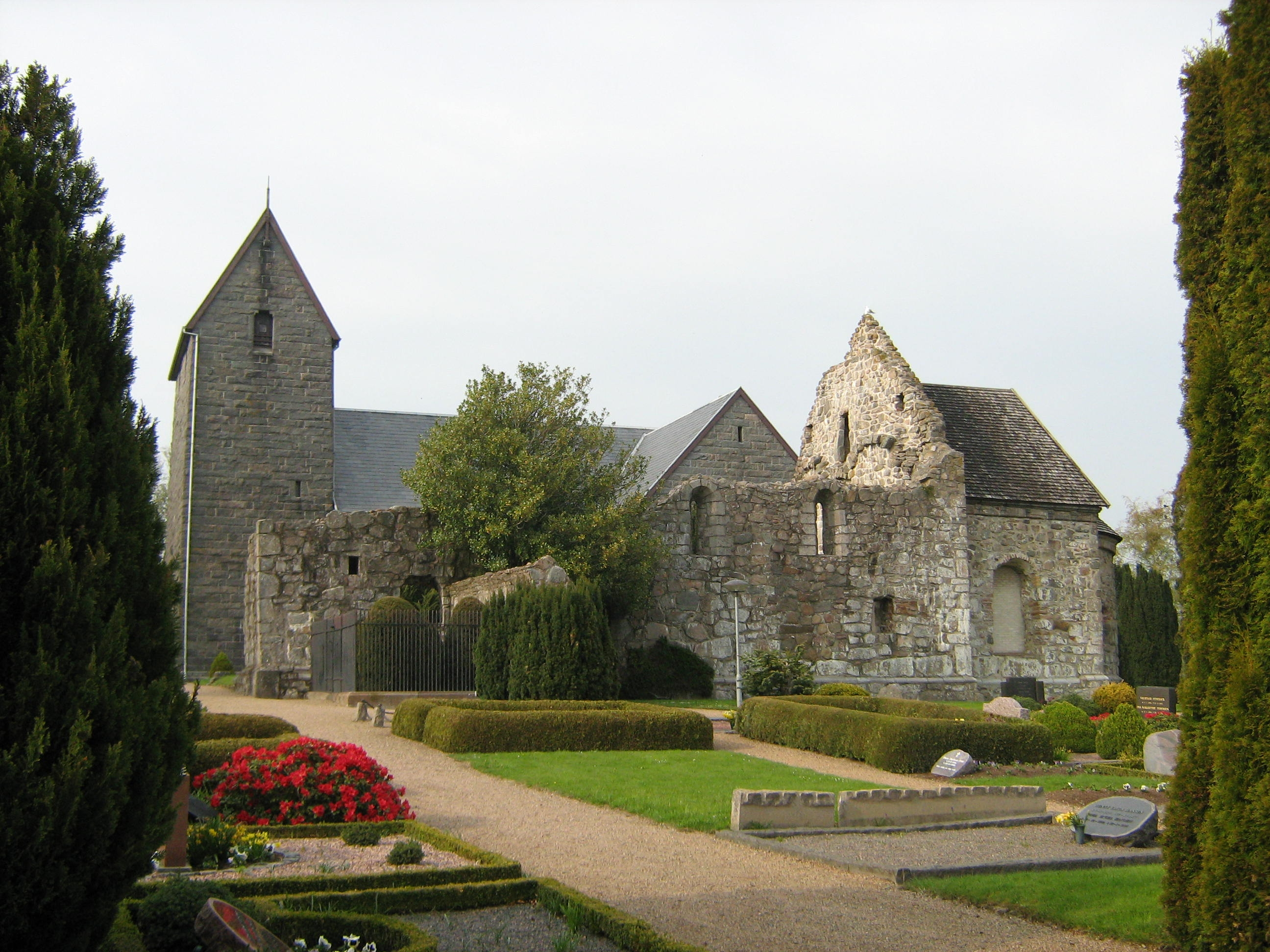
- The old and new churches of Østermarie

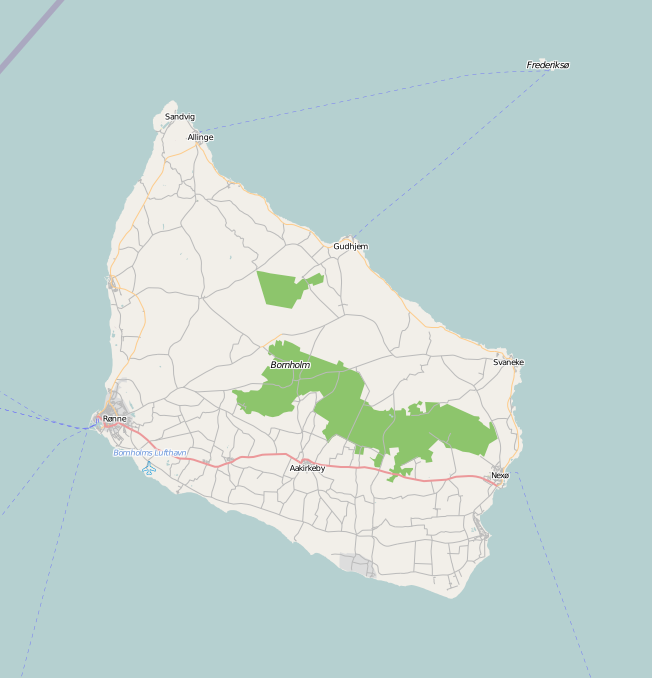
- Location on Bornholm
- Coordinates: 55°8′N 15°0′E
- Country: Denmark
- Region: Capital (Hovedstaden)
- Municipality: Bornholm

Population (2026)
  - Total: 448
- Time zone: UTC+1 (CET)
  - Summer (DST): UTC+2 (CEST)

Østermarie is a village on the Danish island of Bornholm, 8 km (5.0 mi) west of Svaneke. Founded ca. 1880, its old church (Østermarie Church), now a ruin, dates back to the 12th century. The population as of 1 January 2026 is 448.

== History ==
Although St Mary's Church (Sct. Maria Kirke) was built in the second half of the 12th century, today's village has its origins around 1880 when the first dwellings were built. As the village became more prosperous, a new church was built in 1891. A house named Godthåb (1883) served as the local post office. Godthåb, used on the post-office stamp, was the first official name of the locality. When the railway station was opened in 1916, the name was changed to Østermarie. The original name of the parish was Markersen, short for Mary's Church Parish, but it later became Østermarie (Eastern Mary) to distinguish it from Vestermarie (Western Mary) which is also on the island. Buses now replace the railway service which was discontinued in 1952.

== Østermarie today ==
In area, Østermarie is the largest parish on Bornholm. While the population in rural villages has generally declined, the number of inhabitants in Østermarie has been fairly stable in recent years, thanks in part to its lively retail trade. Each year, the KulturBornholm association, based in Østermarie, selects an Artist of Honour who has a street named after him. Recent winners have given their names to Aage Haugland's Gyde (Lane) in honour of the Wagner bass, "Benny Andersens Boldgade" songwriter, and "Seamus Heaney Stræde" celebrating the Irish Nobel Prize-winning poet. In 2010, the Danish harpsichordist Lars Ulrik Mortensen received the award.

== The churches ==
=== The old church ===
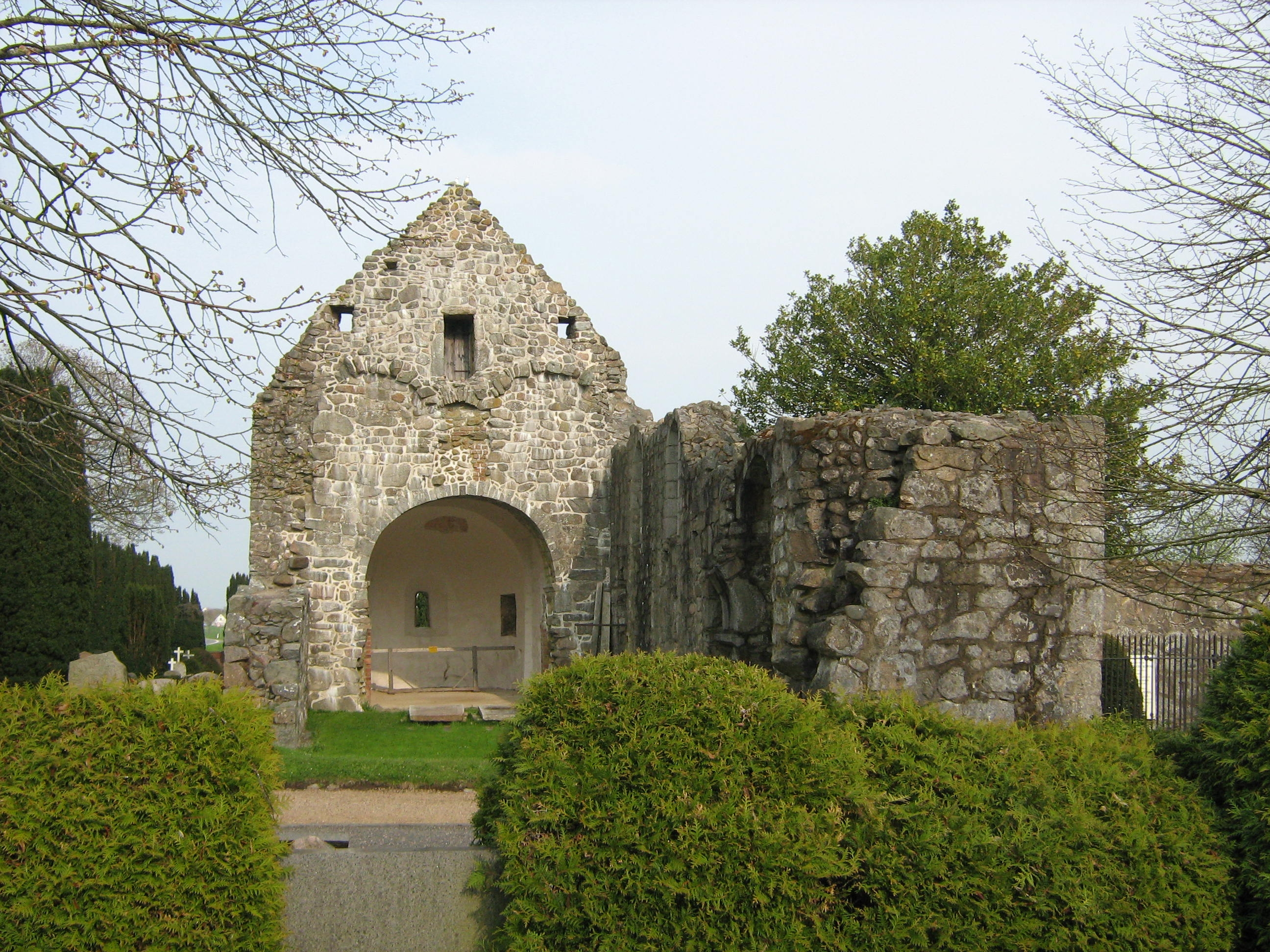
Østermarie Church ruin

In 1885, the tower of the old Romanesque church was in danger of collapsing and had to be demolished. Soon afterwards, it was decided that the entire church should be demolished but when it was found that the building was of considerable architectural interest the work was stopped in 1890. At that time, the south wall and the apsis were still intact. It was discovered that the nave contained two barrel vaults as a ceiling and two pillars at the centre of the church. The pillars supported three arches along the length of the church. Even more interesting was the construction of the chancel where there is a small chamber just above the vault which relieves the pressure on the roof by some 20 tons. The roof itself was covered with Nexø sandstone. Stone roof coverings are quite unusual in Scandinavia, only being found in a few churches in Scania, although the technique was quite common in Ireland. The construction of the chancel arch is also unusual as the centrepiece is a wooden block rather than a stone. The old church is now a listed building and has been maintained by the National Museum of Denmark.

=== The new church ===
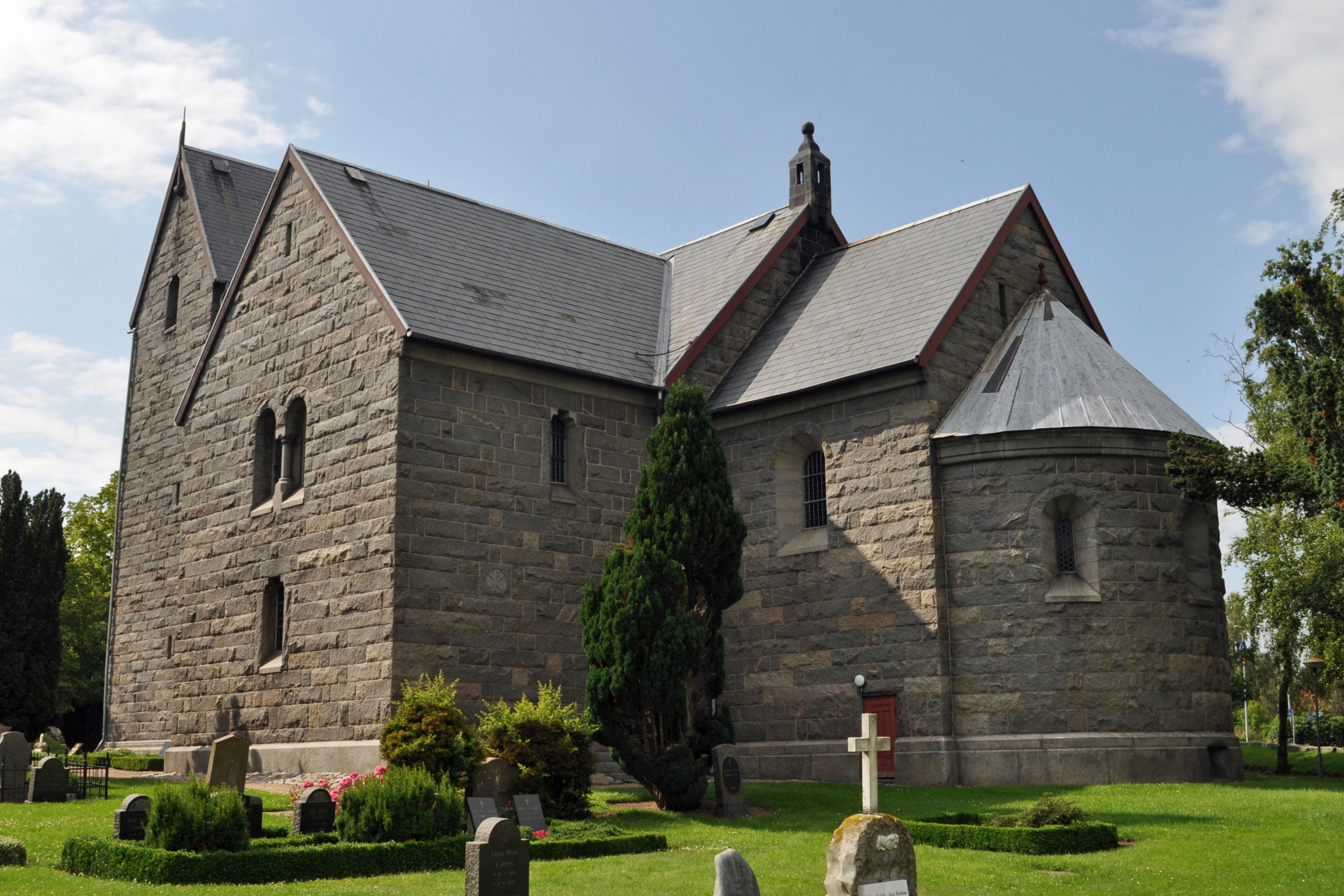
Østermarie Church

The new church was built in 1891 on the place where the old church tower once stood. The architect was Andreas Clemmensen who was involved in the design of Christiansborg Palace. Built in the Romanesque style, it consists of a tower, nave, chancel and apsis together with two cross pieces. The outer wall is granite from the nearby Paradis quarry.

The rear wall of the altar is topped by seven candles in a seven-armed candlestick. The limestone font (ca. 1250), in late Romanesque style, comes from Gotland. The pulpit has four carved panels in oak from 1593. In the northern cross arm, there is an epitaph to Jens Kofoed, popularly credited with the liberation of Bornholm from the Swedes in 1658. The cross below the chancel arch, added during the church's restoration by the architect Rolf Graae in 1964, is the work of Paul Høm, a local artist.

Bornholms Musik Festival arranges concerts in the church with Emma Kirkby and Lars Ulrik Mortensen.

== Runestones ==
A number of stones with runic inscriptions were discovered in the ruins of the old church where they had been used as building materials. They are dated 1075–1125, the transitional period between the Viking Era and the late Middle Ages.

One runestone, which is designated as DR 391 in the Rundata catalogue, stands in the churchyard near the old church but was originally found in its tower. It has a runic inscription that has been transcribed into Old Norse as: Barni/Biarni ok Sibbi ok [T]ofi þeʀ resþu sten æftiʀ Kætil, faþur sin. Kristr hialpi hans siol, in English: "Barni/Biarni and Sibbi and Tófi they raised (the) stone in memory of Ketill, their father, May Christ help his soul." A similar stone, DR 392, was found in the old porch wall and now stands between the old and new churches. Its inscription was transcribed as, Barni/Biarni ok Tofi ok Asgotr letu resa sten æftiʀ Sibba, broþur sin. Kristr sæl hialpi. This translates as: "Barni/Biarni and Tófi and Ásgautr had (the) stone raised in memory of Sibbi, their brother. May Christ help (his) soul." This stone also has an ornamental drawing on the reverse side depicting a propeller-shaped cross. A third stone, DR 394, was found slightly buried in the churchyard and has also been placed in the area between the two churches. Its inscription was transcribed as, Øþi ok Swen ok Øþgiʀ resþu sten æftiʀ Gunulf, broþur sin goþan, ok æftiʀ Gunhild, moþur. In English this reads as, "Auði and Sveinn and Auðgeirr raised the stone in memory of Gunnulfr, their good brother, and in memory of Gunnhildr, (their) mother."

Two additional runestones are located in the city. The inscription on DR 390 is transcribed as, Bofi let resa æftiʀ Økel/Øþkel, faþur sin goþan. Kristr hialpi sialu. The English translation is "Bófi had (the stone) raised in memory of Eykell/Auðkell, his good father. May Christ help (his) soul." The inscription on DR 393 is transcribed as Bofi hoggwa let sten at Þyþkel/Þorkel, which translates as "Bófi had the stone cut in memory of Þjóðkell/Þorkell."

== Neighbouring places of interest ==
Østermarie is a 15-minute drive from Gudhjem, which features streets leading to the town centre and fishing harbour, and from Svaneke, which contains half-timbered houses and mansions (now hotels) along the harbour.

Fru Petersens Café opened in 1997.

== See also ==
- Bornholm
