= Fru Petersens Café =

Coordinates: 55°08′12″N 14°59′50″E

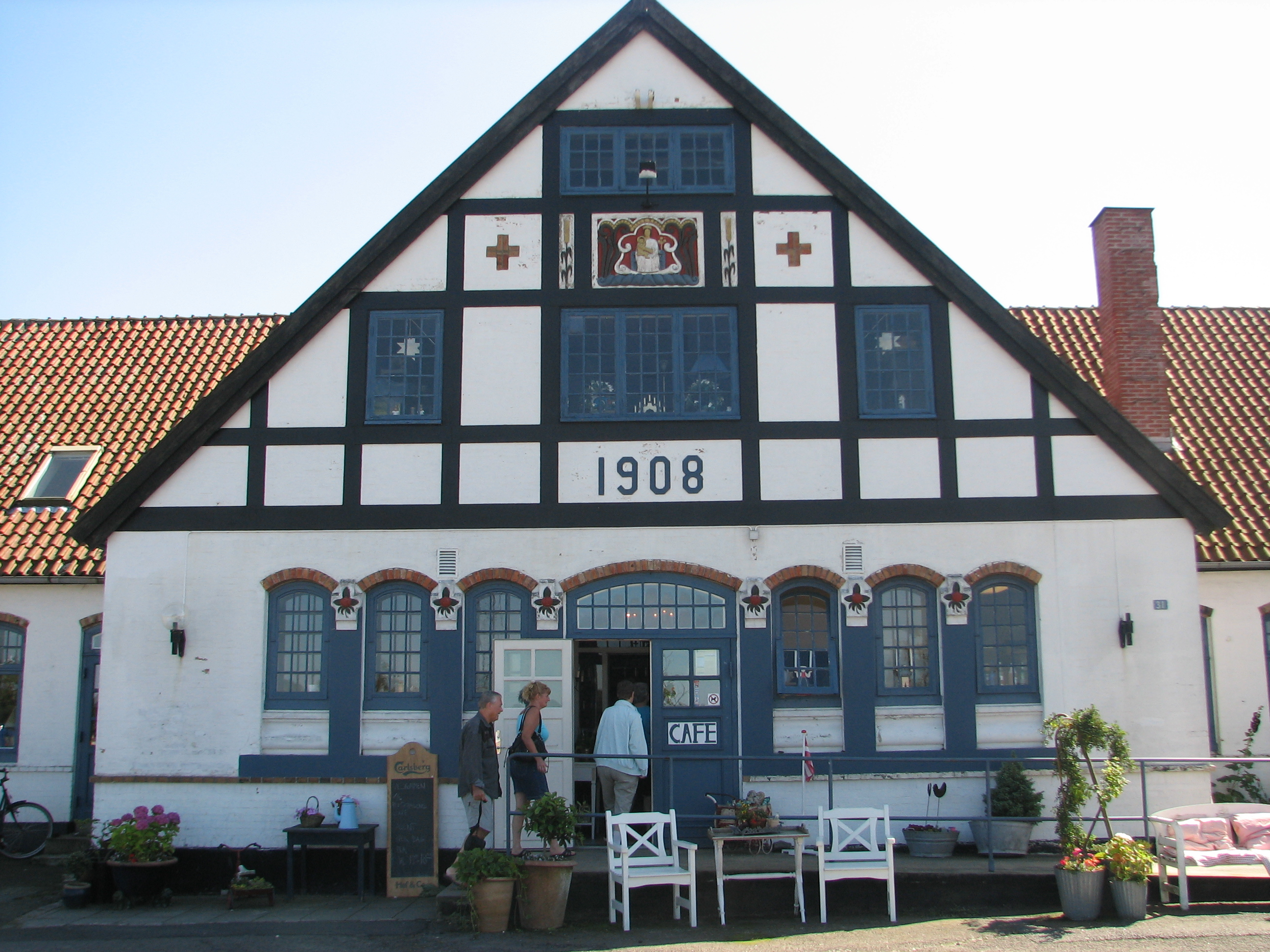
Fru Petersens Café

Fru Petersens Café (Mrs. Petersen's Café) is an establishment located along the main road (Almindingenvej) about 1 kilometre (0.62 mi) west of Østermarie, Bornholm, Denmark, established in 1993.

== History ==
The building was designed by architect Mathias Bidstrup, completed in 1908 and used as a church school. The school was the most important of the four schools that belonged to Østermarie parish.

In the gable above the entrance, a relief was placed depicting the Virgin Mary, the parish's patron saint.

The school was closed in 1967, and was then put into use as a training school for disabled children. From the academic year 1979/1980 the building was used as a special school for mentally handicapped adults.

In 1993 the building was sold and converted into a café, opened in 1997. The rooms are furnished as they were in the old days, as if time has stood still. In the living room, coffee and cake is now served. In 2010, the café came into new ownership but is as it was before.

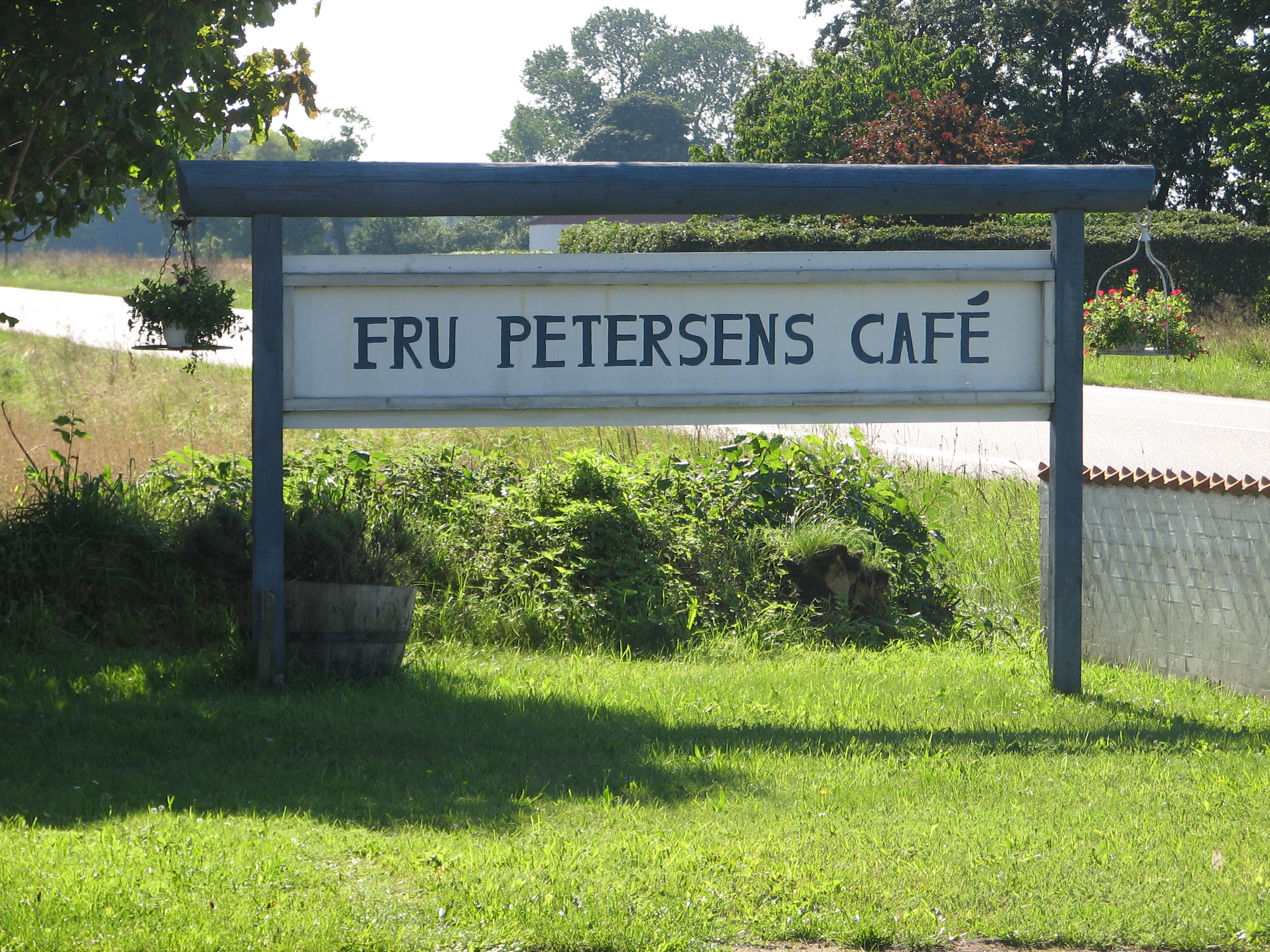
Sign

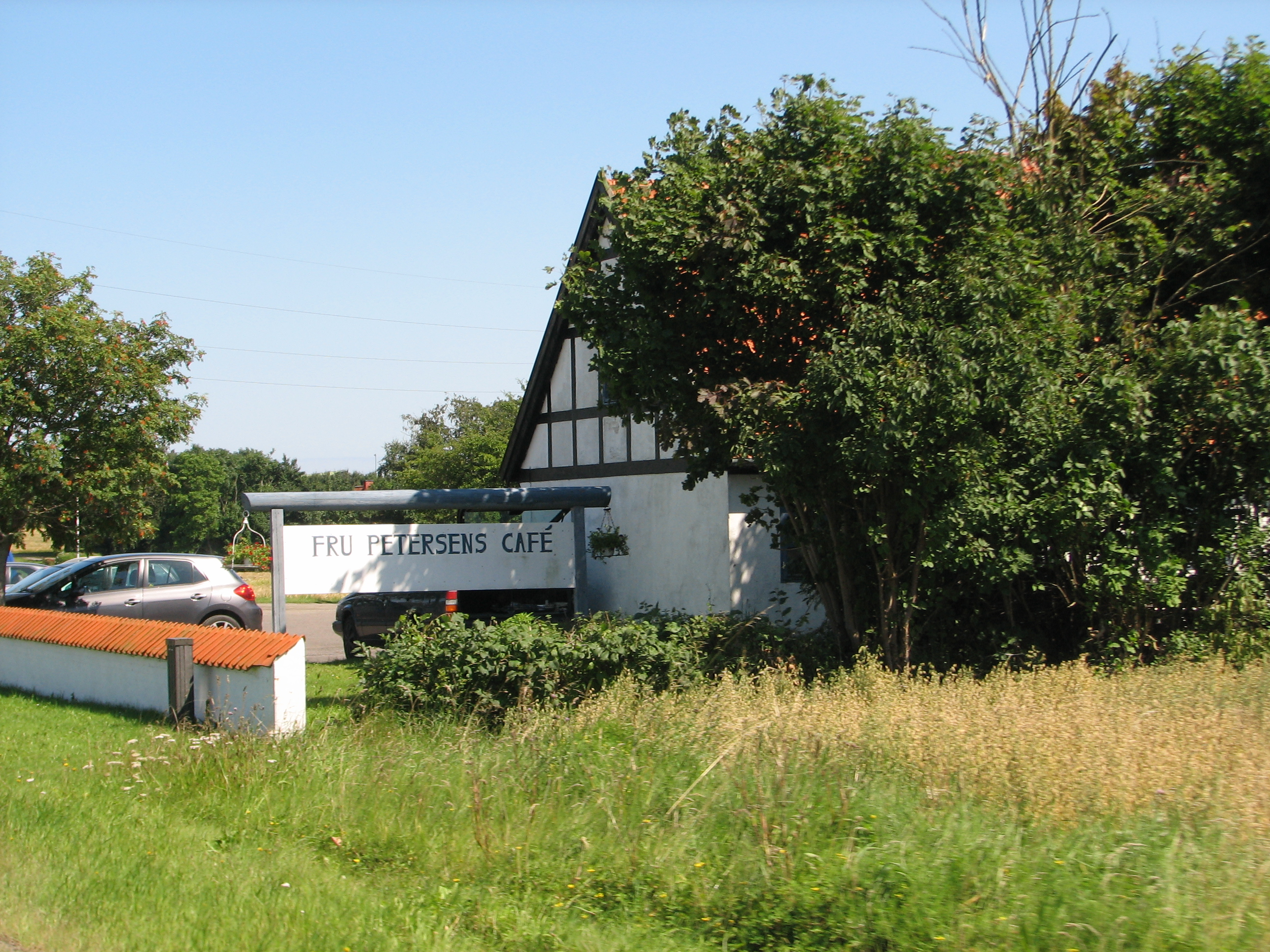
Fru Petersens Café

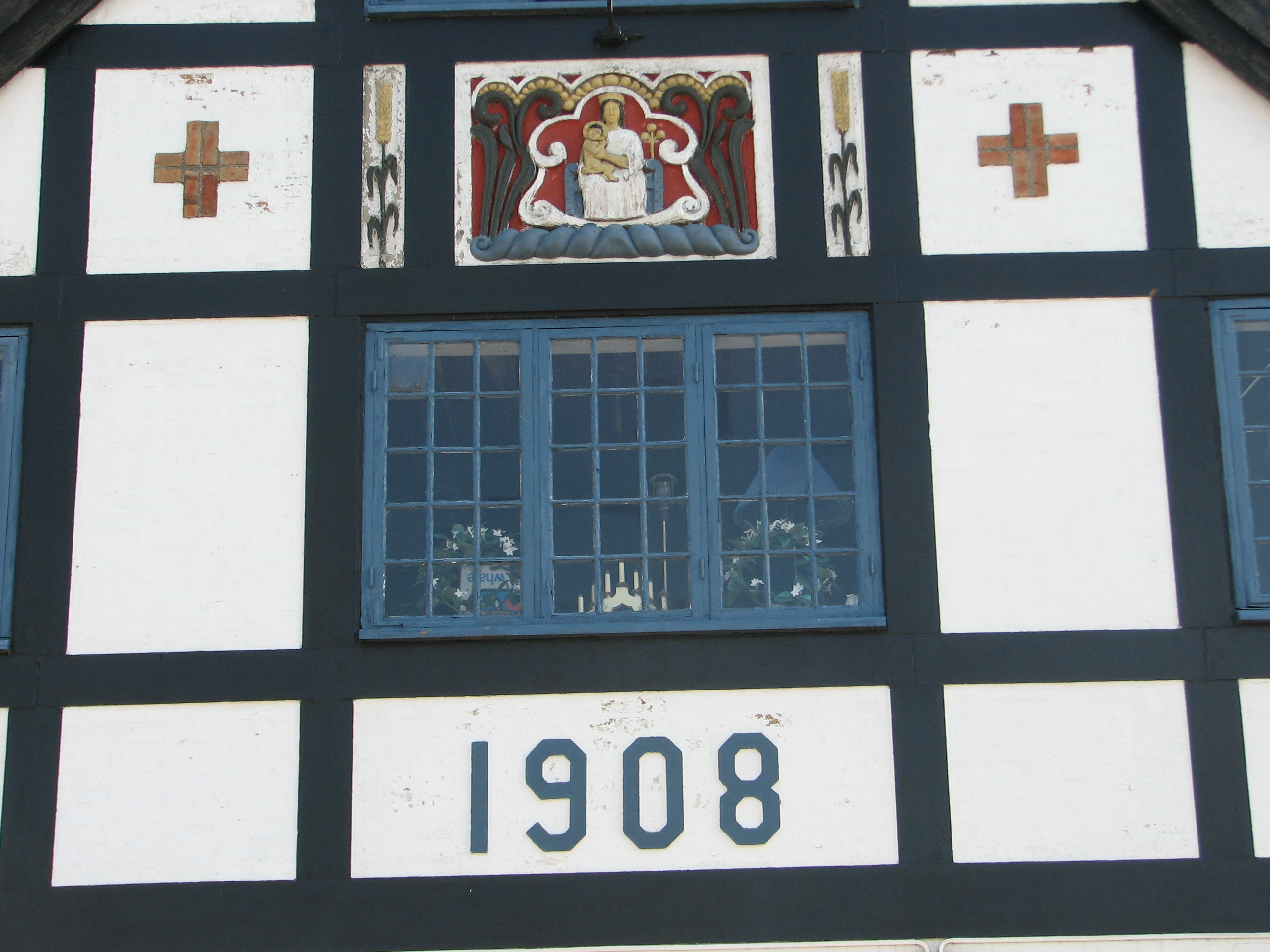
Gable stones

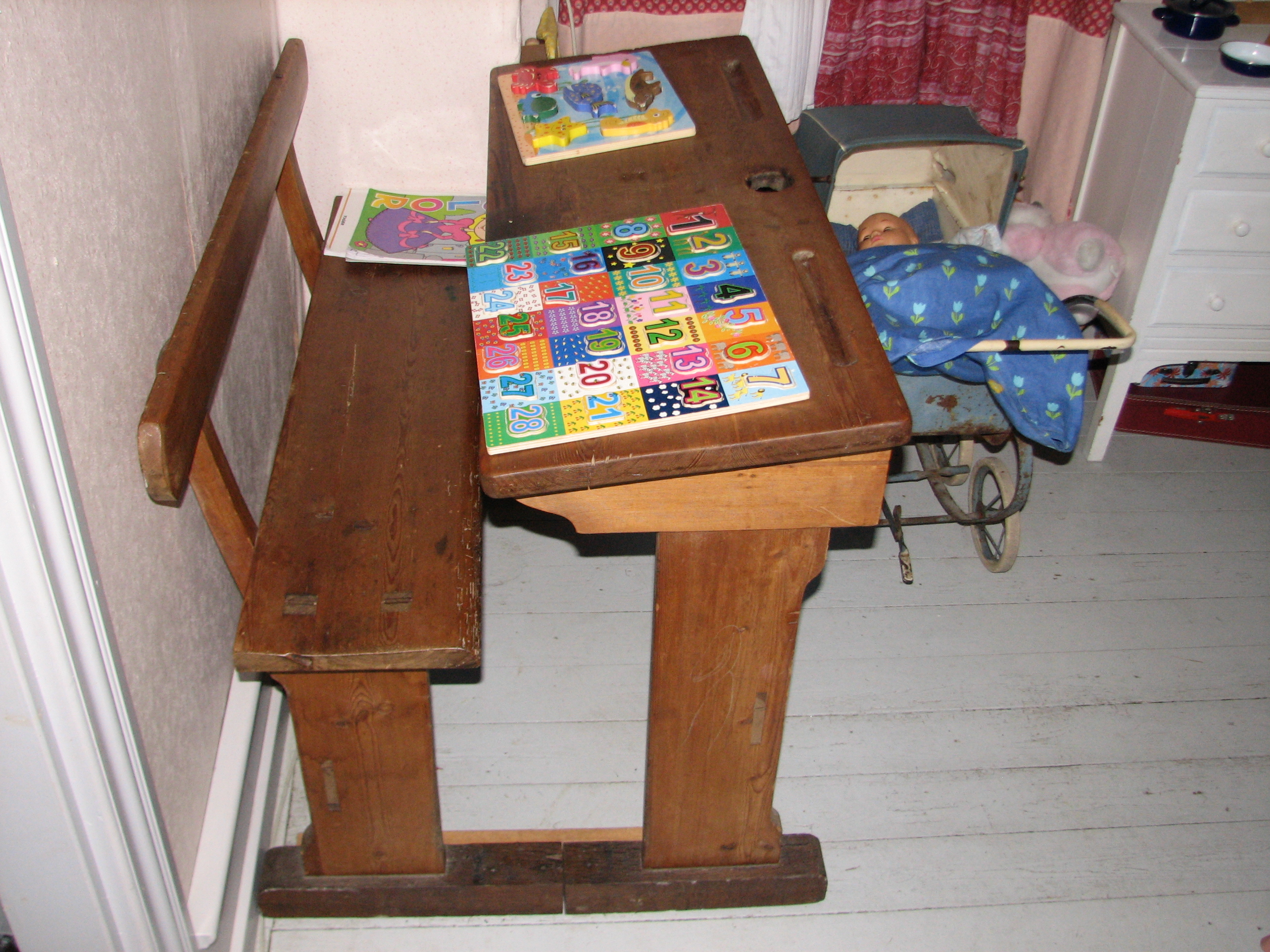
School bench from the church school

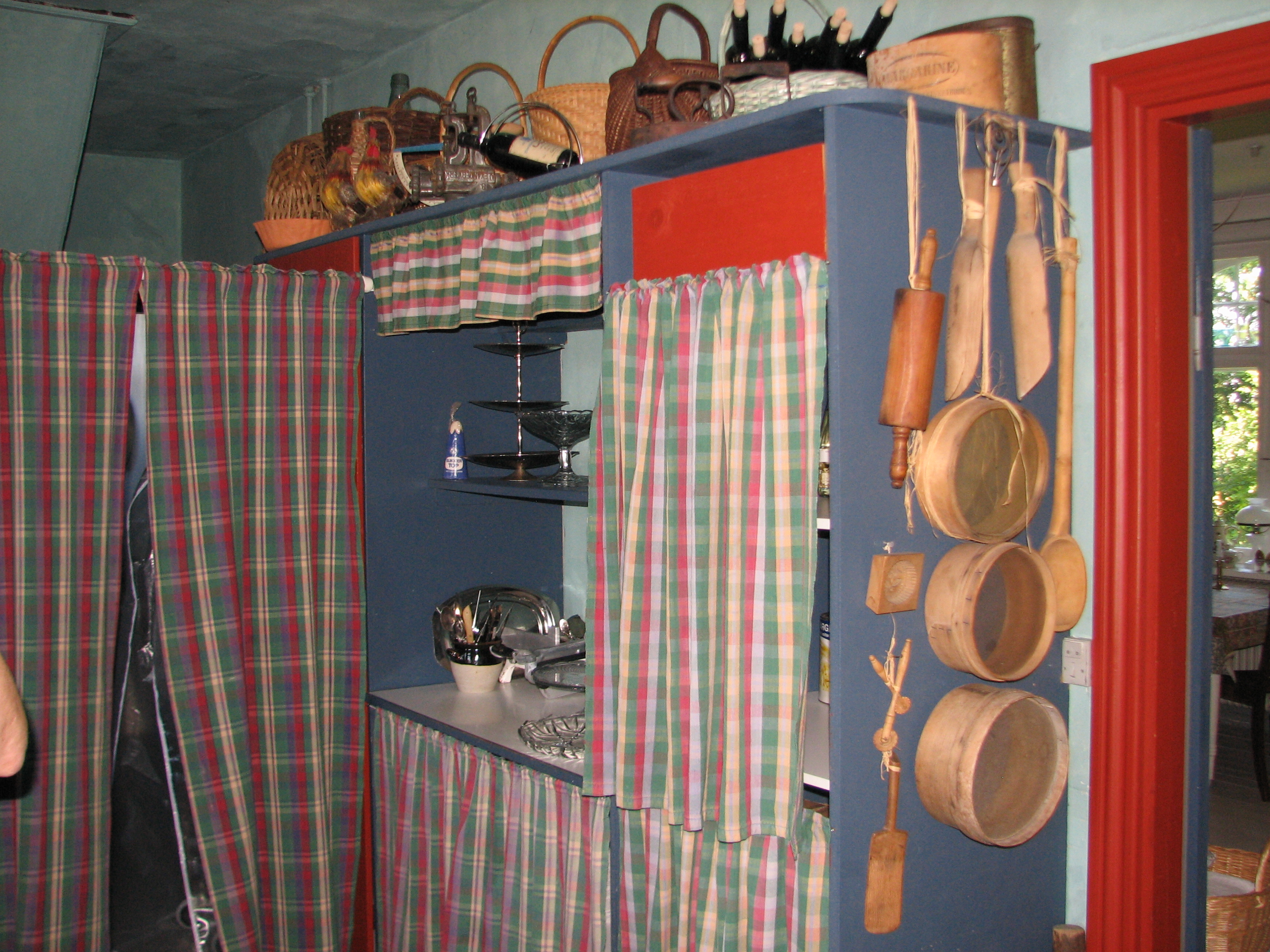
The kitchen corner in Fru Petersens Café
