= Paul Høm =

Danish artist

Paul Briegel Høm (2 May 1905, Ballerup – 25 September 1994, Gudhjem) was a Danish artist who is remembered for his religious paintings and brightly coloured stained glass windows which decorate a number of Danish churches.

== Biography ==
Høm studied at the Danish Academy from 1924 to 1929 under Aksel Jorgensen and Sigurd Wandel. His painting, primarily inspired by Jørgensen, was mainly of members of his family, especially his wife and children whom he depicted in strong bright colours. In 1943, he moved to Gudhjem on the island of Bornholm where his work benefitted from the bright light and his friendship with Helge Nielsen.

He decorated a number of churches with altarpieces, frescos and mosaics, especially on Bornholm, often working with the architect Rolf Graae. His work can also be found in Kvong Church near Varde, Bräkne-Hoby in Blekinge (1957–59) and Christian's Church in Lyngby. Several of his works were completed together with Lisbeth Munch-Petersen whom he married in 1947. Together they made stained glass windows for Ribe Cathedral in 1973 and works for Struer Church including stained glass windows and a large ceramic altar cross in 1984.

From 1933, Høm exhibited his work at the spring and autumn exhibitions at Charlottenborg and at Den Frie Udstilling. He was awarded the Eckersberg Medal in 1939.

== Selected works ==
- Altarpiece in Albæk Church (1947)
- Altarpiece in Hæstrup Church (1947)
- Frescoes, altar paintings, tapestry and stained glass window in Kvong Church (1956)
- Stained glass windows in Faster Church (1957)
- Altarpiece paintings in Bryndum Church (1959)
- Cross and frescos in Christian's Church, Lyngby (1963)
- Five stained glass windows in Ribe Cathedral together with Lisbet Munch-Petersen (1973), removed to Kastel Church in Rønne in 1986
- Tapestry in Ballerup West Church together with Vibeke Høegsbro (1973)
- Altarpiece in Vognsild Church (1974)
- Crucifix in Østermarie Church (1974)
- Altarpiece and stained glass windows in Struer Church (1981)
- Altar paintings, lamb mosaic, pulpit paintings and organ facade in St. Clement's Church, Klemensker (1960–1981).
