= Andreas Clemmensen =

Danish architect and royal building inspector

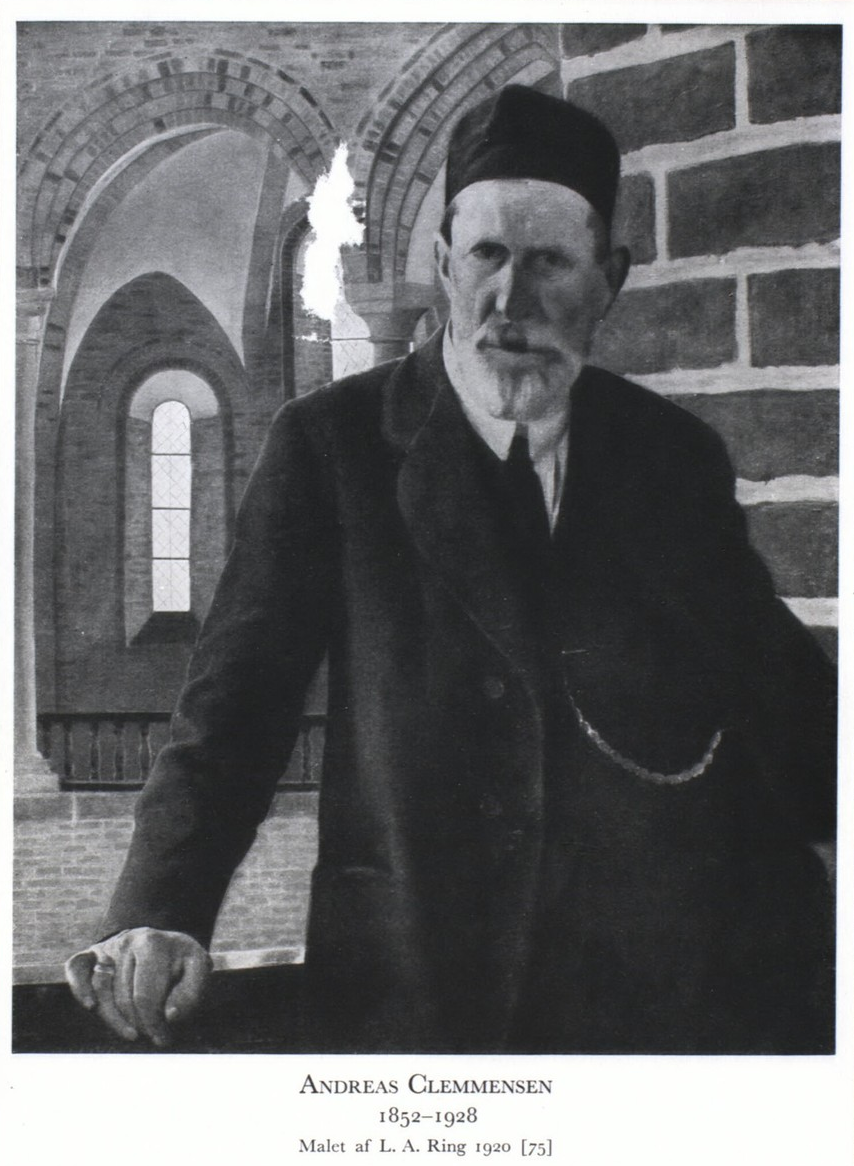
- Clemmensen painted by L.A. Ring, 1920
- Born: 7 August 1852; Leck, Duchy of Schleswig
- Died: 5 December 1928 (aged 76); Copenhagen, Denmark
- Occupation: Architect

Signature
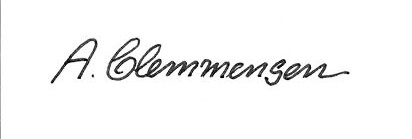

Andreas Clemmensen (7 August 1852 – 5 December 1928) was a Danish architect and royal building inspector.

== Early life and education ==
Clemmensen was born on 7 August 1852 in Leck, Duchy of Schleswig, the son of Carl Frederik Clemmensen and Charlotte Laurence Hass. He trained at C.V. Nielsens Tegneskole and was admitted to the Royal Danish Academy of Fine Arts in 1867, from which he left as an architect in 1875. During his studies he was a draftsman for Johan Daniel Herholdt and Hans J. Holm. He conducted travel studies in Italy, France, England and the Netherlands in the years 1880-83 and again in Italy 1901, 1906, 1921 and 1923. He was in Sweden in 1921.

== Career ==
Clemmensen was chairman of the Academic Association of Architects (Academic Arkitektforening) 1904–07, royal building inspector 1904–1911. He was the architect of Roskilde Cathedral from 1914. He exhibited drawings at Charlottenborg Spring Exhibition in 1876, 1887, 1892, 1900, 1909, 1910 and 1929. In 1916 he became Knight of the Order of the Dannebrog.

== Personal life ==
Clemmensen was married in 1884 with Dagmar Sofie Becker (1859 - 1917). He was the father of son Eigil Clemmensen (1890 – 1932) and Mogens Clemmensen (1885–1943). He died on 5 December 1928 in Copenhagen and is buried at Assistens Cemetery.

== Selected works ==
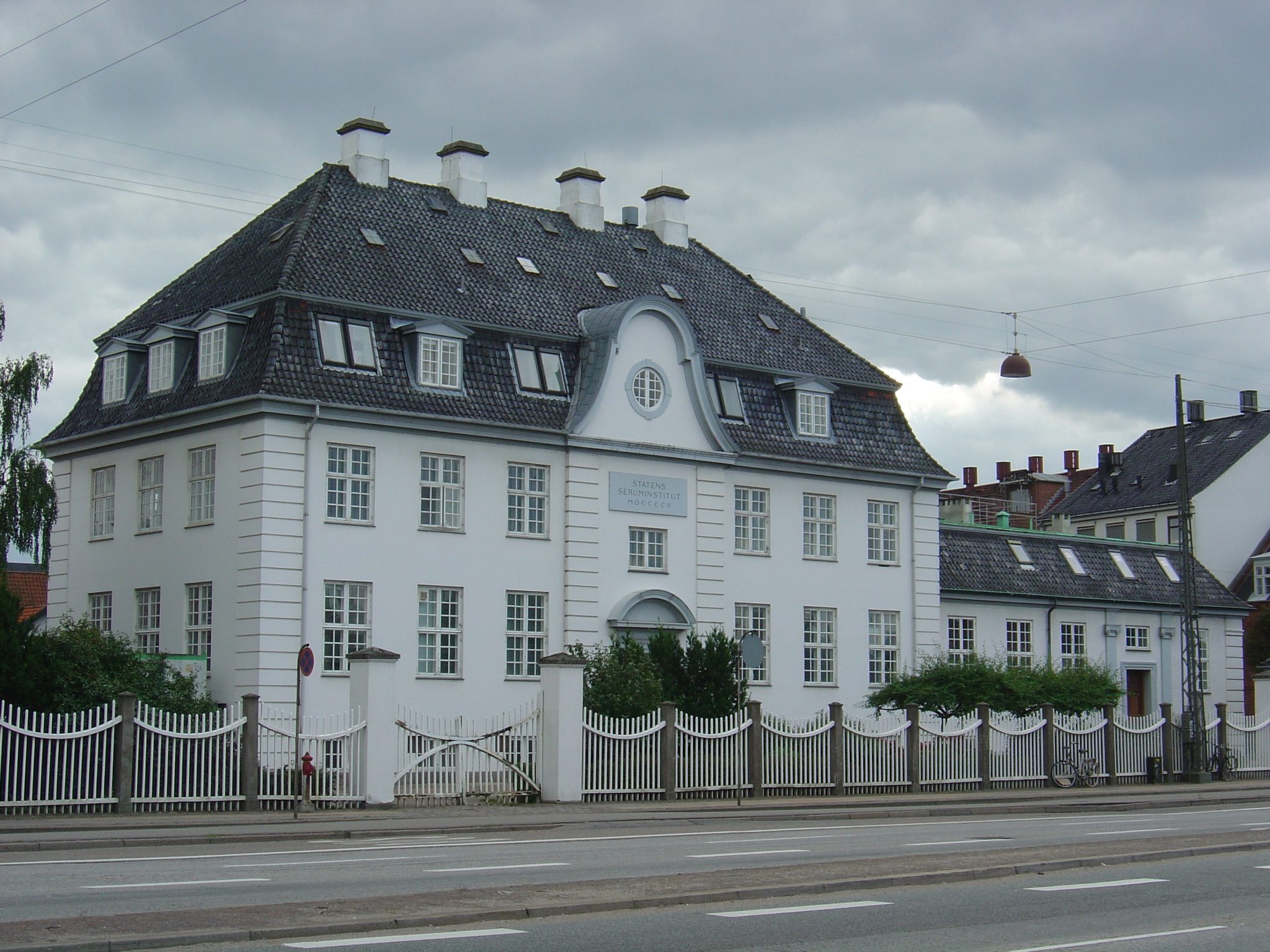
Statens Serum Institute

- Stockholmsgade 27 (1890–92)
- Østermarie Church, Bornholm (1891)
- Immanuel Church, Copenhagen (1892)
- Otto Benzon House, Copenhagen (1896–97)
- Statens Serum Institut (1902)
- Shuvalov Palace, Talne, Ukraine (1903)
- L. A. Ring House, Roskilde (1912–13)
- Palads Teatret, Copenhagen (1912)
- Hellerup Cemetery, Copenhagen (1913–14)
