= Østermarie Church =

Church building in Bornholm Regional Municipality, Denmark

Coordinates: 55°08′18″N 15°0′58″E

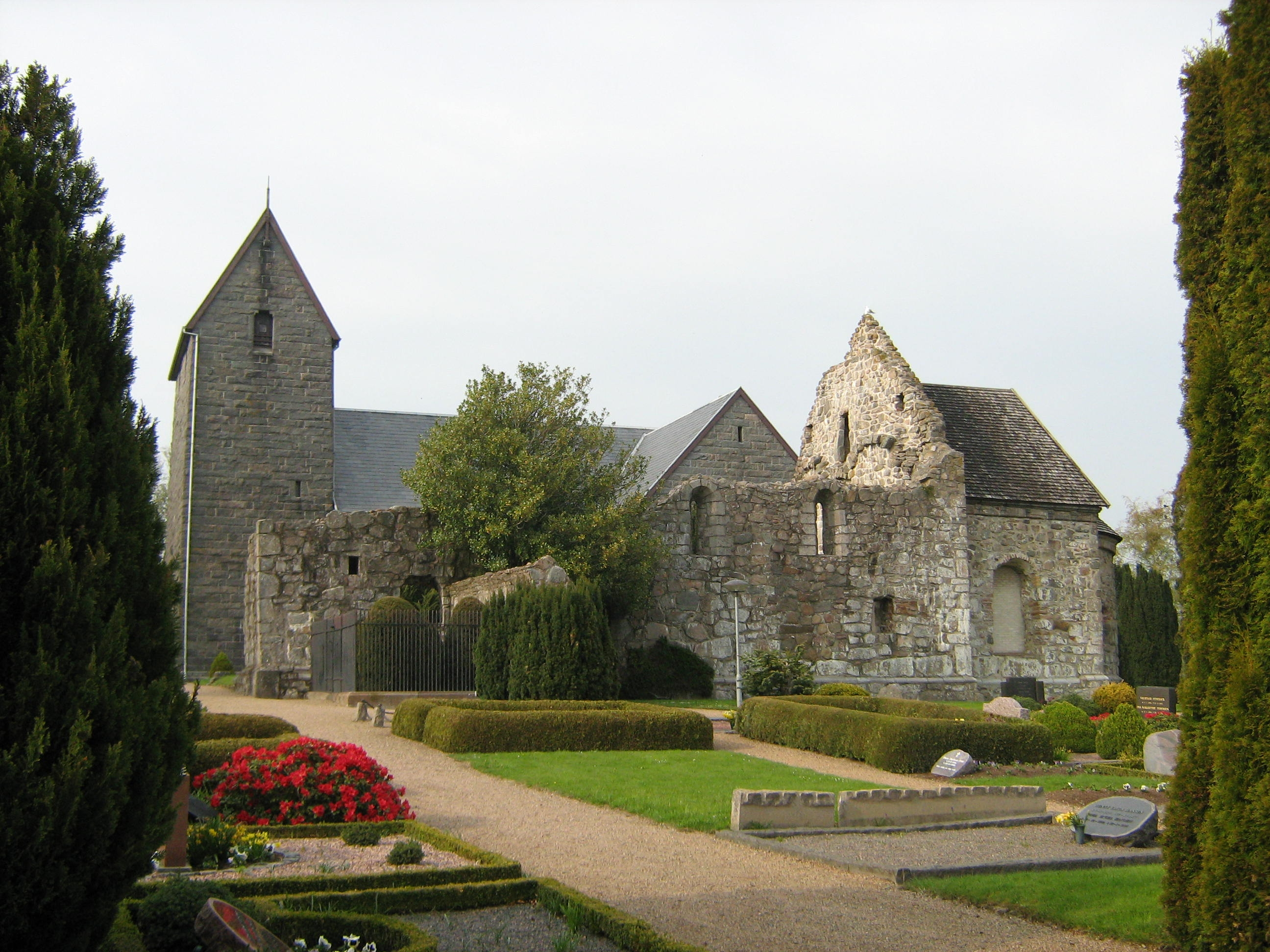
The old and new churches of Østermarie

Østermarie Church, in the village of Østermarie near Svaneke on the Danish island of Bornholm, was originally built in the early 13th century. While it was being demolished in 1890, it was discovered it was of considerable architectural interest and work was stopped. The new church from 1891 is also in the Romanesque style.

== The old church ==
In 1885, the tower of the old Romanesque church was in danger of collapsing and had to be demolished. Soon afterwards, it was decided that the entire church should be demolished but when it was found that the building was of considerable architectural interest the work was stopped in 1890. At that time, the south wall and the apse were still intact. It was discovered that the nave contained two barrel vaults as a ceiling and two pillars at the centre of the church. The pillars supported three arches along the length of the church. Even more interesting was the construction of the chancel where there is a small chamber just above the vault which relieves the pressure on the roof by some 20 tons. The roof itself was covered with Nexø sandstone. Stone roof coverings are quite unusual in Scandinavia, only being found in a few churches in Scania, although the technique was quite common in Ireland. The construction of the chancel arch is also unusual as the centrepiece is a wooden block rather than a stone. The old church is now a listed building and has been maintained by the National Museum of Denmark.

== The new church ==
The new church was built in 1891 on the place where the old church tower once stood. The architect was Andreas Clemmensen who was involved in the design of Christiansborg Palace. Built in the Romanesque style, it consists of a tower, nave, chancel and apse together with two cross pieces. The outer wall is granite from the nearby Paradis quarry.

The rear wall of the altar is topped by seven candles in a seven-armed candlestick. The limestone font (ca. 1250), in late Romanesque style, comes from Gotland. The pulpit has four carved panels in oak from 1593. In the northern cross arm, there is an epitaph to Jens Kofoed, popularly credited with the liberation of Bornholm from the Swedes in 1658. The cross below the chancel arch, added during the church's restoration by the architect Rolf Graae in 1964, is the work of Paul Høm, a local artist.

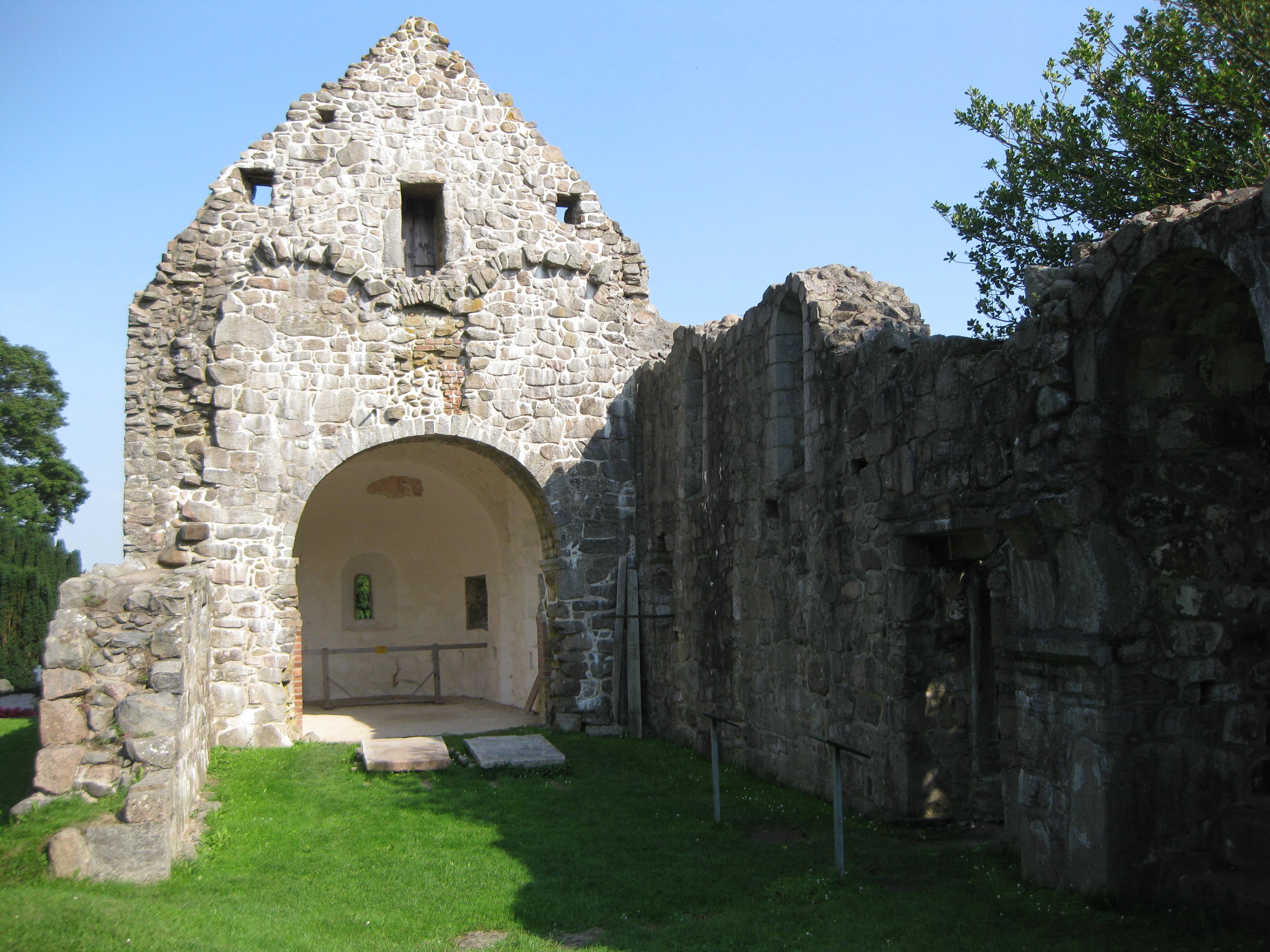
The old ruin

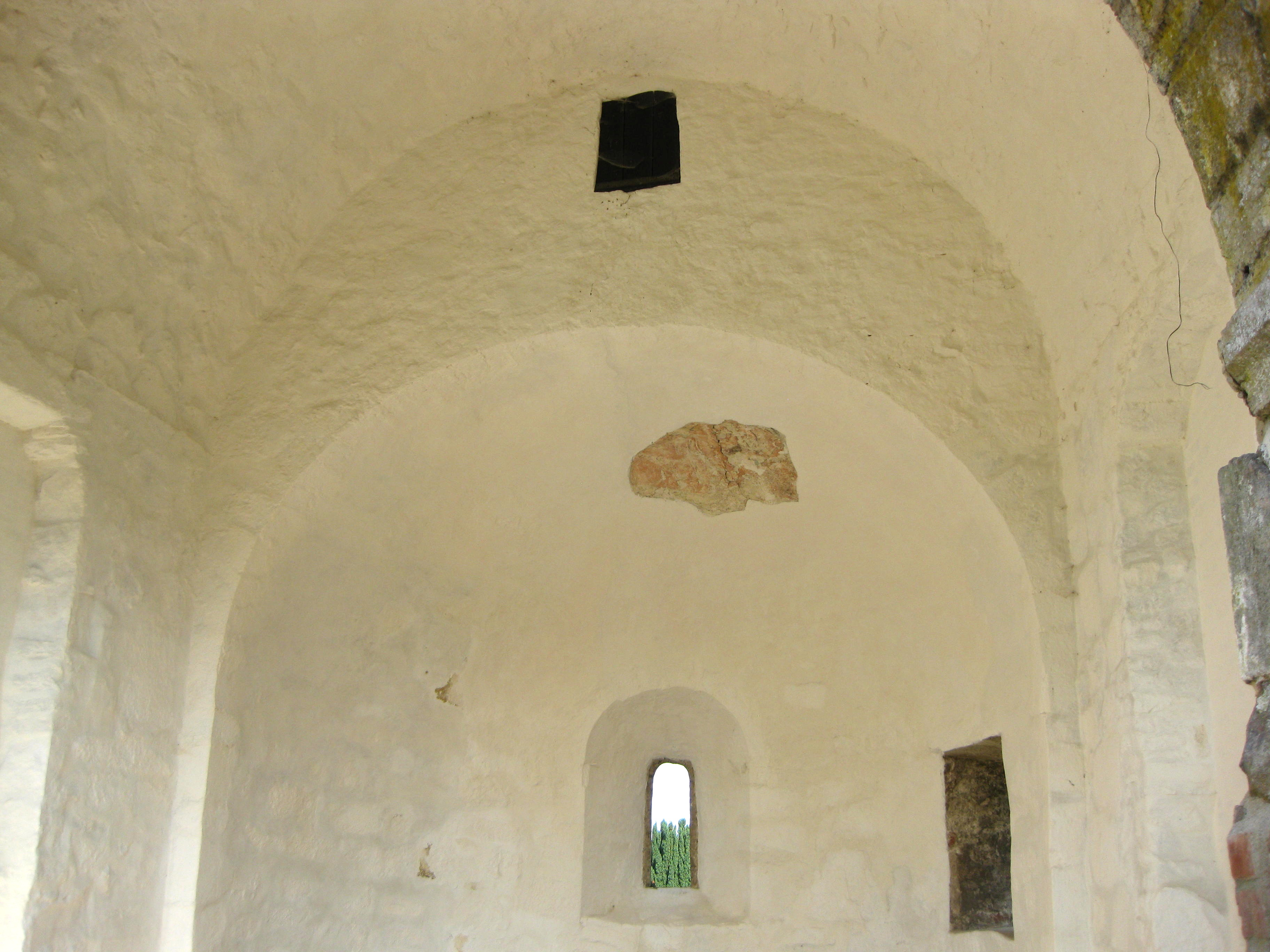
Apse of the ruin

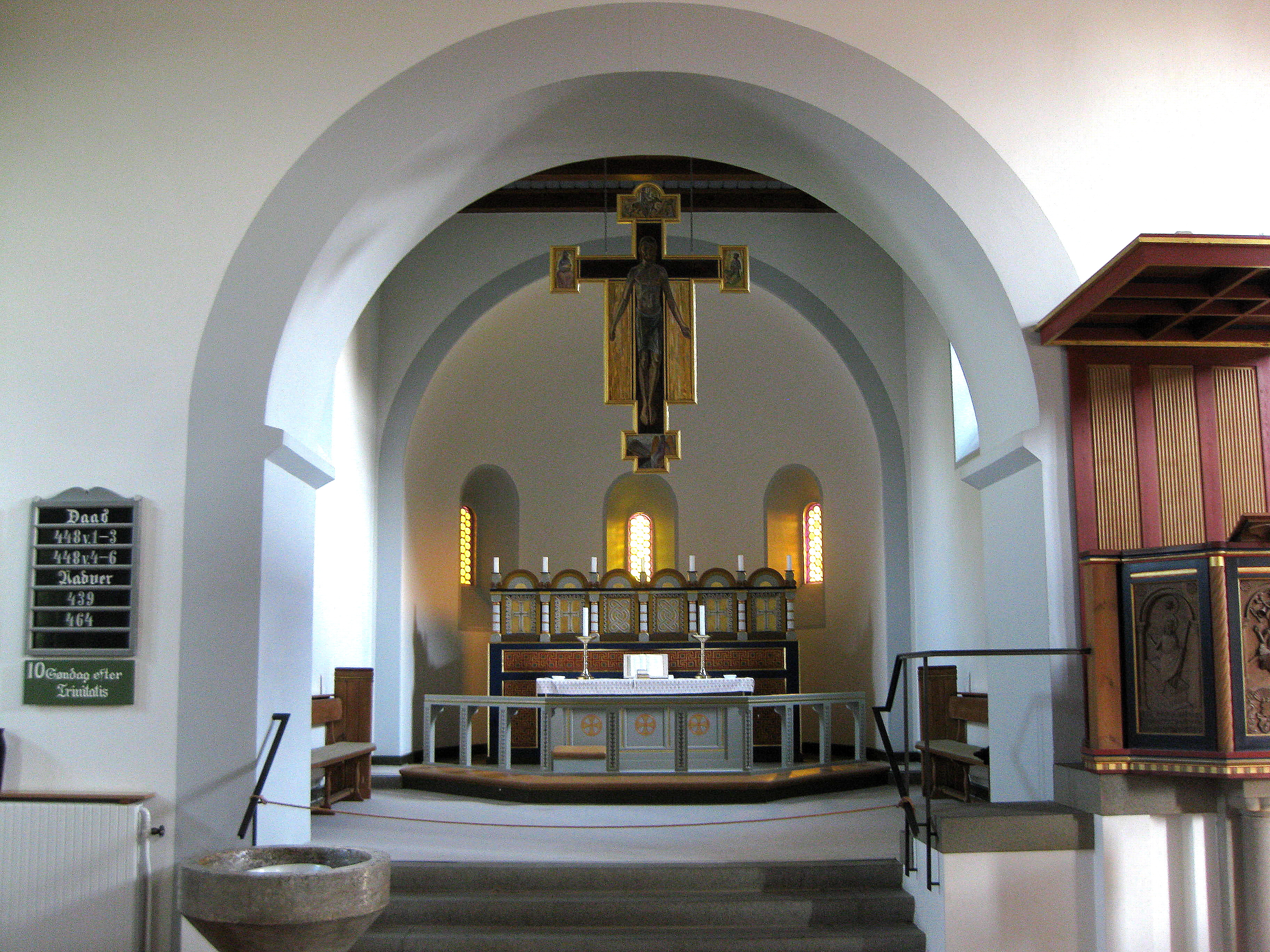
The new church

== See also ==
- List of churches on Bornholm
