= Rolf Graae =

Danish architect

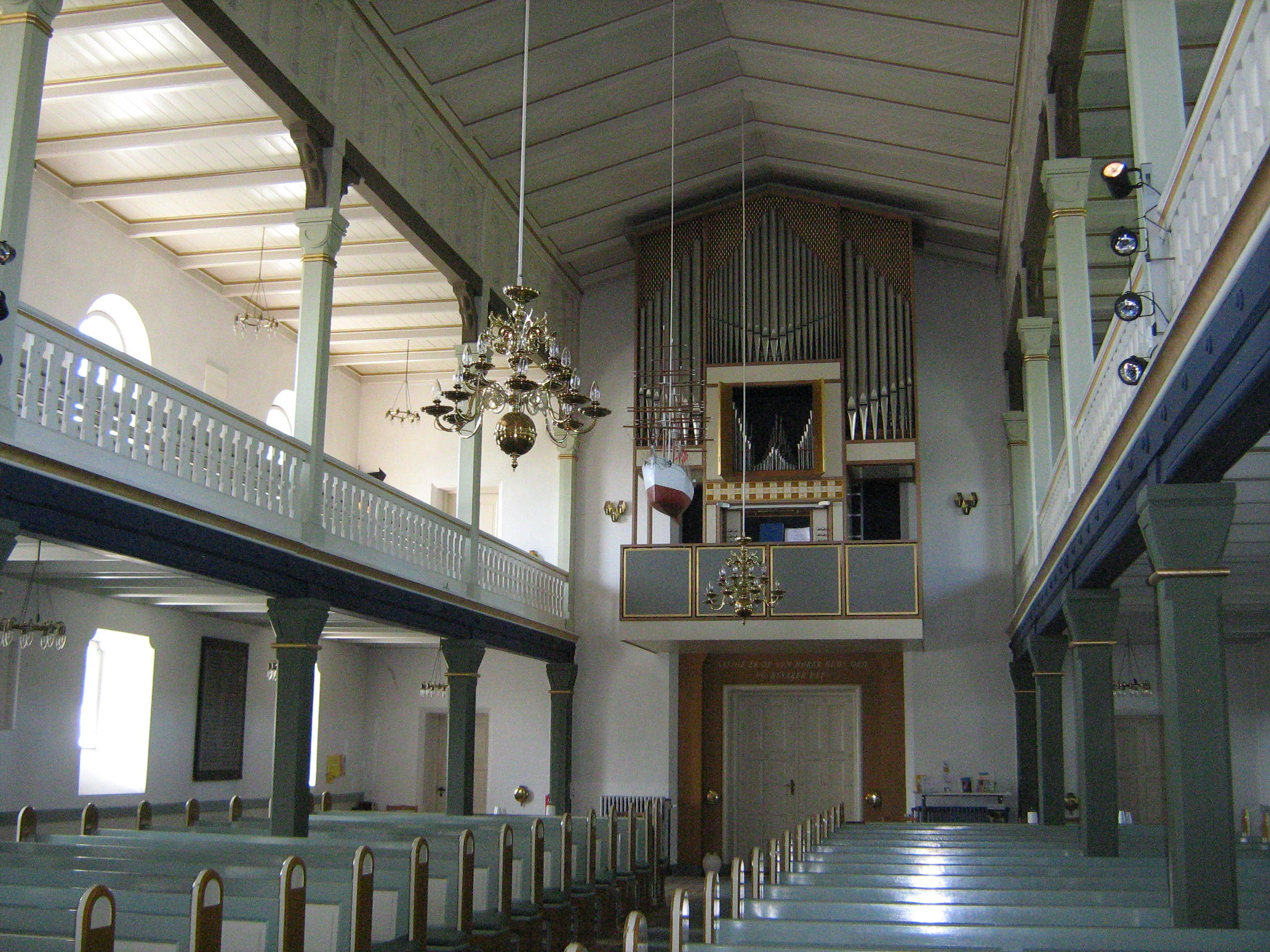
Rolf Graae: Renovated church interior and organ facade, St Clement's Church, Bornholm (1974)

Rolf Saenger Graae (29 September 1916 – 16 September 1996) was a Danish architect who is remembered for the churches and religious works he completed or restored in the style of the Klint school. He is also considered to be Denmark's most important 20th century organ designer.

== Early life ==
The son of a successful bank employee, Graae was born in Copenhagen, and first studied the history of art at Copenhagen University (1934–38) before attending the architecture school at the Danish Academy where he graduated in 1943. He served terms with Mogens Koch, Kay Fisker, Eiler Græbe and Kaare Klint (1946–48).

== Career ==
From 1950 to 1991, Graae coordinated over 300 church restoration projects in addition to planning four new churches and several other related works. His style emulated that of Kaare Klint, observing the principles of sound Danish architecture. His restoration work was based first and foremost on artistic objectives. Having completed more than 200 organ projects, Graae is considered to be Denmark's most important 20th century organ designer. He died in Hellerup.

== Selected works ==
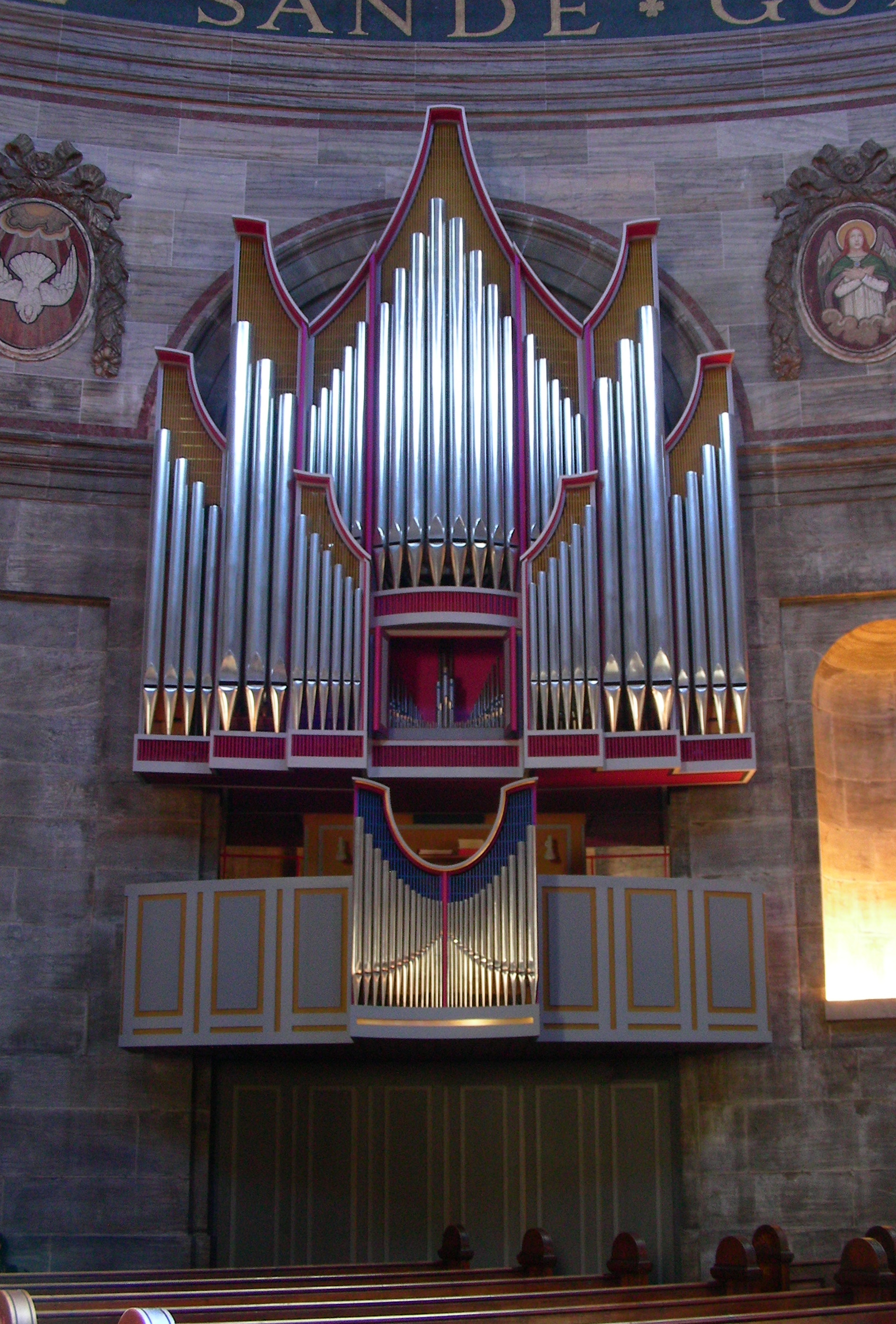
Rolf Graae: Organ facade, Frederick's Church, Copenhagen (1963)

- Østerlars Church, Bornholm, restoration together with Paul Høm (1955)
- Risbjerg Church, Copenhagen, church design together with Helge Schønnemann (1959)
- St. Clement's Church, Bornholm, restoration and organ design (from 1960)
- Stengård Church, Bagsværd, church design together with Vilhelm Wohlert (1962)
- Frederick's Church, Copenhagen, organ design (1963)
- Østermarie Church, Bornholm, restoration (1964)
- Margrethekirken, Valby, church design together with Vilhelm Wohlert (1971)
- Sankt Jørgens Kirke (St George's Church), Næstved, church design together with Erling Jessen and Vilhelm Wohlert (1978)
- Himmelev Church, organ design (1985)
- Bryndom Church, southwest Jutland, organ design (1990)

== Bibliography ==
- Graae, Rolf: Hellerup Kirke, Copenhagen, Krohns Bogtrykkeri, 1975, 64 pages (in Danish)
- Graae, Rolf; Jessen, Erling: Stubbekøbing kirke, Maribo amt: beskrivelser, Denmark, 1985, 238 pages (in Danish)
- Graae, Rolf; Olesen, Ole: Fortegnelse over ældre orgler i danske kirker, Copenhagen, Det danske Orgelselskab, 1987, 12 pages (in Danish)
