= St. Bodil's Church =

Church building in Bornholm Regional Municipality, Denmark

Coordinates: 55°03′43″N 15°04′22″E

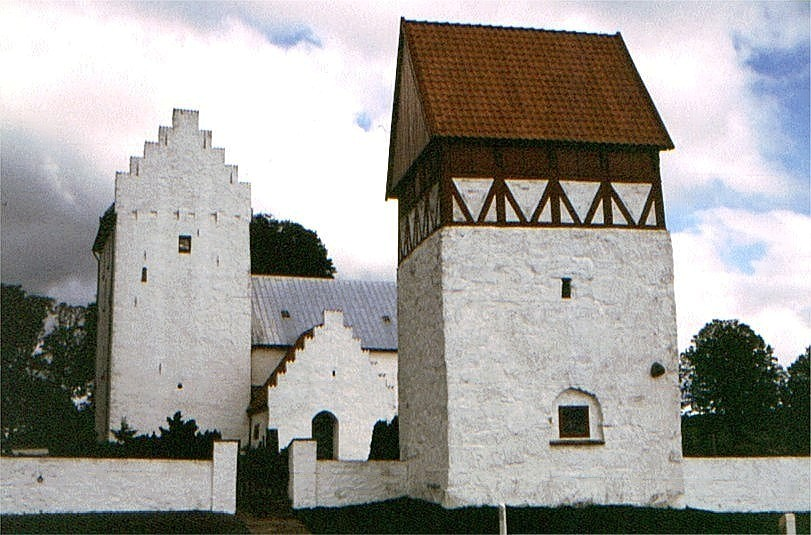
St. Bodil's Church with its half-timbered bell tower

St. Bodil's Church (Danish: Sankt Bodils Kirke) is a parish church dating from the 13th century located in Denmark, 4 km west of Nexø on the Danish island of Bornholm.

== History ==
Built around 1200, the church was dedicated to the English saint Botulf but by 1530 it had mistakenly become known by the woman's name "Bodil" although there has never been a Saint Bodil. As a result, the parish is called Bodilsker (Bodil's Church in Bornholm dialect). The church first belonged to the Archbishopric of Lund, then came under the Danish crown at the time of the Reformation. In the 19th century, it became fully independent. In 1903, as congregations grew, the church was threatened with demolition and reconstruction along the lines of Østermarie Church. Thanks to pressure from the National Museum to preserve it in the interests of national heritage action was delayed. The problem of capacity was solved in 1911 by adding a large transept. The church tower was renovated c. 1913 by the architect Mathias Bidstrup.

== Architecture ==
The church consists of an apse, chancel and nave from the Romanesque period, slightly more recent west tower and a Late-Gothic porch for the south door. Foundations unearthed beside the tower indicate that it had originally been planned as a larger addition. There are two rounded arches giving access from the nave to the base of the tower. The large north transept was added in 1911. Although some local sandstone and fieldstone has been used, the predominant building material is limestone which in particular has been used for the door and window frames. The apse ceiling consists of a half-dome vault. There were only three windows in the original building, one in the apse which was restored in 1874 and one on each side of the nave. New windows have since been added. Both the Romanesque portals have been almost fully preserved. The stonework on the south door is particularly well executed.

The bell tower, first documented in 1624, is topped by a half-timbered section and originally served as an entrance portal. The main structure dates from around 1600. Minor repairs were carried out in the 18th century.

== Inventory and fittings ==
Close to the entrance, the former Romanesque font, made of Gotland limestone, is similar to those in Ny Kirke and Vestermarie Church but better proportioned. The new granite font stands to the left of the chancel arch. Above the old font is part of the former Renaissance altarpiece, a painting of Christ on the road to Emmaus by Jørgen Roed. The two candlesticks on the main altar date from the mid 16th century. The carved oak pulpit from c. 1600 has four panels depicting the evangelists and their symbols.

== Local legend ==
On one of the bell tower walls, a round stone known as the Devil's Hat (Fandens hat) can be seen. The local legend tells of how a priest was followed by the devil as he returned home one night. He reached the churchyard before he could be caught but the devil was so furious he hurled his hat at the priest. It did not hit him but instead was lodged in the wall of the bell tower where it can still be seen today.

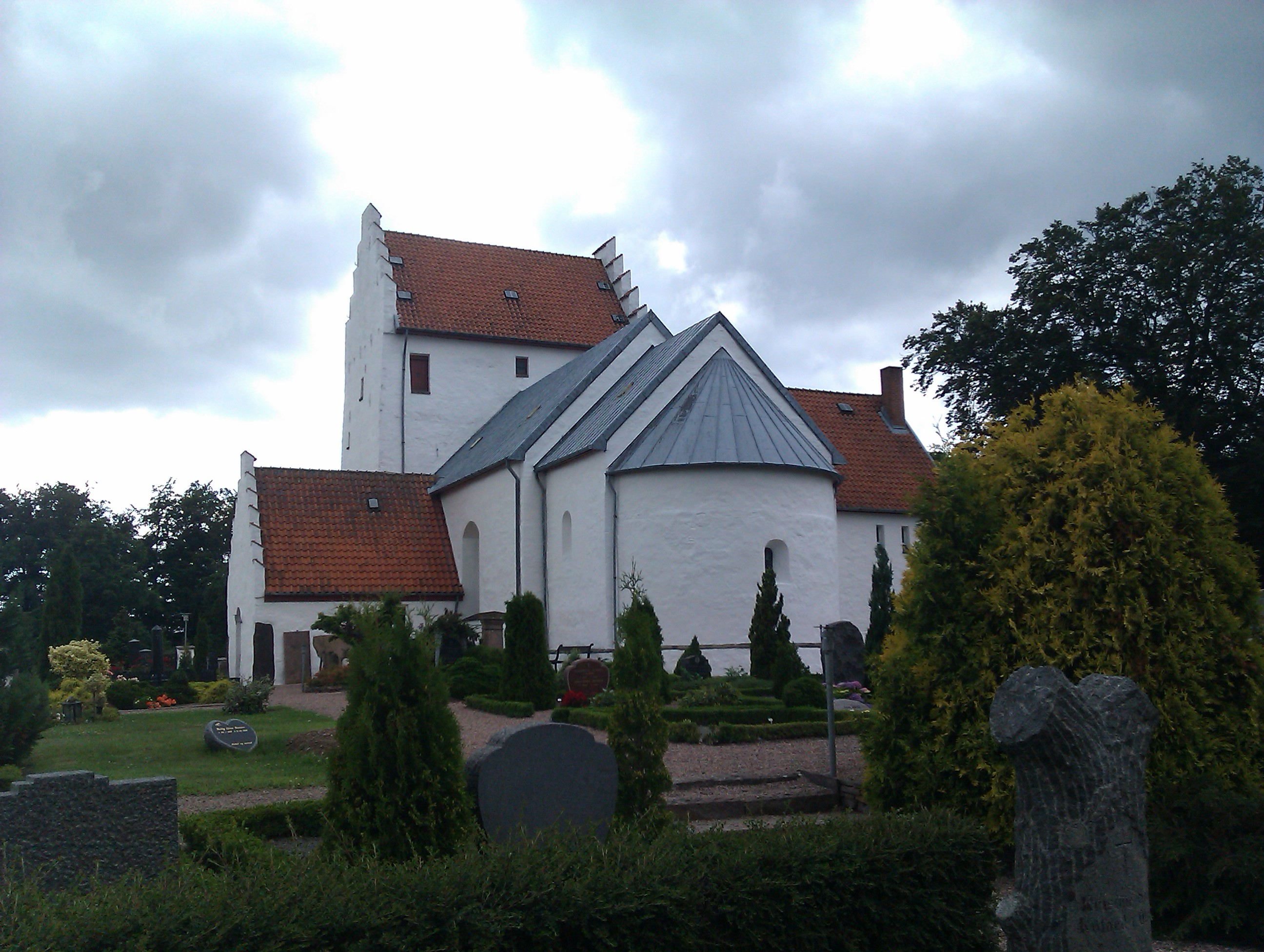
Seen from the east

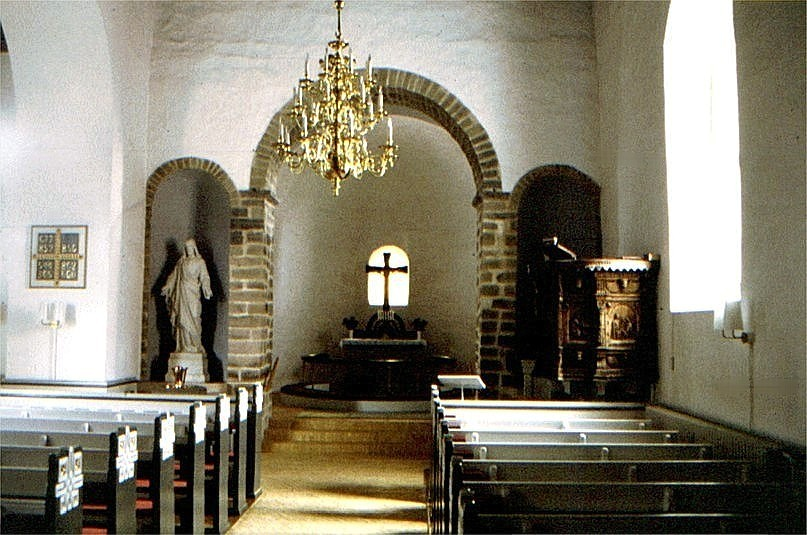
Nave and chancel

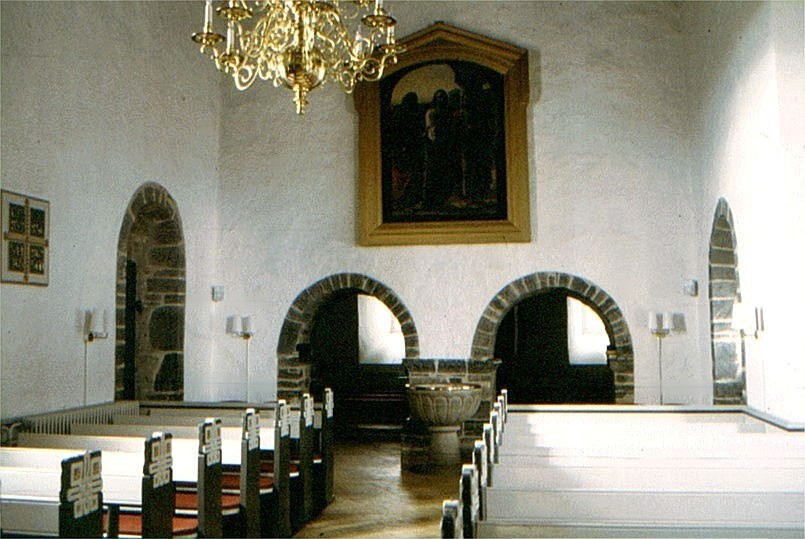
Nave and old font
