= Nordic round churches =

Style of church in Scandinavia

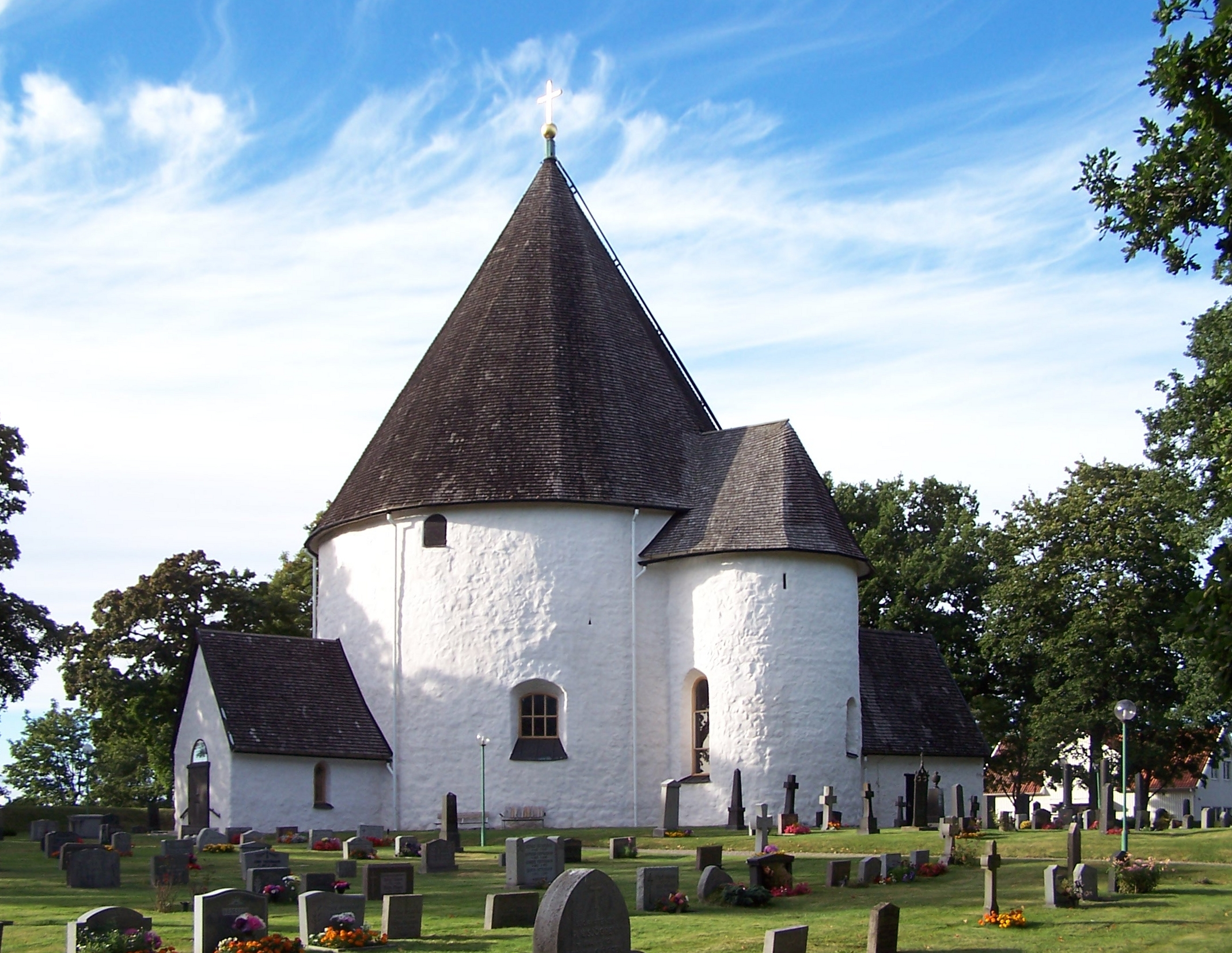
The round church in Hagby, Sweden

Nordic round churches are a type of round church found in Denmark, Sweden, and Norway.

== Function and architectural precedents ==
According to the usual interpretation, Nordic round churches were designed with defence in mind. Aside from their religious role, they also served as power symbols, storehouses and a safe place for community members to place their valuables during regional conflicts. Since stone buildings were still unusual in Scandinavia in the 12th century and there was not much experience of defending and attacking them, people in crisis areas often decided to build a single structure which combined the functions of a castle and a church, rather than two separate buildings. Even ordinary long churches were built such that the door could be barred from inside by very strong beams, which were inserted into deep holes on both sides of the door. Round churches also often had facilities which enabled the doors to be defended from above. In general, the round shape enabled defence, since it gave the defenders a better view of their surroundings and offered no blind spots for attackers to take advantage of.

Research connects round churches with the Church of the Holy Sepulchre in Jerusalem. The Church of Vårdsberg, for instance, contains a series of niches whose arrangement clearly parallels the Church of the Holy Sepulchre. This connection has a long history in Europe. Well-known structures which show similar influence from the Church of the Holy Sepulchre include the Basilica of San Vitale in Ravenna, the Haghia Sophia in Istanbul, and the Palatine Chapel of Charlemagne in Aachen. In addition to this, earlier round buildings in Europe, such as the Pantheon in Rome, were converted into church buildings. Archaeological investigations suggest the conclusion that a number of round churches were originally non-Christian sacred buildings converted into churches. Additionally, the round churches show strong German and West Slavic influence. German influence is most apparent in the round churches of Bornholm, while the Swedish churches show more signs of West Slavic influence. Signs of this influence as far afield as the Round church of Ophir on Orkney indicate an extraordinary cultural exchange at that time even over great distances.

== Denmark ==
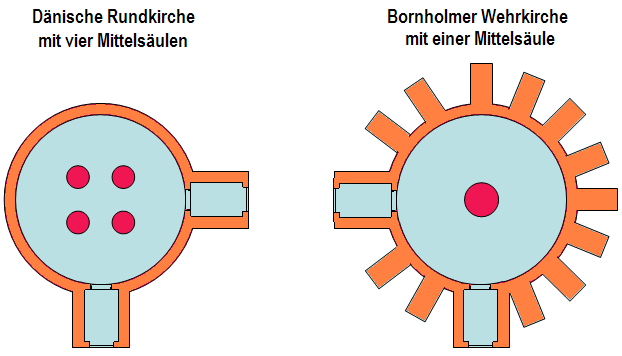
Plans of round churches with four central columns (Denmark), one central column (Bornholm)

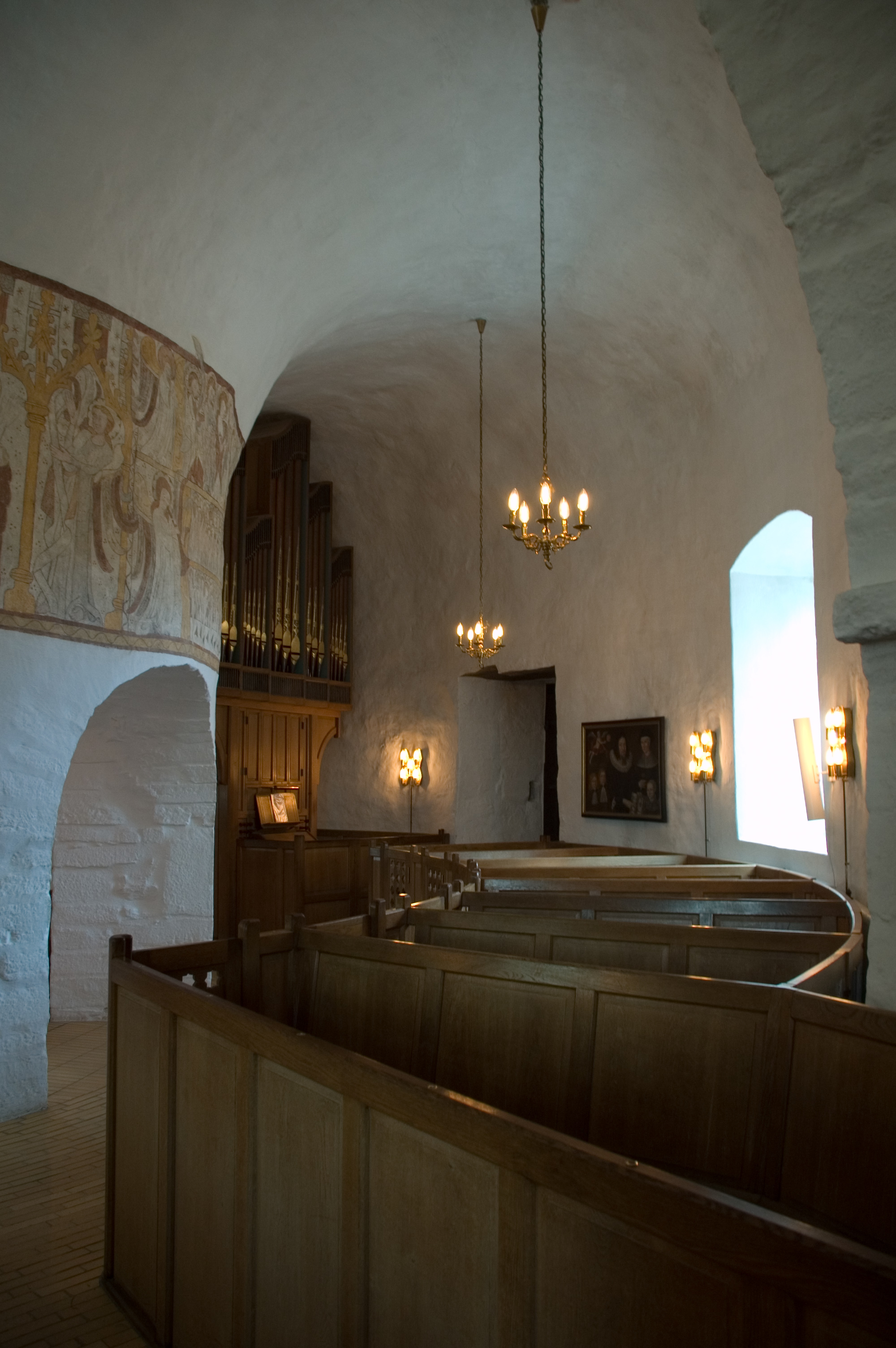
Interior of the round church of Østerlars

The best known surviving round churches of Denmark (Danish: rundkirke) are on the island of Bornholm. They were built in the twelfth century, but exact dates are not known. They have been modified repeatedly. Their significance lies in their fortress-like outer-walls with large buttresses, which bear the weight of a round barrel vault along with a central pillar. All the round churches of Bornholm, except for Ny Kirke, are fortified churches. The central pillar is often decorated with a painted frieze. Originally, the round churches had flat roofs with battlements (for defence). Their characteristic conical roofs were first added in the late Middle Ages. The weight of these roofs rests on the outer walls, making strong external supports necessary, which are especially distinctive on the church of Østerlars. The first three churches in the list below have three stories, the Ny Kirke has two stories. The upper stories are only accessible by narrow passages and served the local people as a refuge against pirate raids.

The other three Danish round churches are located in Jutland and on the islands of Funen and Zealand. They are united by their lack of strengthened outer walls. They have vaulted roofs which are supported by four central pillars and are referred to as "Absalon Round churches". The name derives from the archbishop Absalon of Lund, a member of the Zealand noble and ecclesiastical family of Hvide. All three structures have the same floor plan, which derives from the former round church of Schlamersdorf in Wagria. The former round church of Petersborg, north of Sorø in Zealand was also built on this model.

Round churches in Denmark

- Sankt Ols Kirke of Olsker - Bornholm
- Østerlars Church - Bornholm
- Nylars Church - Bornholm
- Ny Kirke - Bornholm
- Bjernede Church - Zealand
- Thorsager Church - Jutland
- Horne Church - Funen
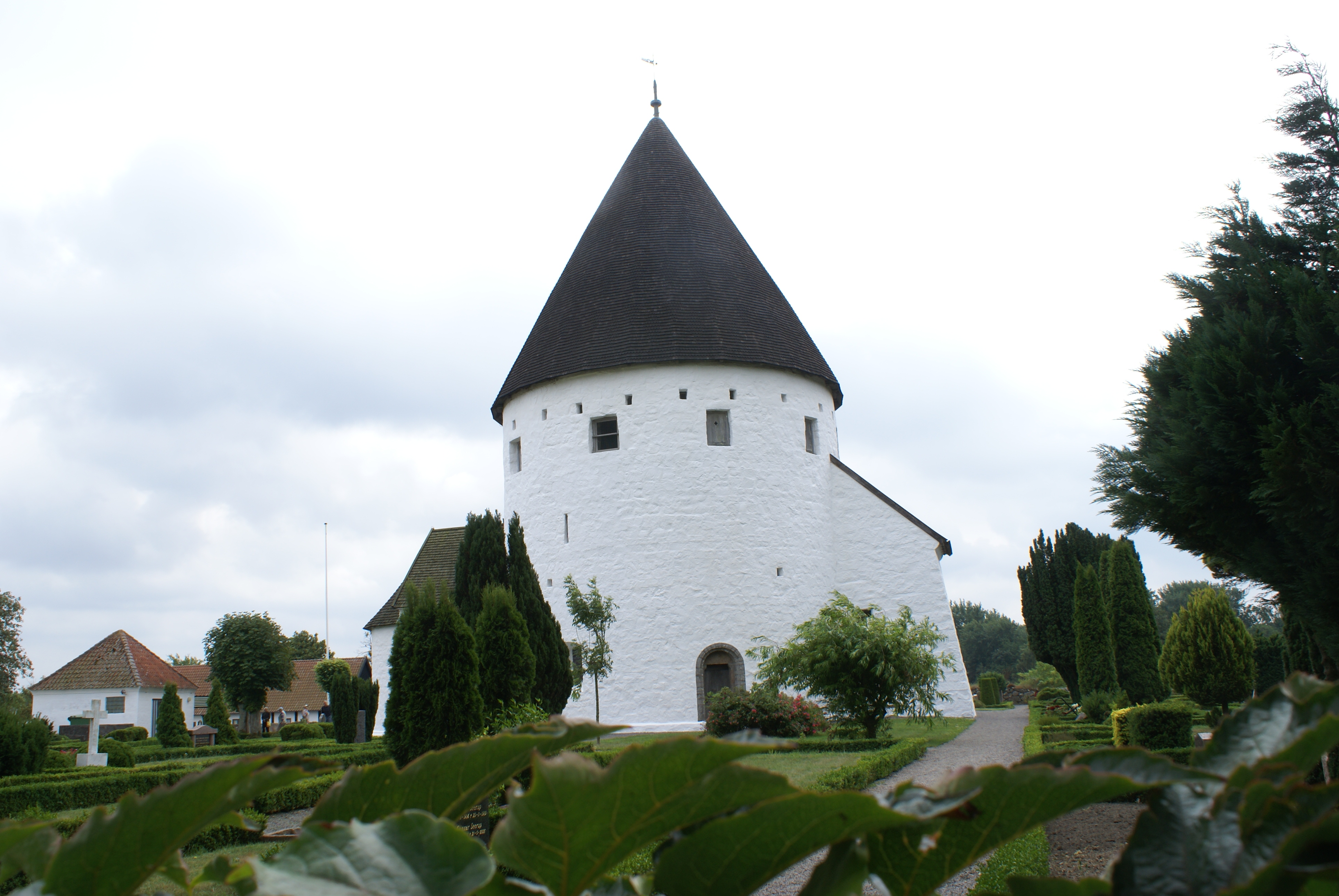
Saint Ols Church of Olsker, Bornholm

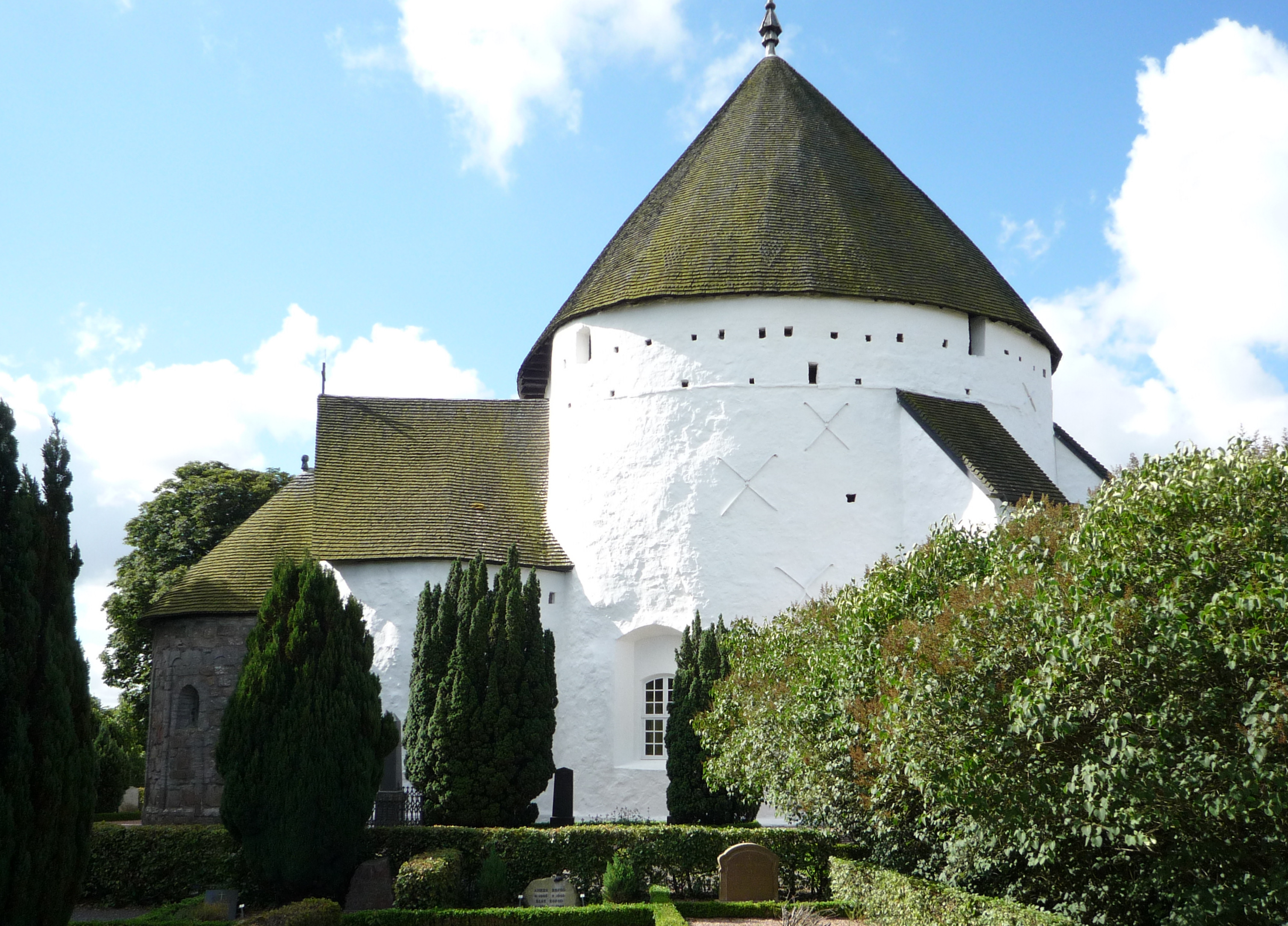
Østerlars Church, Bornholm

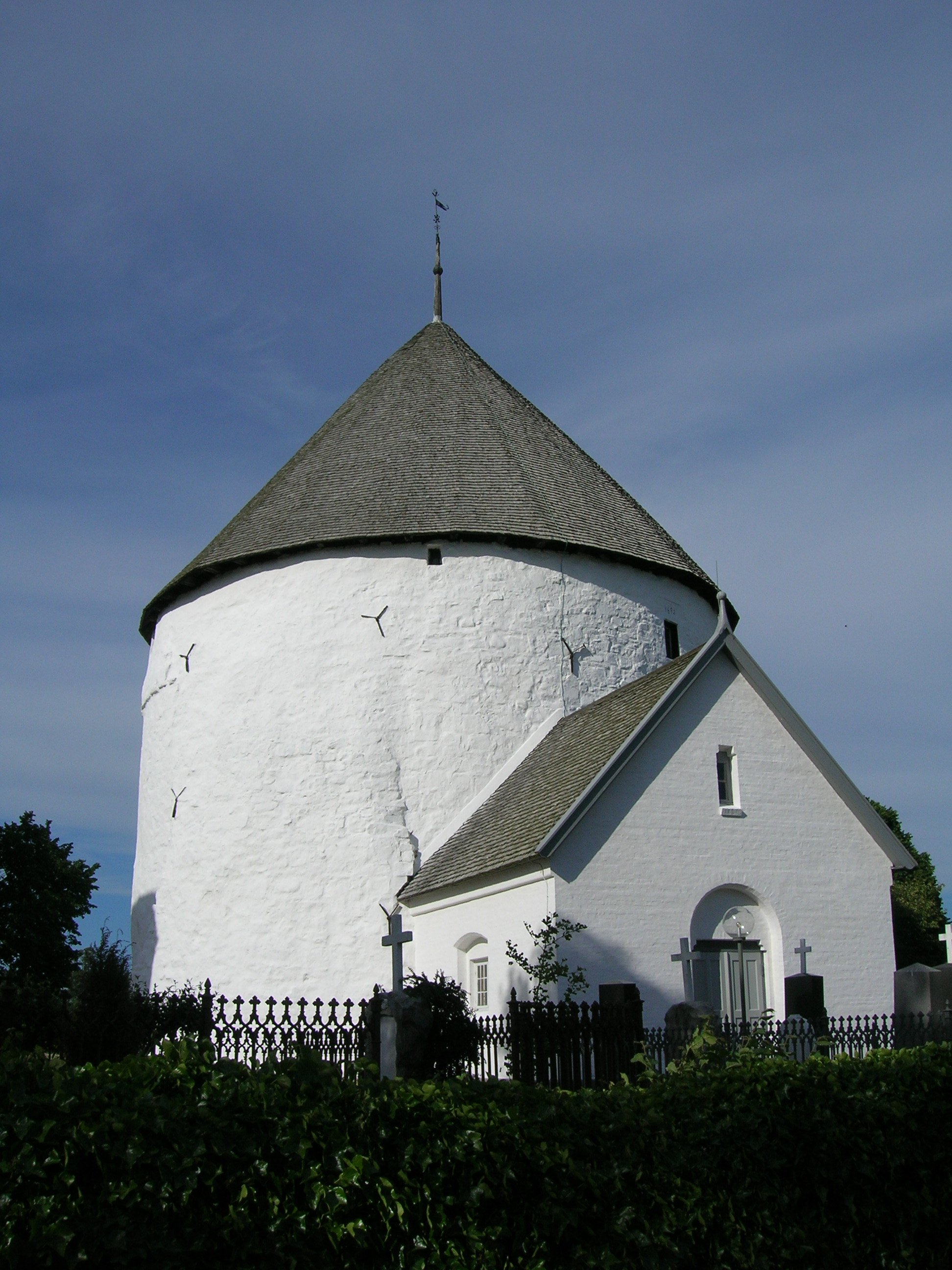
Nylars Church, Bornholm

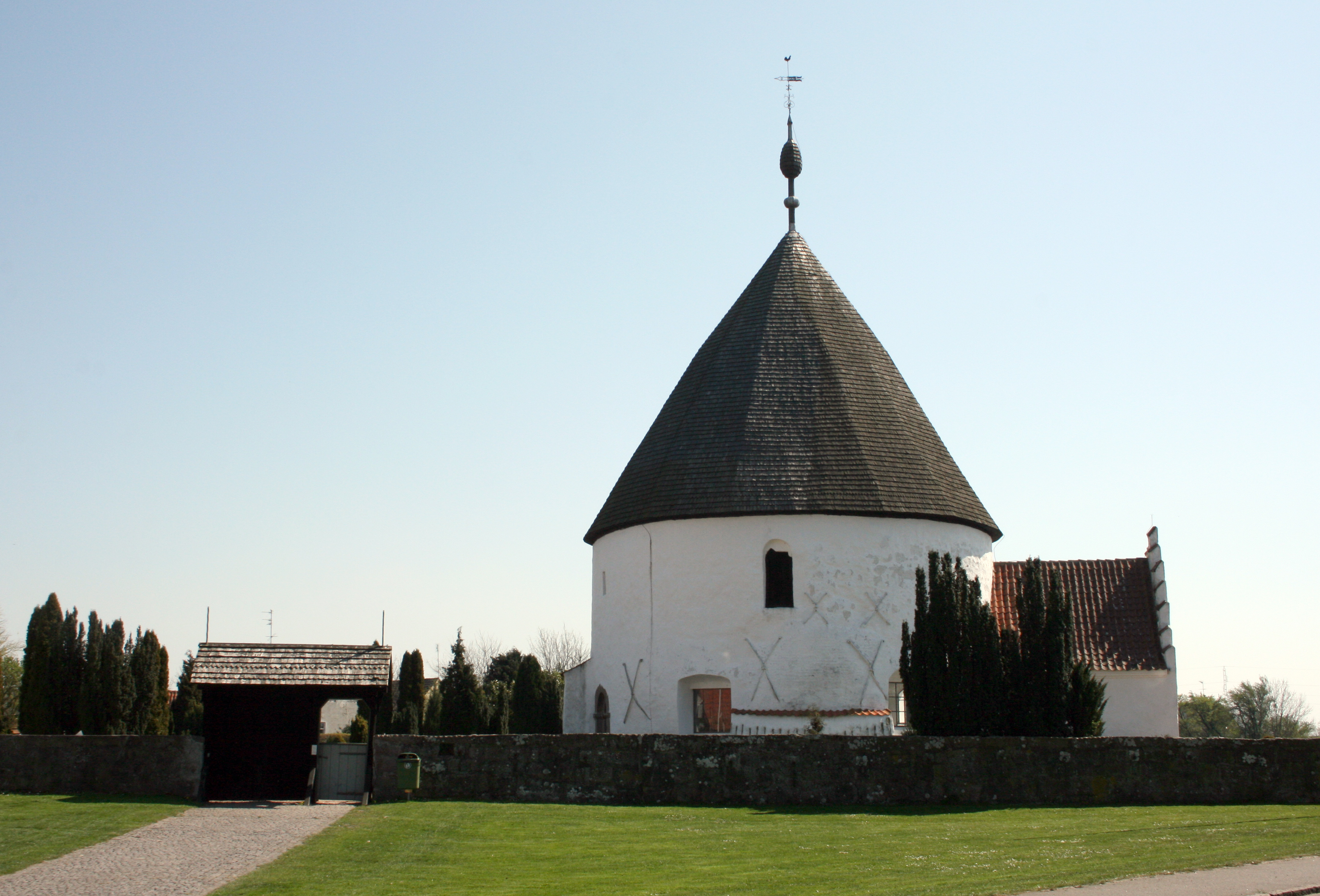
Ny Kirke, Bornholm

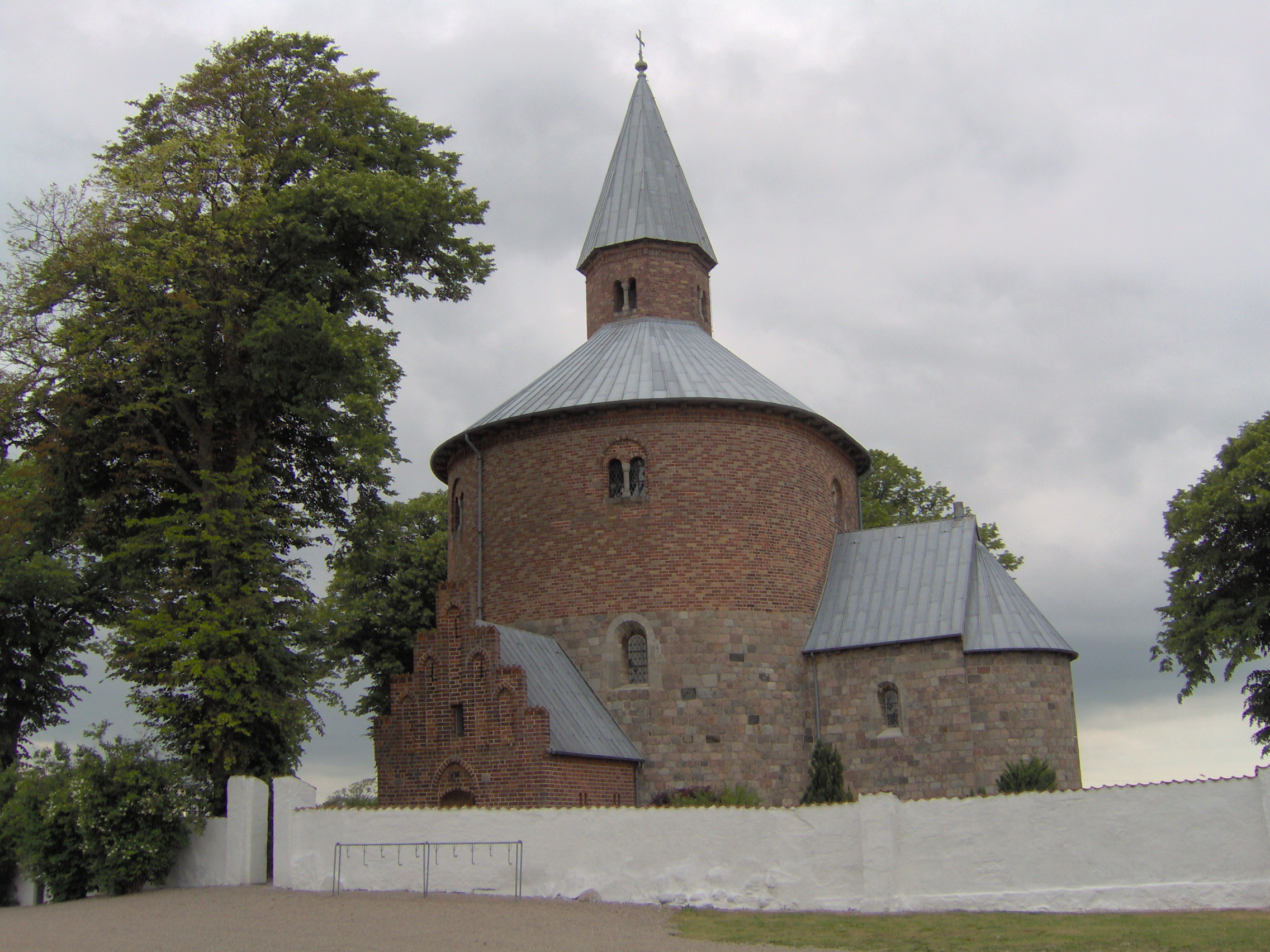
Bjernede Church, Zealand

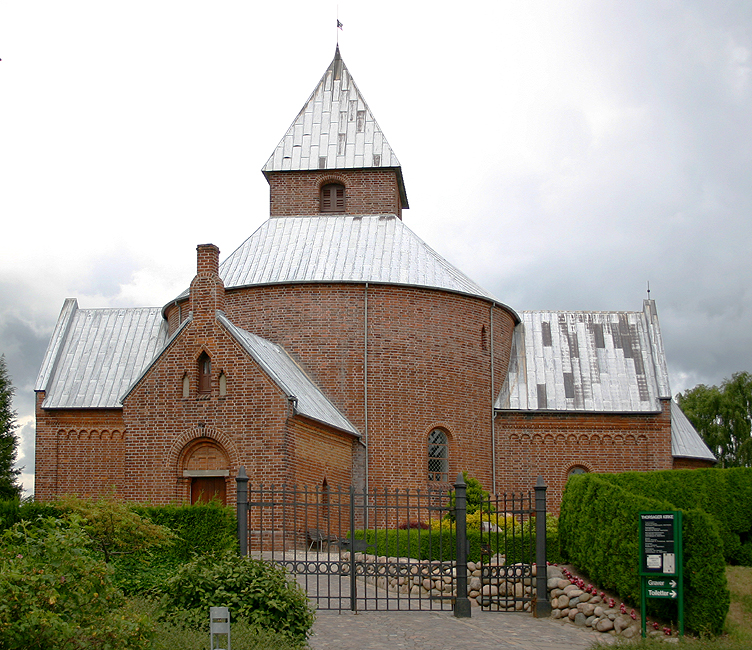
Thorsager Church, Jutland

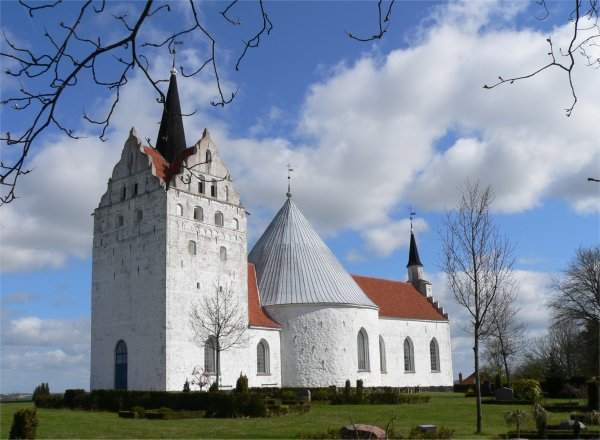
Horne Church, Funen

== Sweden ==
Only eight round churches (Swedish: rundkyrka) survive in Sweden. Ruins or foundations of another five exist some of which have been incorporated into subsequent buildings. These round churches are the oldest churches in Sweden and date to the twelfth and early thirteenth centuries. Some later churches in Sweden are modelled on the round church structure, such as Trinity Church in Karlskrona, as well as the Skeppsholmen Church and the Katarina Church in Stockholm. Interest in further archaeological investigation for churches in other sites has been aroused by the excavations of the ruins of Klosterstad.

The modern church for the Ethiopian Orthodox Tewahedo congregation in Hagsätra, Stockholm, has a circular nave tied to a rectangular service building. The circular part has an outer wall in rough red concrete, free of windows, that leans outwards to form a slice of an upside-down cone. Its flat roof is topped by a round copper-like metal dome.

Round churches in Sweden (Rundkyrkorna)

- Bromma Church - Stockholm County
- Solna Church - Stockholm County
- Munsö Church - Stockholm County
- Hagby Church - Kalmar County
- Voxtorp Church - Kalmar County
- Vårdsberg Church - Östergötland County
- Tjärstads Church - Östergötland County
- Valleberga Church - Skåne County
- Skörstorp Church - Västra Götaland County
- Round church of Helsingborg - Skåne County
- Church ruins of Agnestad - Västra Götaland County
- Church ruins of Klosterstad - Östergötland County
- Former Dimbo-Ottravad Church - Västra Götaland County

== Norway ==
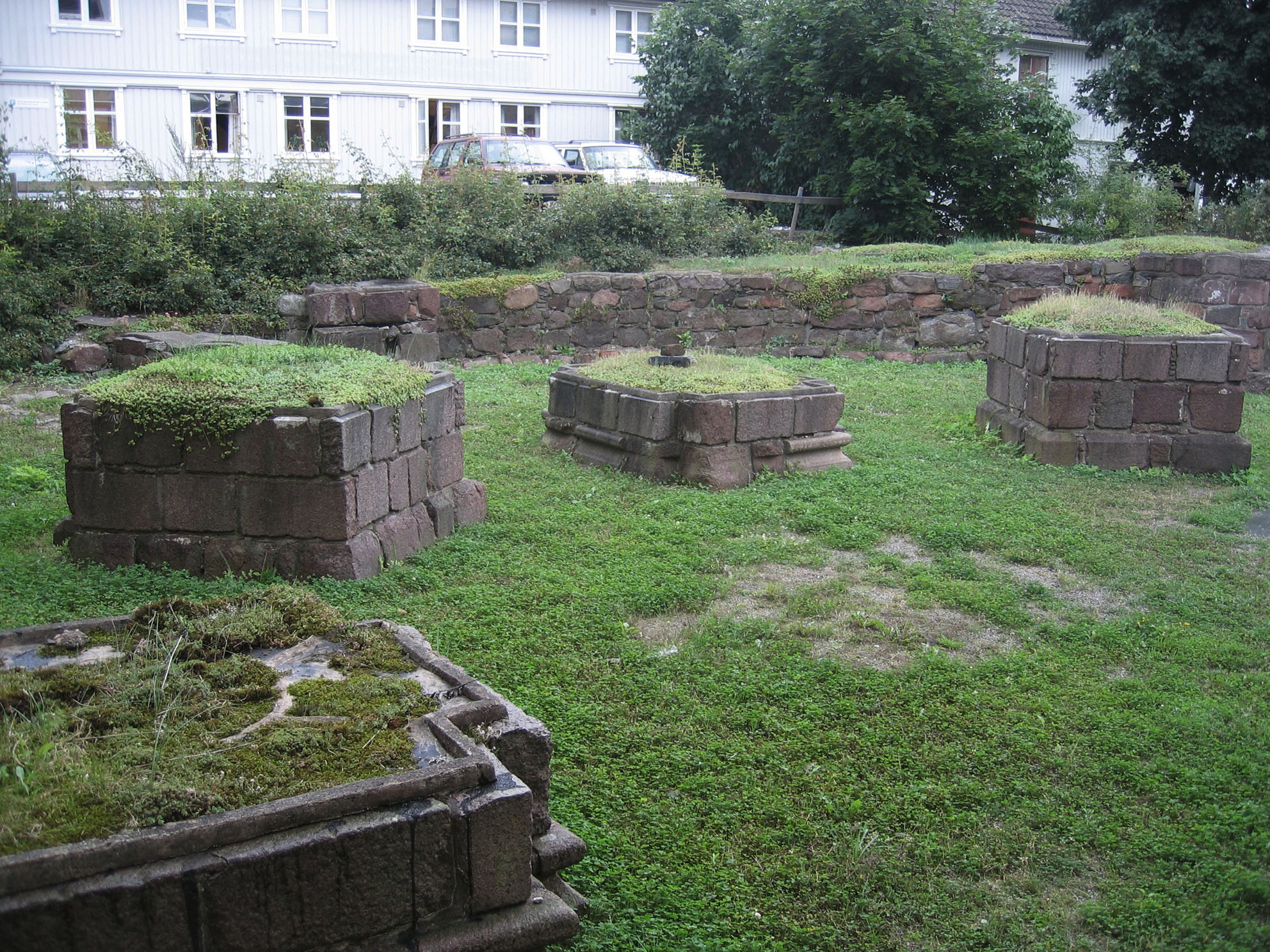
Tønsberg Olavskirken

The sole Norwegian round church (Norwegian: rundkirke) lies in ruins at Tønsberg, the oldest city in Norway. It was part of a medieval cloister of the Premonstratensians. Its construction began in the second half of the twelfth century and was completed in 1191. It was consecrated to St Olaf. The choice of a round church as the church of a cloister is unique. In addition, its outer walls were the largest of any round church in Scandinavia. An explanation of this size could be the importance of the cult of St Olaf, which still continues. Only a few years after its consecration in March 1207, king Erling Steinvegg was buried in the church. In 1536, four years after the secularisation of the cloister, the church burnt down. Some parts were able to be rebuilt and were subsequently used as the liege lord's residence.

Round churches in Norway

- St. Olav's Abbey, Tønsberg - Vestfold county

== See also ==
- Round-tower church

== Bibliography ==
- Ann Catherine Bonnier, Göran Hägg, Ingrid Sjöström: Svenska kyrkor. En historisk reseguide. Medströms bokförlag, Stockholm, 2008 ISBN 978-91-7329-015-9.
- Hugo F. Frölén: Nordens befästa rundkyrkor: en konst- och kulturhistorisk undersökning. Lars Frölén, Stockholm 1911
- Rikard Hedvall: "Kyrkorna i Klåstad." in Människors rum och människors möten: kulturhistoriska skisser. Berit Wallenbergs stiftelse, Stockholm 2007.
- Rikard Hedvall, Karin Lindeblad: Det medeltida Östergötland. En arkeologisk guidebok. Historiska Media, Lund 2007.
- Rikard Hedvall, Helmer Gustavson: Rundkyrkan i Klosterstad - en presentation av ett pågående projekt. Fornvännen årgång 1996 (PDF; 1,1 MB). Digital Fornvännen, Riksantikvarieämbetet, Vitterhetsakademiens bibliotek, Stockholm, 2001 pp. 145–152.
- Rikard Holmberg: "Ett skånskt spridningscentrum för bysantinska kulturimpulser." in Fornvännen årgång 1970 (PDF; 2,1 MB). Digital Fornvännen, Riksantikvarieämbetet, Vitterhetsakademiens bibliotek, Stockholm, 1970 pp. 120–135.
- Hermann Hinz: "Die ostskandinavischen Wehrkirchen." In: Chateau Gaillard: études de Castellologie médiévale. Université de Caen. Centre de recherches archéologiques médievales 1983, ISBN 2-902685-01-7.
- Friedrich Laske: Die Rundkirchen auf Bornholm und ihr mittelalterlicher Bilderschmuck. 2005, ISBN 3-9808983-8-5 (Reprint of the original edition of 1902)
- Peter Eriksson Lindskog: Försök till en korrt beskrifning om Skara Stift. 5 Volumes, 1812–1816 (1985 Reprint).
- Erik Lundberg: Östergötlands romanska landskyrkor. 1927
- Torsten Mårtensson: Borg och rundkyrka. Stockholm, 1936
- Jørgen Rasmussen: Thorsager Rundkirke - Gennem 800 År. Bog om kirkens historie og inventar. Thorsager menighedsråd, 1999
- Leif Törnquist: Svenska borgar och fästningar - En historisk reseguide. Värnamo, 2007
