= Round church =

Type of church construction

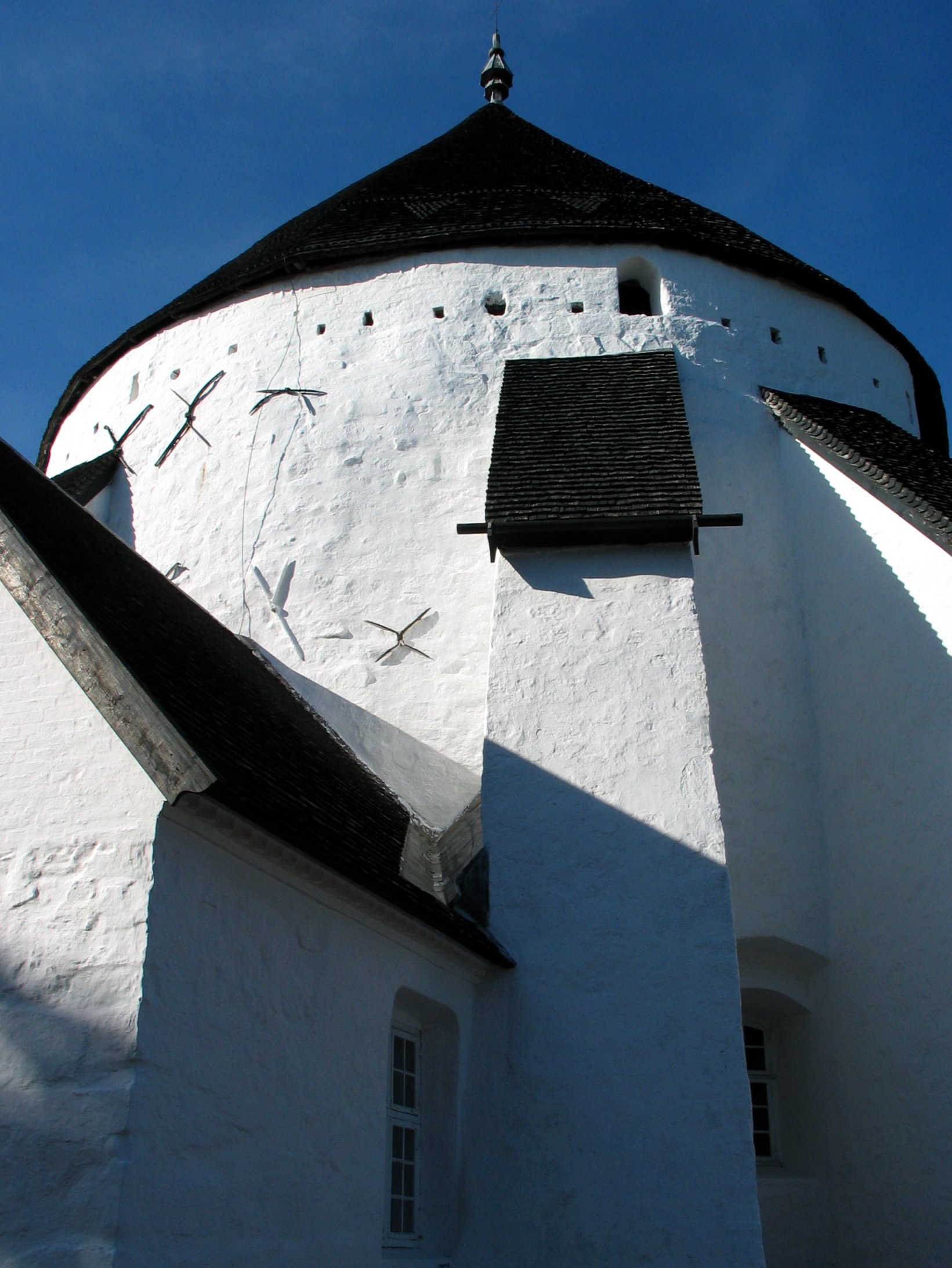
Østerlars Round Church, Bornholm, Denmark

A round church is a church with a completely circular plan, thus a rotunda in architectural terms.

There are many Nordic round churches in Sweden and Denmark (notably the island of Bornholm); round churches were popular in Scandinavia in the 11th and early 12th centuries.

Round churches should not be confused with the older types of round-tower church constructions. Churches with many-sided polygonal shapes (such as the 16-sided example in Richmond, Vermont, United States) are likewise colloquially referred to as 'round'.

== Round churches by country ==
=== Armenia ===
Zvartnots Cathedral in Vagharshapat (Etchmiadzin), often cited as the world's largest round church during its existence in the Middle Ages

=== Bosnia ===
Church of the Holy Transfiguration, Sarajevo

=== Brazil ===
Cathedral of Brasília

=== Bulgaria ===
Round Church, Preslav

=== Canada ===
- Our Lady of Victory Church, Inuvik
- St. Jude's Cathedral, Iqaluit
- Saint George's Round Church, Halifax

=== Croatia ===
- Church of Saint Vitus, Rijeka
- Church of Saint Donatus, Zadar

=== Czech Republic ===
- Rotunda of St. Catherine, Znojmo
- Rotunda of St. Peter and Paul, Budeč -the oldest, believed to have been built between 895-915.
- Rotunda of St. Peter and Paul, Starý Plzenec
- Rotunda of St. George and St. Vojtěch, Říp
- Rotunda of St. Martin, Vyšehrad(Prague)

This list is not complete. There are 29 surviving Romanesque rotundas or their torsos in the Czech Republic. All dating to the times of Great Moravia. There used to be at least 52, proven by archaeology or found in historical records.

=== Denmark ===
- Nyker Church, Bornholm
- Nylars Church, Bornholm
- Saint Ols Church, Bornholm
- Østerlars Church, Bornholm
- Bjernede Church, Zealand
- Horne Church, Funen (with later gothic extensions)
- Thorsager Church, Jutland

=== Ethiopia ===
- Ura Kidane Mehret Church, Lake Tana
- Narga Selassie Church, Lake Tana

=== France ===
Medieval churches of Saint-Bonnet-la-Rivière and Neuvy-Saint-Sépulchre, Baroque churches as Chapelle de l'Oratoire, Avignon and Vieille Charité church, Marseille, Abbaye St Croix in Quimperle.

=== Germany ===
Aachen Cathedral. Liebfrauenkirche in Trier. St. Ludwig in Darmstadt, Hessen. There is also a round church in Untersuhl, Thuringia.

=== Hungary ===
- Saint Anne Church, Kallósd
- Roman Catholic Church, Kiszombor
- Rotunda, Öskü
- St. Jacob Rotunda, Ják
- Neoclassical church, Balatonfüred (19th century)

=== Italy ===
- Church of Saint Stephen, Rome
- Church of Saint Bernard of Clairvaux, Rome
- Old Cathedral, Brescia
- Church of Saint Lawrence, Mantua
- Santo Stefano, Bologna
- Church of Saint Angelo, Perugia
- Church of Saint Marie, Forlì

=== Malta ===
- Sarria Church
- Rotunda of Mosta

=== Mexico ===
- Capilla del Pocito, an 18th-century Baroque chapel now part of the Basilica of Our Lady of Guadalupe complex in Mexico City

=== The Netherlands ===
- Ronde Lutherse Kerk

=== Norway ===
- St. Olav's Abbey, Tønsberg

=== Philippines ===
- Padre Pio Shrine, Santo Tomas, Batangas
- Church of the Holy Sacrifice in the campus of the University of the Philippines Diliman, Quezon City

=== Portugal ===
- Monastery of Serra do Pilar, a UNESCO World Heritage Site, Vila Nova de Gaia
- Church of the Convent of Christ, former headquarters of the Order of Christ and UNESCO World Heritage Site, Tomar
- Chapel of São Mamede, a 16th-century round chapel in the village of Jana, Sintra
- Church of Bom Jesus da Cruz, an 18th-century round church with greek cross interior located in Barcelos, district of Braga
- Basilica of the Holy Trinity, a minor basilica in the Sanctuary of Fátima in the city of Fátima

=== Serbia ===
- Church of Saint Anthony of Padua at Red Cross, Belgrade
- Church of Saint Basil of Ostrog, New Belgrade
- Evangelical church, Zemun

=== Spain ===
- Sant Gregori Taumaturg, Barcelona
- Iglesia San Marcos, Salamanca

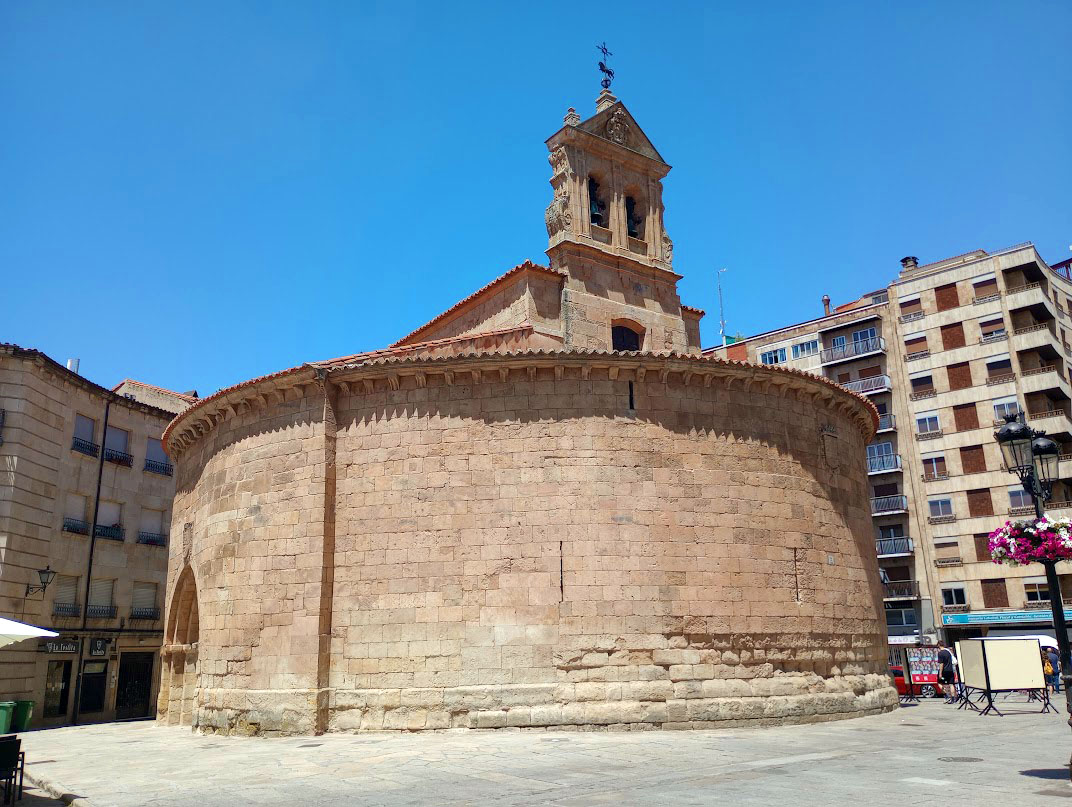
Church of San Marcos in Salamanca

=== Sweden ===
- Church ruins of Agnestad
- Bromma Church
- Ethiopian Orthodox Tewahedo Church, Stockholm
- Hagby Church
- Church ruins of Klosterstad
- Munsö Church
- Skörstorp Church
- Solna Church
- Tjärstads Church
- Valleberga Church
- Vårdsberg Church
- Voxtorp Church

=== United Kingdom ===
In England, there are four medieval round churches still in use: Holy Sepulchre, Cambridge; Temple Church, London; St John the Baptist Church, Little Maplestead, Essex, and The Holy Sepulchre, Northampton. St Chad's Church, Shrewsbury, is a Georgian round church, and the Liverpool Metropolitan Cathedral was built in the 20th century. The 18th-century All Saints' Church, Newcastle upon Tyne, is now part of the Evangelical Presbyterian Church in England and Wales.

In Scotland, the medieval Orphir Round Church near Houton on Mainland, Orkney, is in ruins. Kilarrow Parish Church at the top of main street in Bowmore is a round church, built in 1767, on the island of Islay, on Scotland's west coast.

== Gallery ==
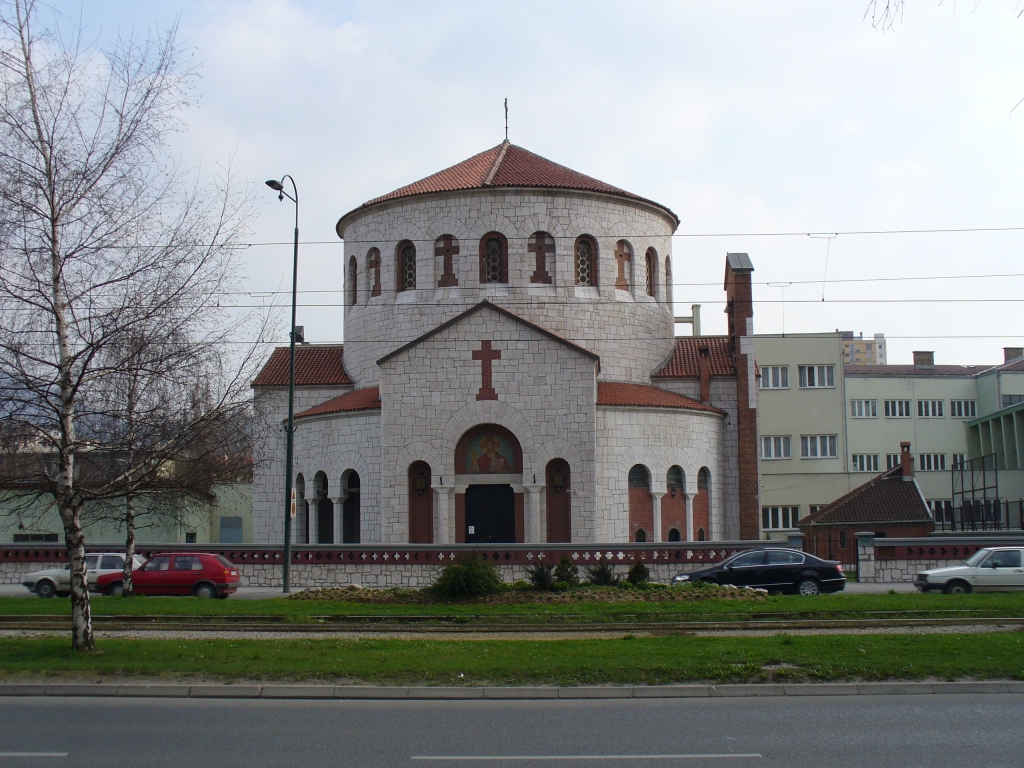
Church of the Holy Transfiguration, Sarajevo, Bosnia

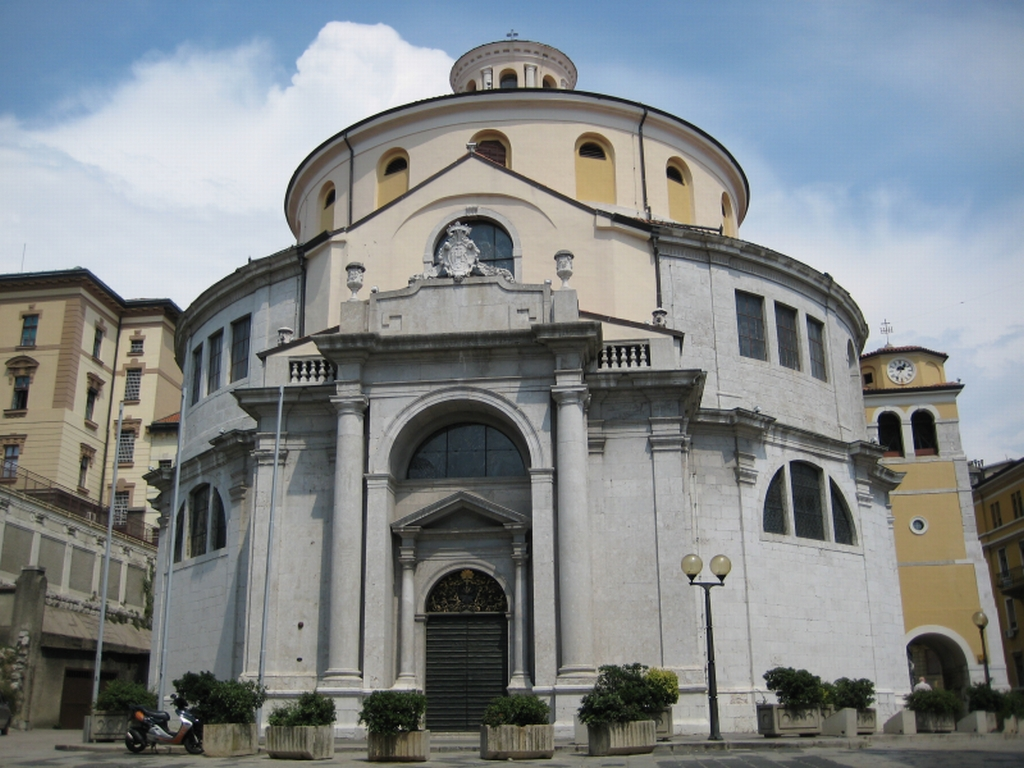
Church of Saint Vitus, Rijeka, Croatia

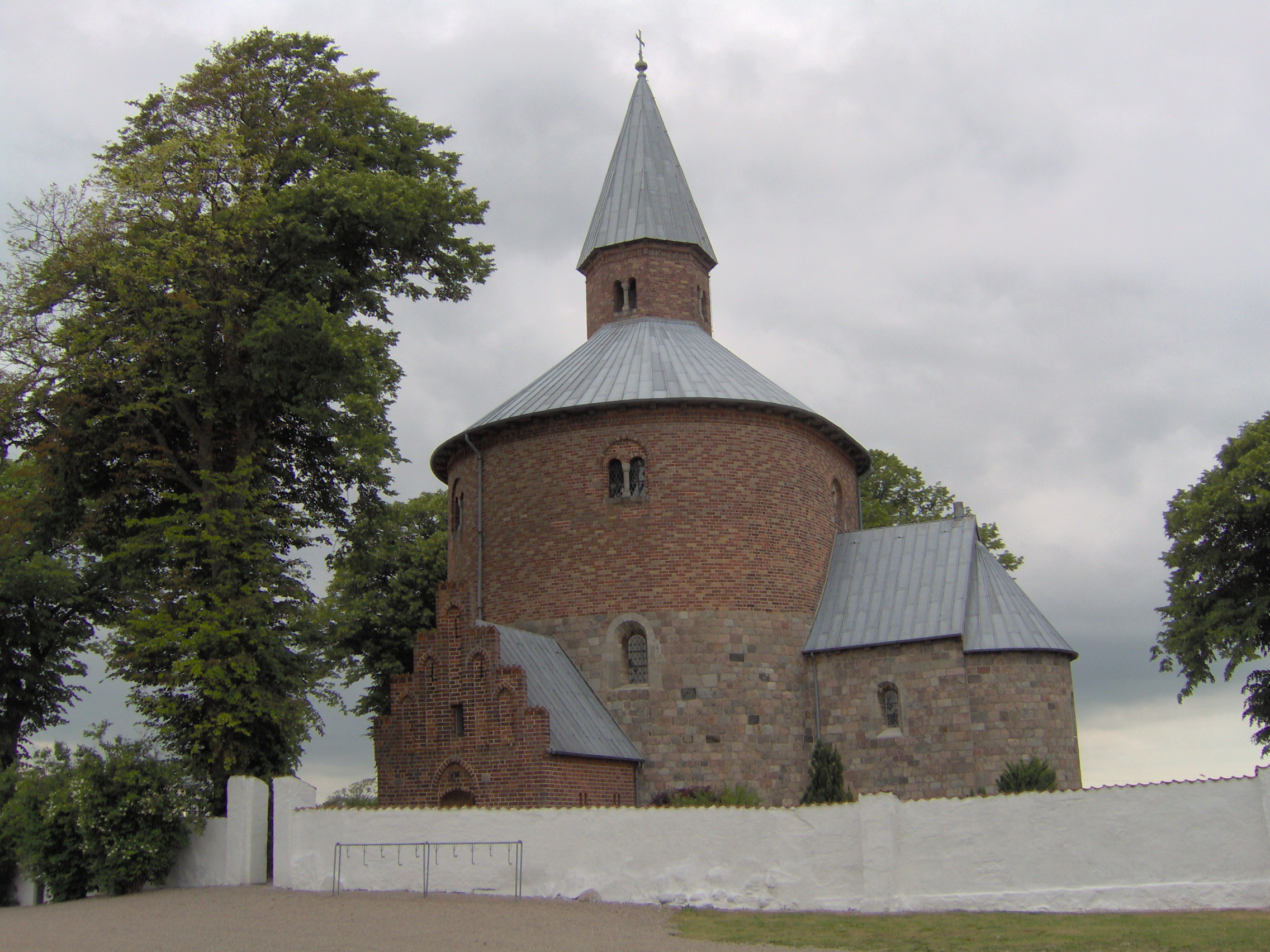
Bjernede Church near Sorø, Denmark

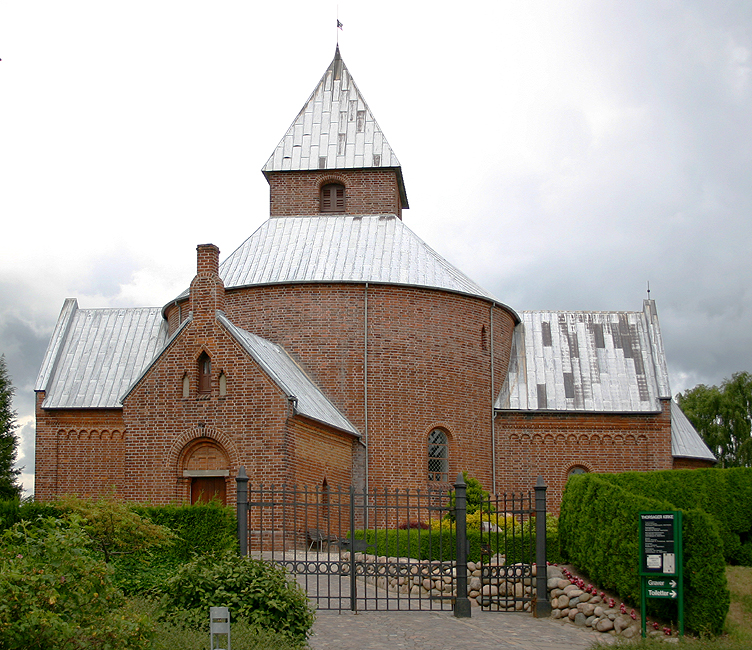
Thorsager Church, Thorsager, Denmark

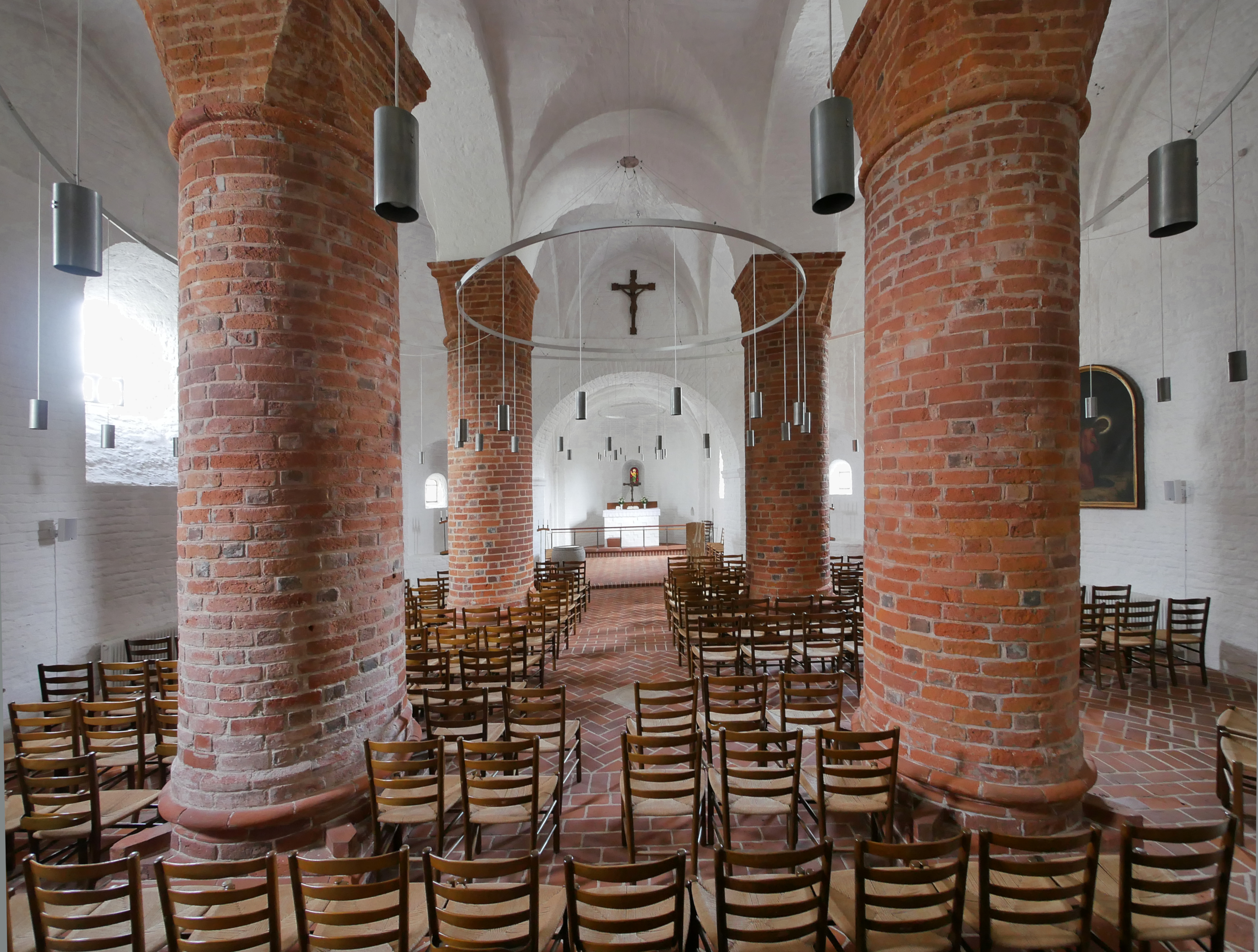
Thorsager church, interior

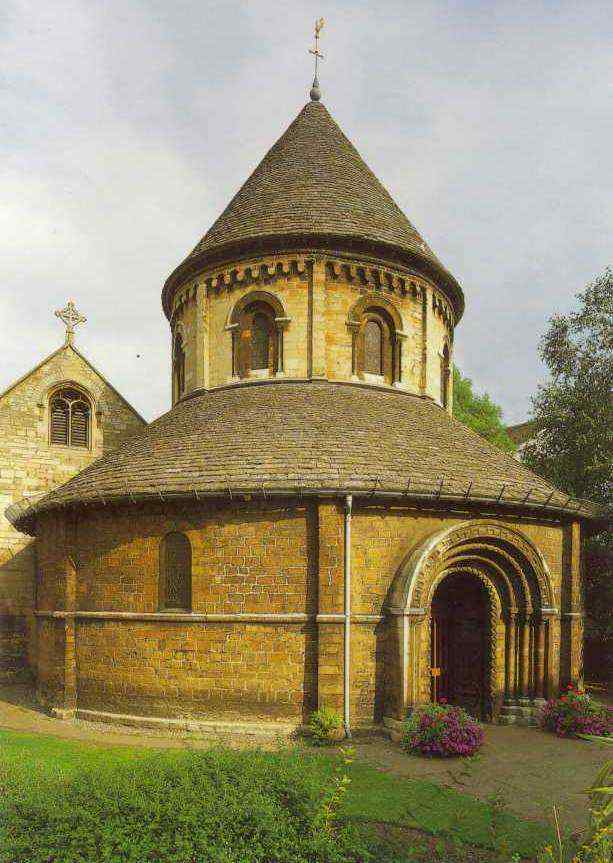
Holy Sepulchre, Cambridge, England

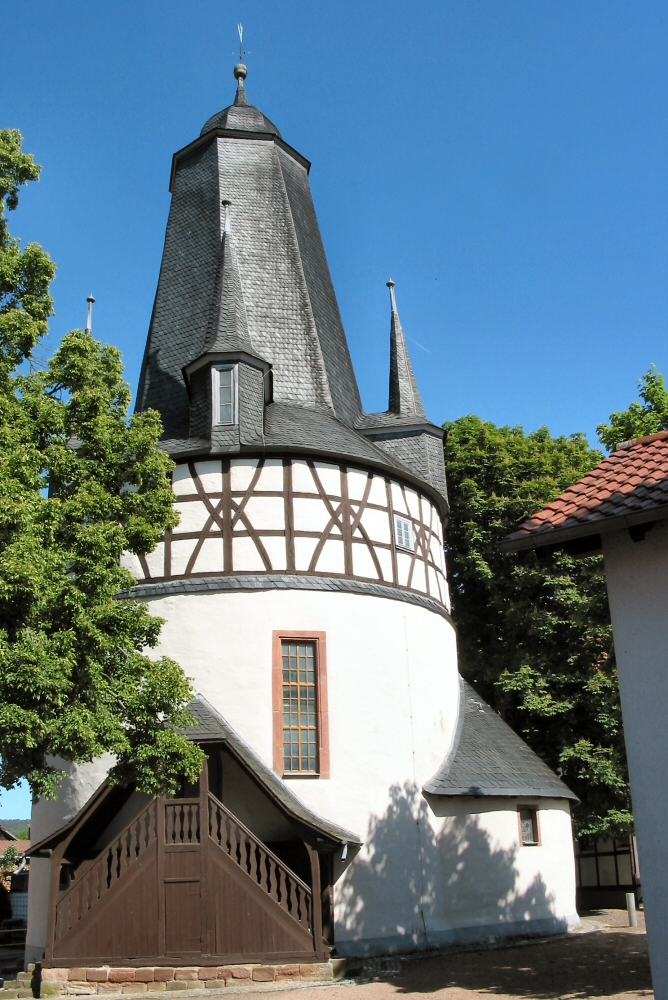
Untersuhl Church, Germany

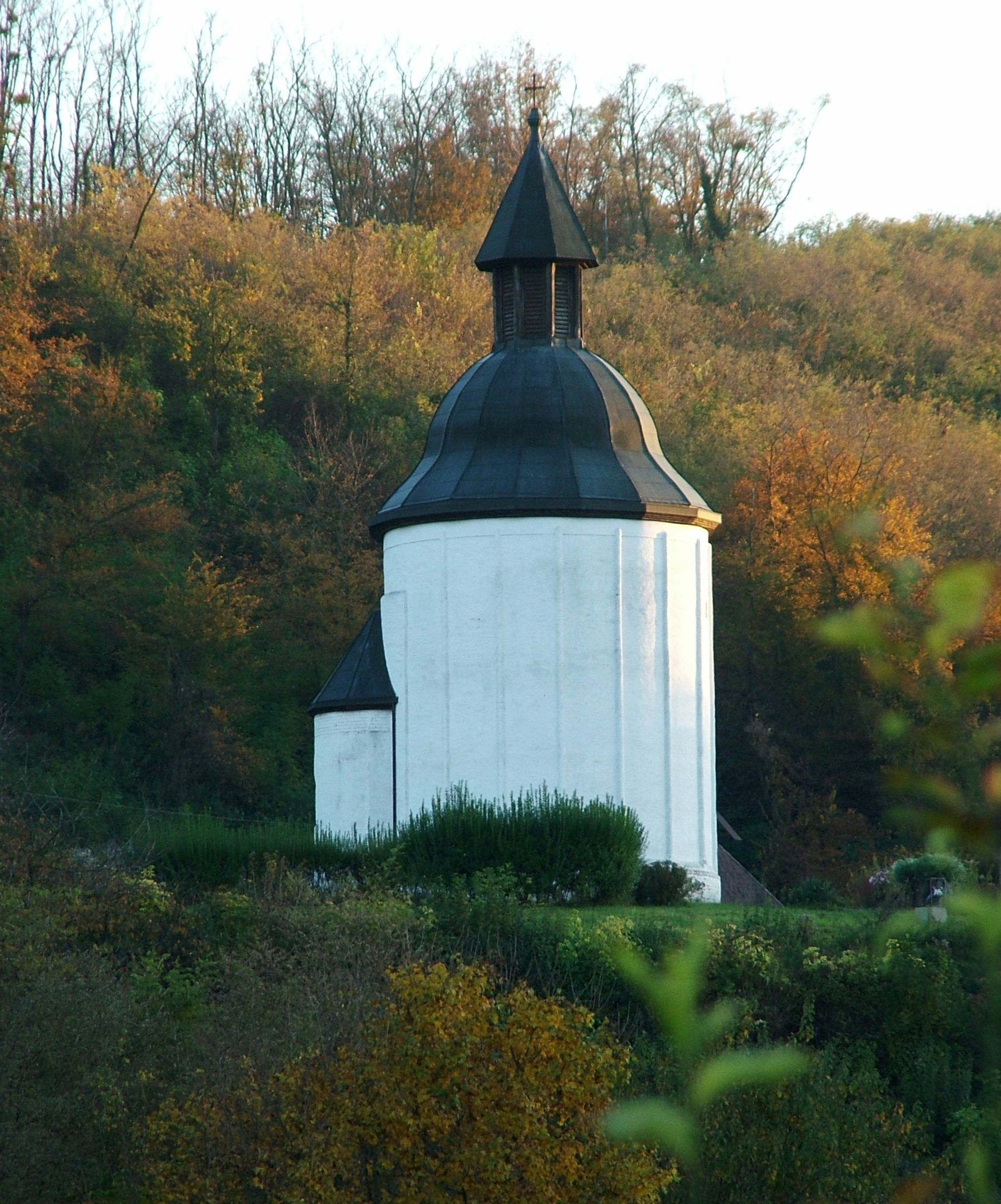
Saint Anne Church, Kallósd, Hungary

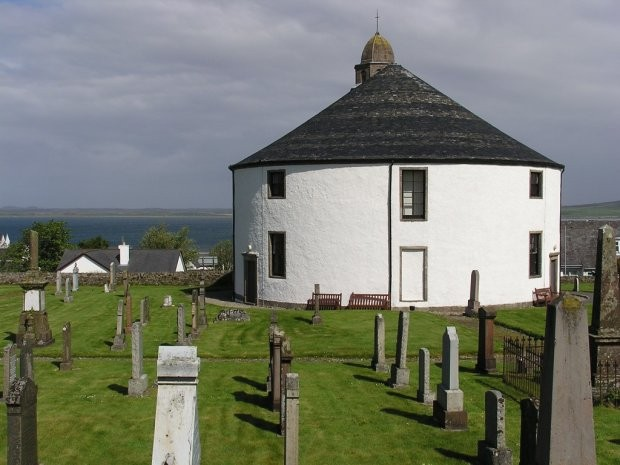
Bowmore Church, Islay, Scotland

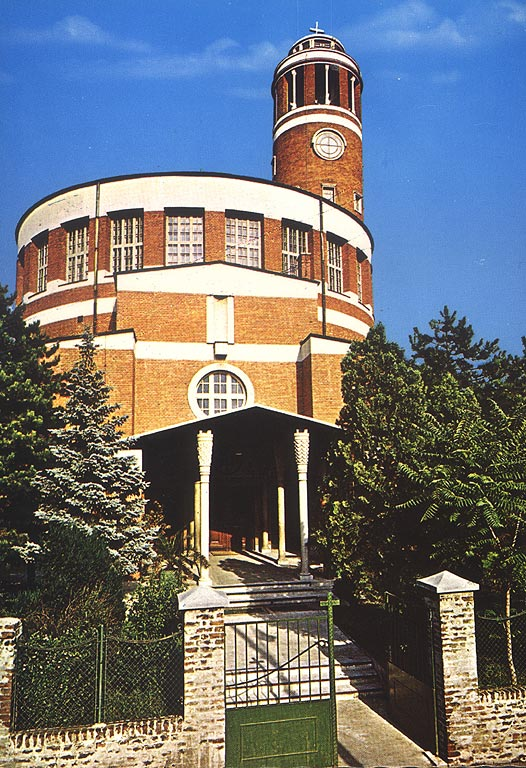
Church of St. Anthony of Padua, Belgrade, Serbia

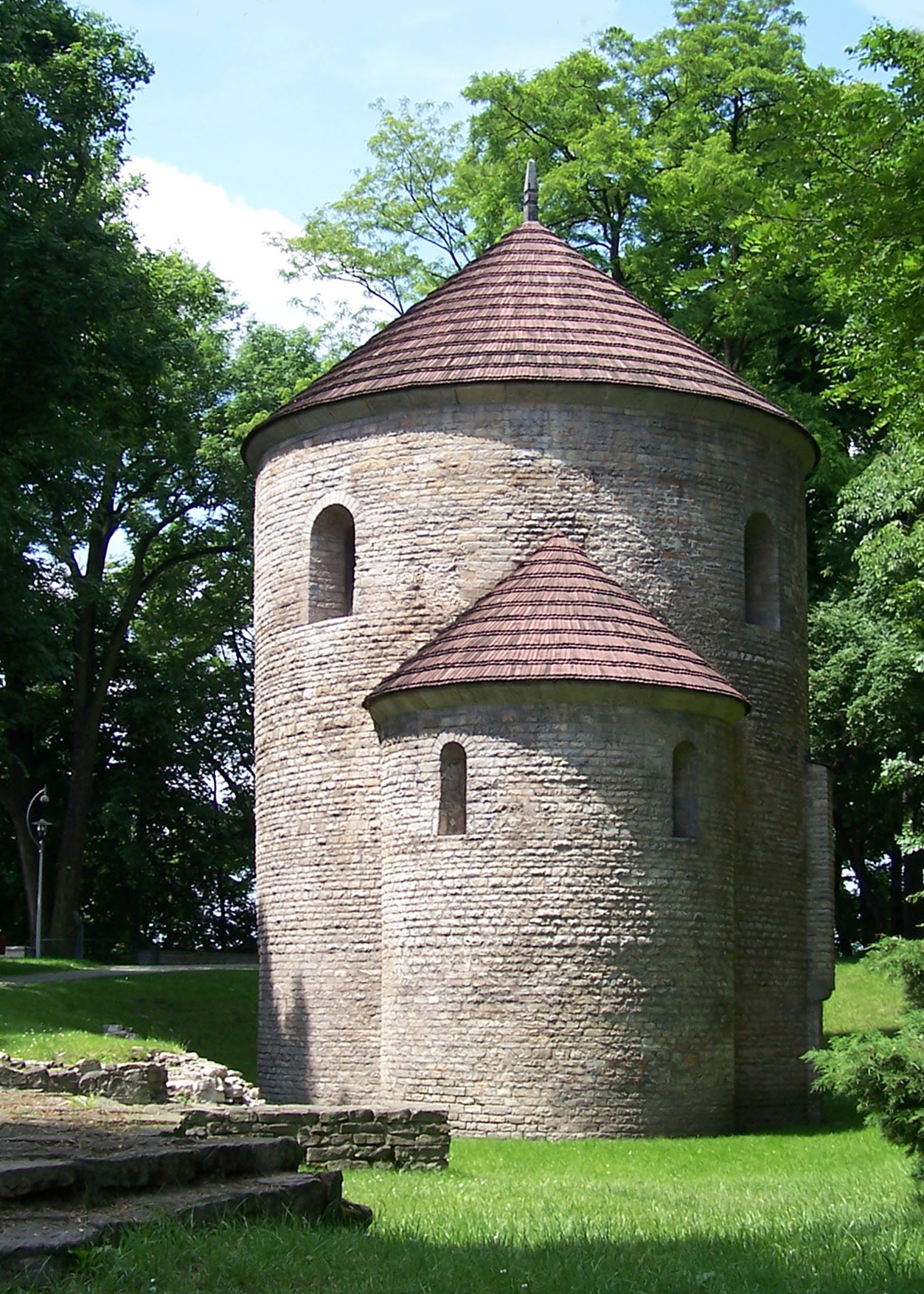
The rotunda of Saint Nicolas, Cieszyn, Poland

== See also ==
- Round-tower church
- Irish round tower
- Norra begravningsplatsen
