= Bromma Church =

Church in Sweden

Coordinates: 59°21′15.71″N 17°55′14.27″E

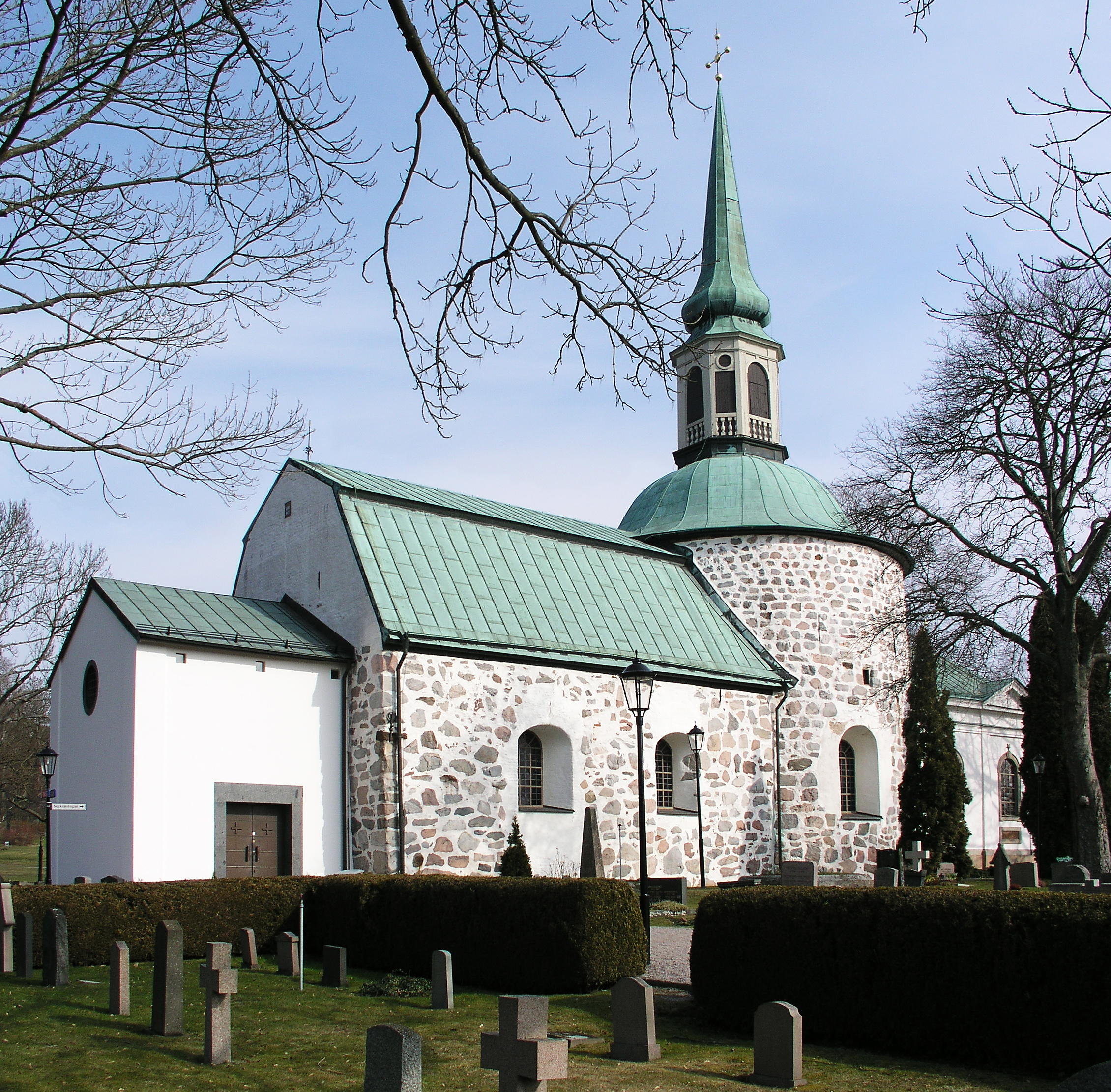
Bromma Church

Bromma Church is a round church in the borough Bromma in Stockholm, Sweden. It is the parish church of Bromma Parish in the Diocese of Stockholm. The oldest parts of the church were built in the late 12th century as a fortress church, and the church is among Stockholm's oldest buildings.

Today it has seven parts: roundhouse, nave, choir, sacristy, chancel tomb, weaponhouse and crypt.

== History ==
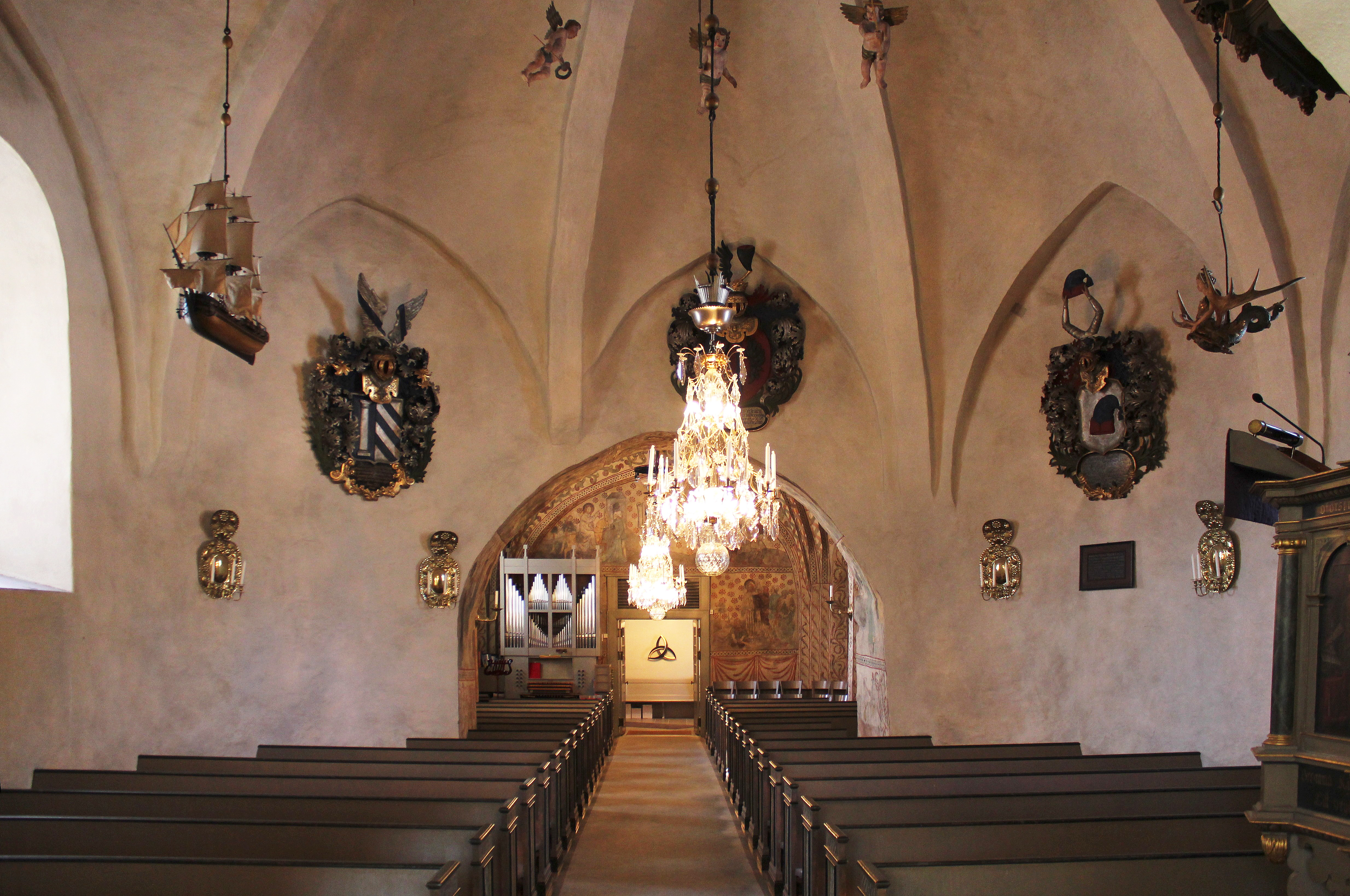
Bromma Church interior

Originally the church consisted of the round house and a choir on the east side. The nave and the sacristy were constructed in the mid 15th century, built in stone. In the 1480s Albertus Pictor or his pupils painted more than forty biblical church wall paintings, which were restored from overpaints by restorations in 1905–1906. The paintings' motifs are taken from both the Old and the New Testament. On the southern wall of the round house is a crucifix dating from the 15th century.

At the end of the 17th century several changes to the church were made by Johannes Vultejus, vicar from 1679 to 1700. The church's current roof, spire, pulpit and a wooden altar are from this period. The pulpit, dated from 1686, is a pentagon containing fields with paintings of Christ and the Four Evangelists. In 1703 a chancel tomb was constructed for the Hjärne family. The altarpiece is from 1818, surrounded by statues of Saint Peter and Paul, and the church also has some handsome epitaphs.

== Relation to other churches ==
Other Swedish round churches are Solna Church, Munsö Church, Voxtorp Church, Hagby Church, Valleberga Church, Skörstorp Church and Vårdsberg Church.

In 1901, Bromma Church was one of two churches designated control points for the first public orienteering competition ever held in Sweden.

Bromma Church was selected as Stockholm County's most beautiful church in a 2006 survey among listeners of a local radio station.

== See also ==
- List of churches in Stockholm
