= Church ruins of Agnestad =

Ruins in Västra Götaland, Sweden

Coordinates: 58°9′1.71″N 13°36′5.73″E

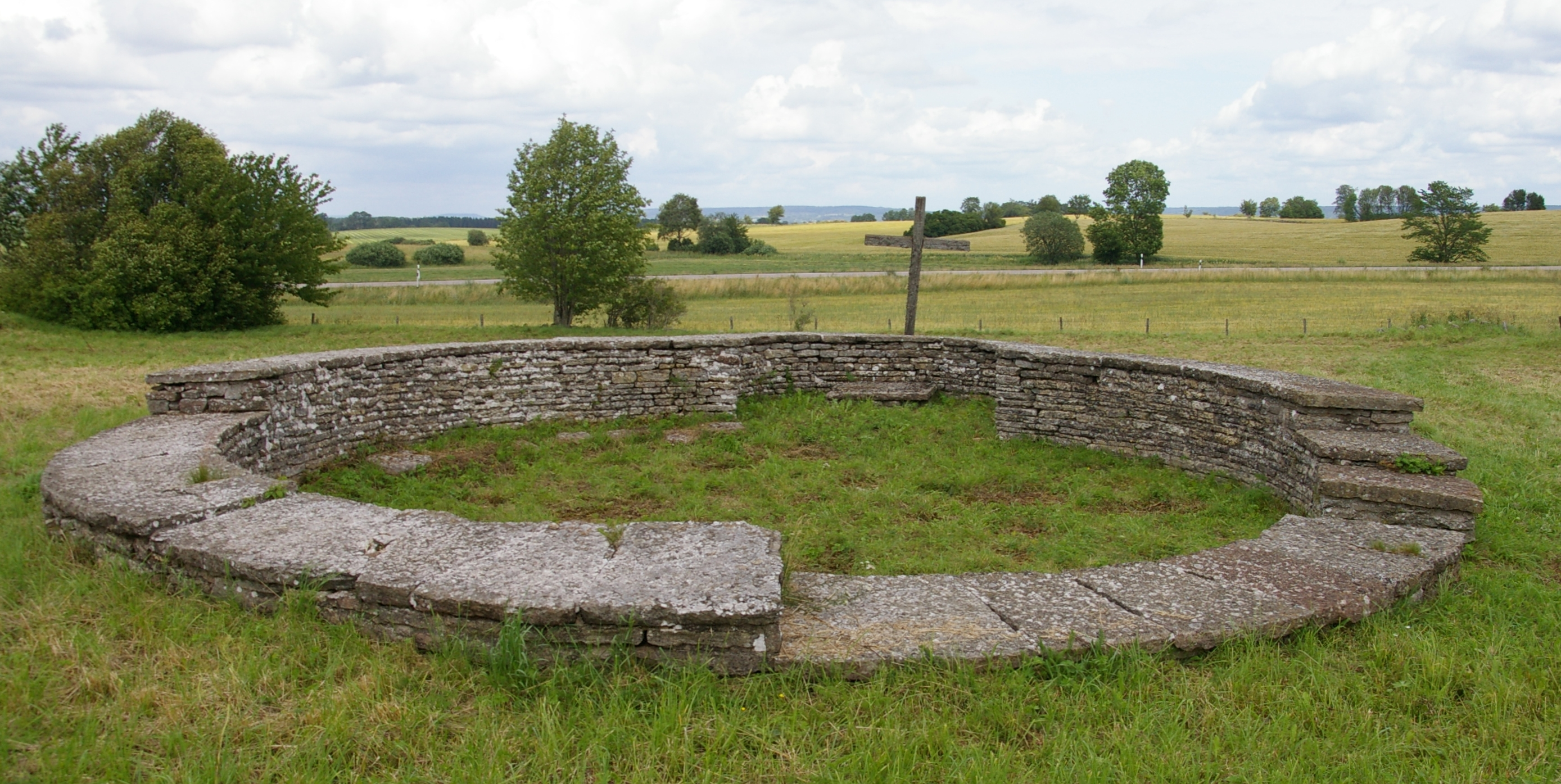
Foundations of the Church of Agnestad

The Church ruins of Agnestad are church ruins (Swedish: Ödekyrka) in Falköping parish in Västra Götaland, Sweden.

== Description ==
Only two ground level walls of this Medieval church survive to this day. The remains of the foundations show that the floor plan was that of a round church (Swedish: rundkyrka). Its round central room had a diameter of about seven metres and the walls were 1.1 metres thick. In the east, there was a rectangular apse, which probably housed the altar. The church was surrounded by an old church square, paved with flat stones. The ruins are located to the north of the Ålleberg castle and southeast of Falköping. On account of the church's small size, it is assumed that the congregation were accustomed to stand during services.

== History ==
The church was built in the second half of the twelfth century. Like the Skörstorp Church and the Dimbo-Ottravad Church, it was commissioned by the Bishop of Skara, Bengt I the Good. According to other sources, it was established by Saint Sigfrid of Sweden. Both Bengt and Sigfrid were bishops of Skara. The establishment of the Östra Gerum Church some ten kilometres to the east and the Friggeråker Church about four kilometres to the north is also ascribed to Sigfrid.

Archaeological excavations revealed the remains of early Christian stone graves from the 11th century. The results of this ork indicate that a wooden church must have already stood on this site before the stone one. In the second half of the 16th century the church was abandoned.
