= Kallósd =

Coordinates: 46°52′N 17°04′E

- Village
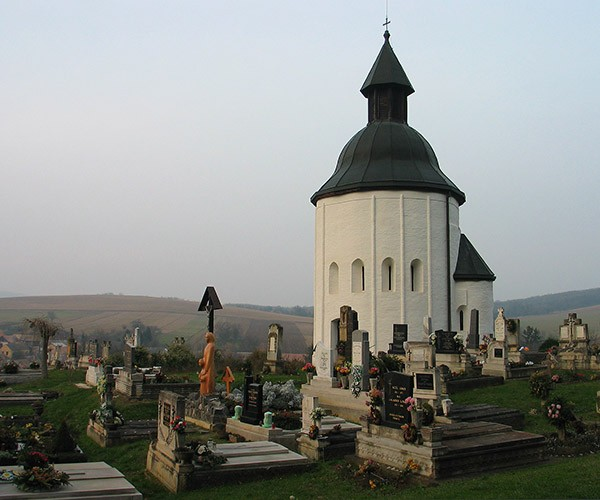
- Kallosdi-kerek-templom

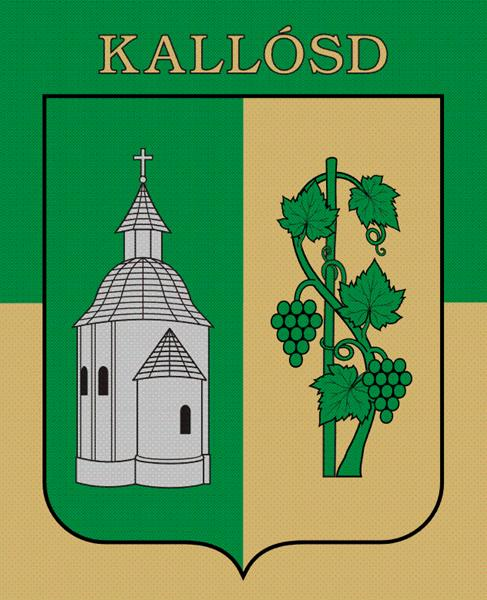
- Seal
- Interactive map of Kallósd
- Country: Hungary
- Region: Western Transdanubia
- County: Zala County
- Time zone: UTC+1 (CET)
  - Summer (DST): UTC+2 (CEST)

Kallósd is a village in Zala County, Hungary. It is the site of the Saint Anne Round Church in Kallósd.
