= Saint Anne Round Church in Kallósd =

Church in Kallosd, Hungary

Coordinates: 46°52′17″N 17°03′48″E

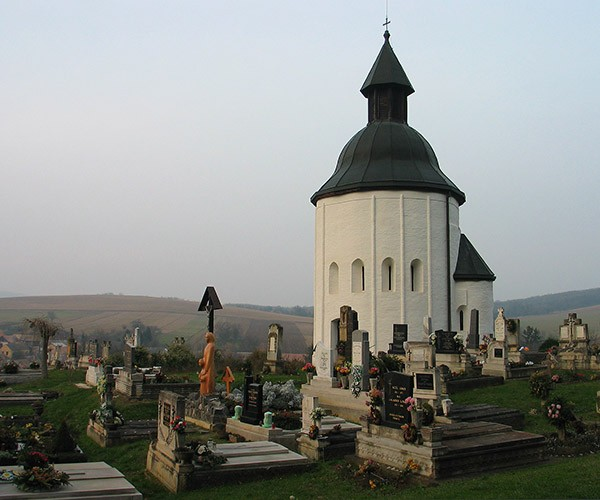
Saint Anne Round Church

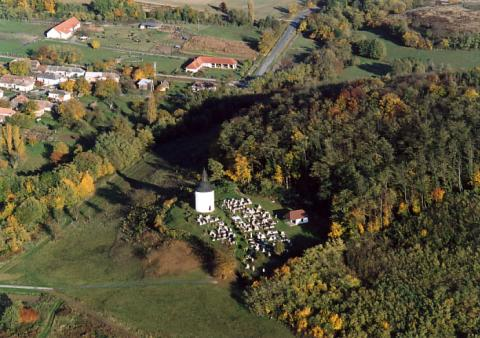
Aerial photo of the Saint Anne Church

Being one of the few round churches from the Árpád Age, the Saint Anne Church in Kallósd is listed among the most significant monuments of Hungary. Every year several tourists visit the church and the little village of less than a hundred inhabitants in one of the side valleys of River Zala.

== History ==
The territory of Kallósd used to be a royal estate belonging to Zalavár. The king offered it to the sons of Orosz from Komár only after 1203. His grandson, Miklós, son of Karacs built the parish church around 1260. From the 14th century it belonged to the Abbey of Kapornak. The inhabitants of the village were forced to leave the church by reason of the Turkish expansion in the 17th century. The population returned in 1711. They started to clean the thicket around the church and renovated the building in 1740. Because of the growing number of inhabitants they had to build a hallway to the church in the 19th century which was demolished during the renovation between 1989 and 1993 in order to preserve the round church in its original shape.

== The building ==
The Romanesque church has brick walls on its stone base and a conical roof structure. An apse is set into the east end of the building. There are semicircular windows on the sides of the entrance on the south-western side. The ancient round base, the entablature, the apse and the cupola all refer to Romanesque architecture in the middle of the 13th century.

== The role of the round church today ==
In the 1990s a new church has been raised on the side of the bell tower in the middle of the village. Nowadays regular church services take place there. The nearly 800-year-old church in the cemetery hosts the summer concerts in July and August. The symbol of Kallósd also appears on the blazon of the village.

== Feasts ==
- Saint's Day: 26 July
