= Valleberga Church =

Church in Valleberga, Sweden

Coordinates: 55°25′43.4″N 14°3′45″E

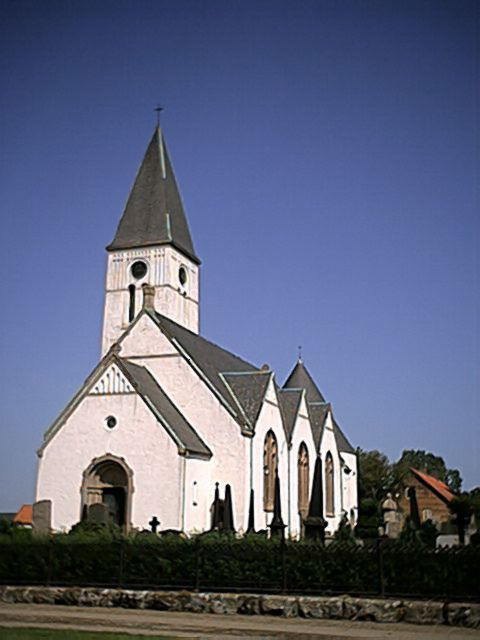
Valleberga Church

Valleberga Church is a church in the village of Valleberga, Sweden. It is situated about 15 miles east of Ystad in Skåne County. It is in the parish of Löderup of the Diocese of Lund.

== History ==
It was built of limestone in the middle of the 12th century. It is the only known fortified round church in Skåne. Master mason of the church, Carl stenmästare, also built churches on Bornholm, where round churches were common. The baptismal font was cut by the Romanesque artist known today as Majestatis and shows one of the legends about Saint Peter and Paul of Tarsus. The pulpit was made in 1619. The altar cabinet dates to the beginning of the 16th century.

In 1791, the round church was considerably altered when extensions were made to the north, west and south. These extensions were demolished in 1908–1910 when the round church was restored and a large cathedral-like extension was made to the west, including a new tower.

== Gallery ==
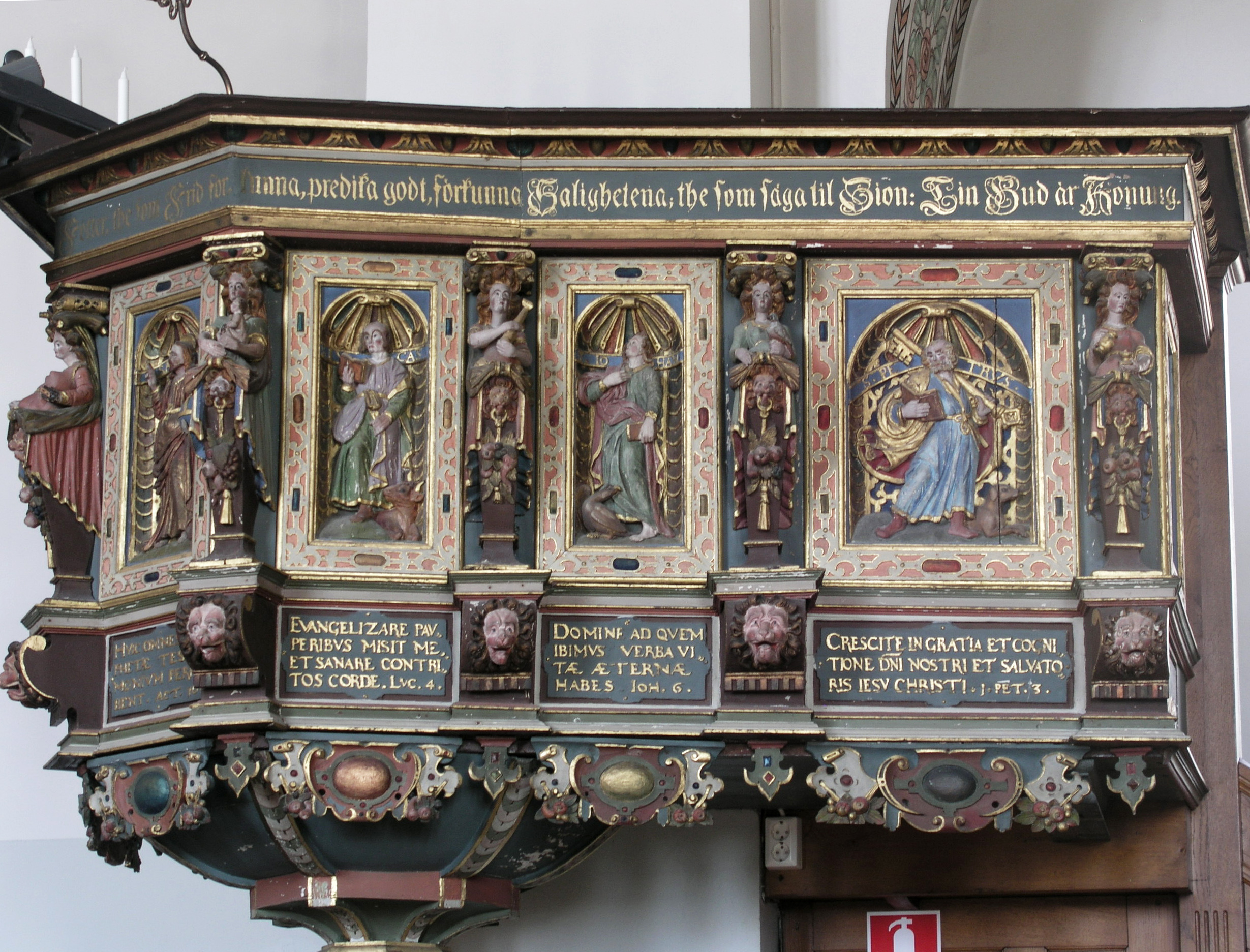
Pulpit

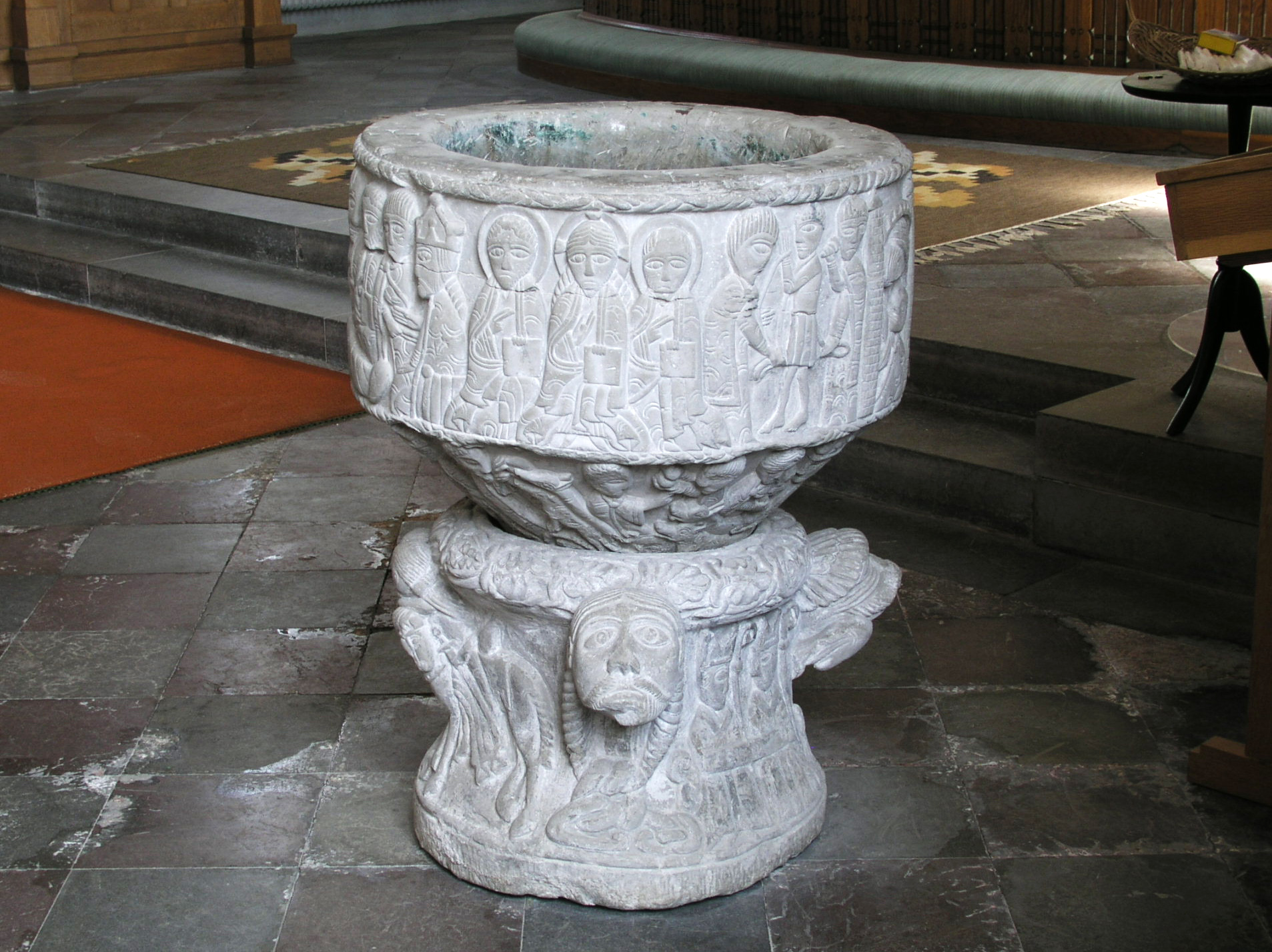
Baptismal Font

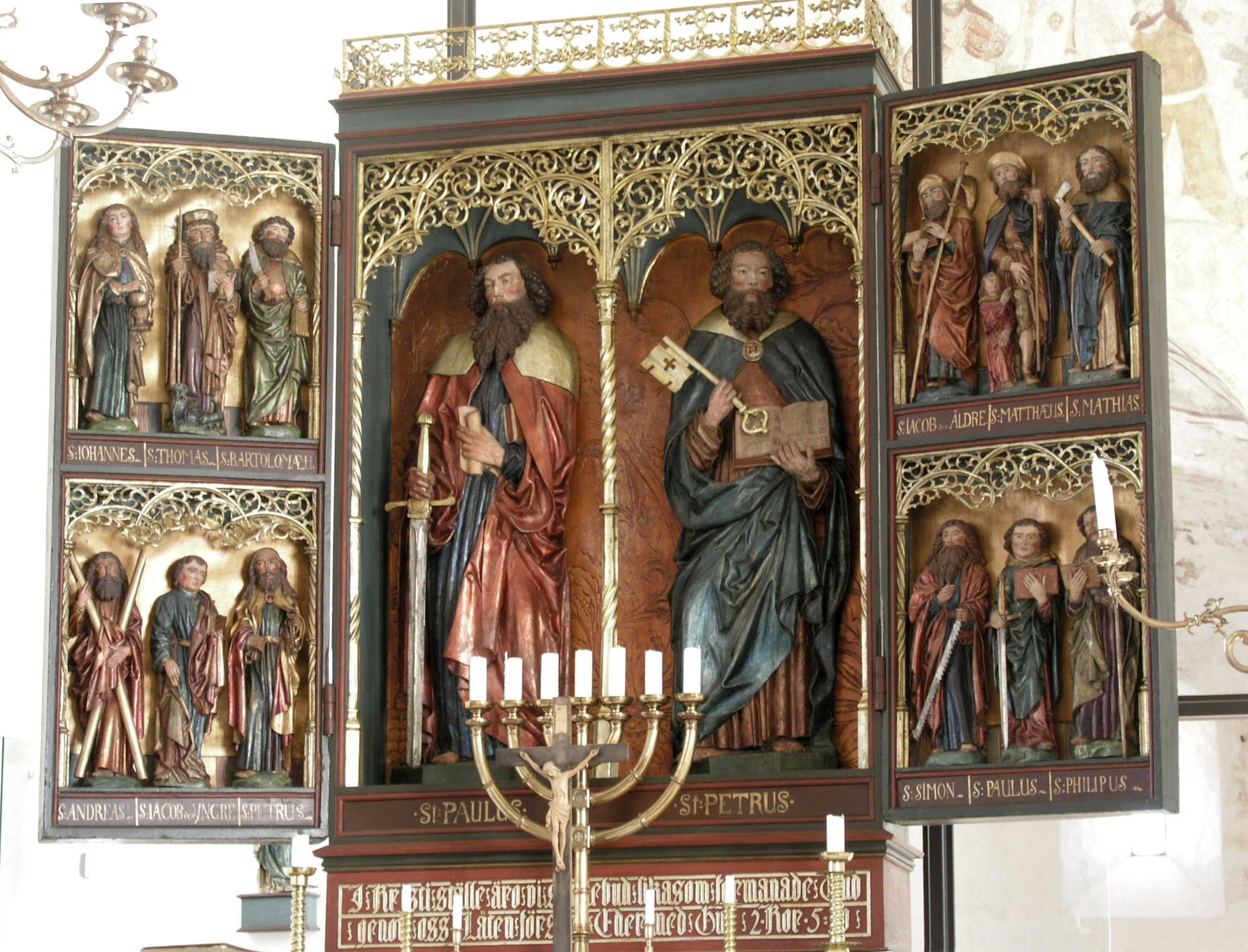
Altar cabinet
