= Voxtorp Church, Kalmar County =

Church building in Kalmar Municipality, Sweden

Coordinates: 56°32′18″N 16°08′33″E

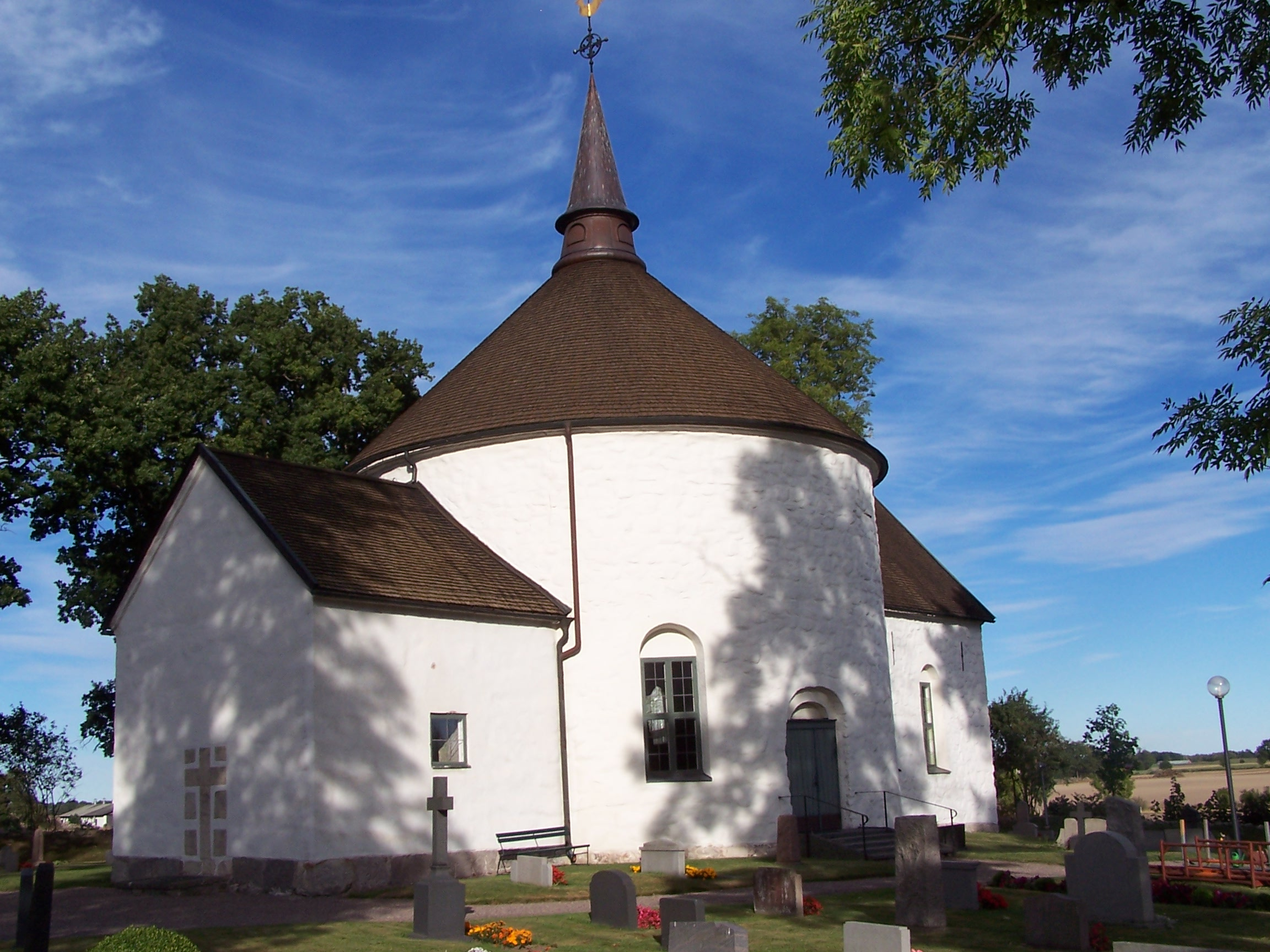
Voxtorp Church

Voxtorp Church (Swedish: Voxtorps kyrka) is a medieval round church in Kalmar County in Sweden. It belongs to the parish of Halltorp-Voxtorps in the Diocese of Växjö.

== History and architecture ==
The church was built around 1240 in tufted sandstone and cobblestone and painted with white paint. It may have been one storey higher. It is a so-called fortified church and was built to serve multiple uses. Several such churches, that could be used for many purposes as places of worship, defense and also storage were during this time built along the east coast of Småland and on Öland island. It is one of only eight medieval round churches in Sweden to survive to this day. It is located not far from Hagby Church, another round church with a similar history which probably pre-dates Voxtorp Church and may have served as a source of inspiration.

The church building was altered during the 14th century, when the current choir and probably also sacristy were built. In 1667 the annular thin arch collapsed. The thin vault was then replaced with a flat roof. In 1895, the medieval armory in the south was demolished and replaced with an armory in the west. At the same time, the flat roof was torn down and replaced by a plaster dome. In 1958 the church suffered damage following being hit by lightning. Subsequently, renovated under the direction of architect Erik Lundgren (1895-1969).

== Gallery ==
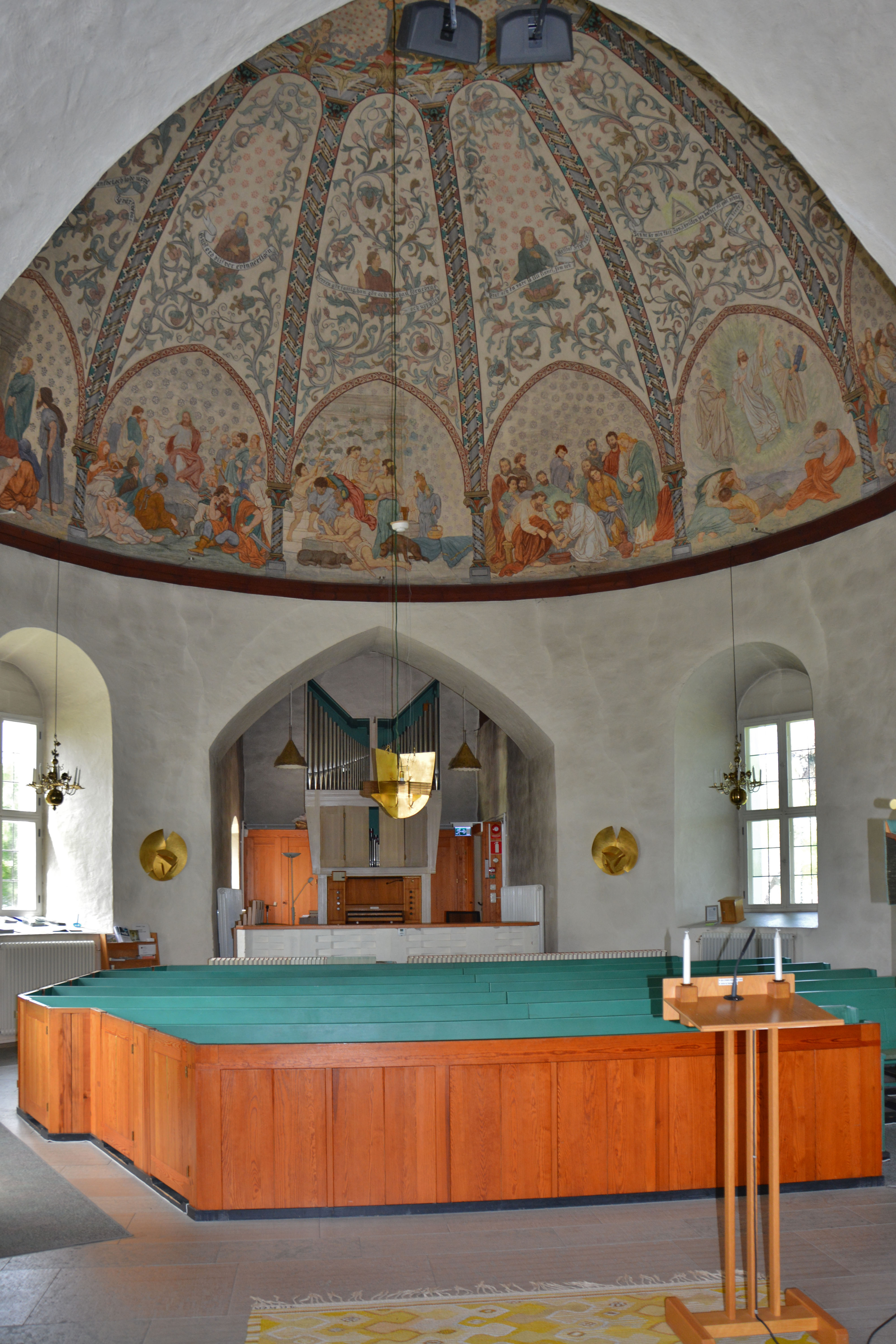
Church room to the west

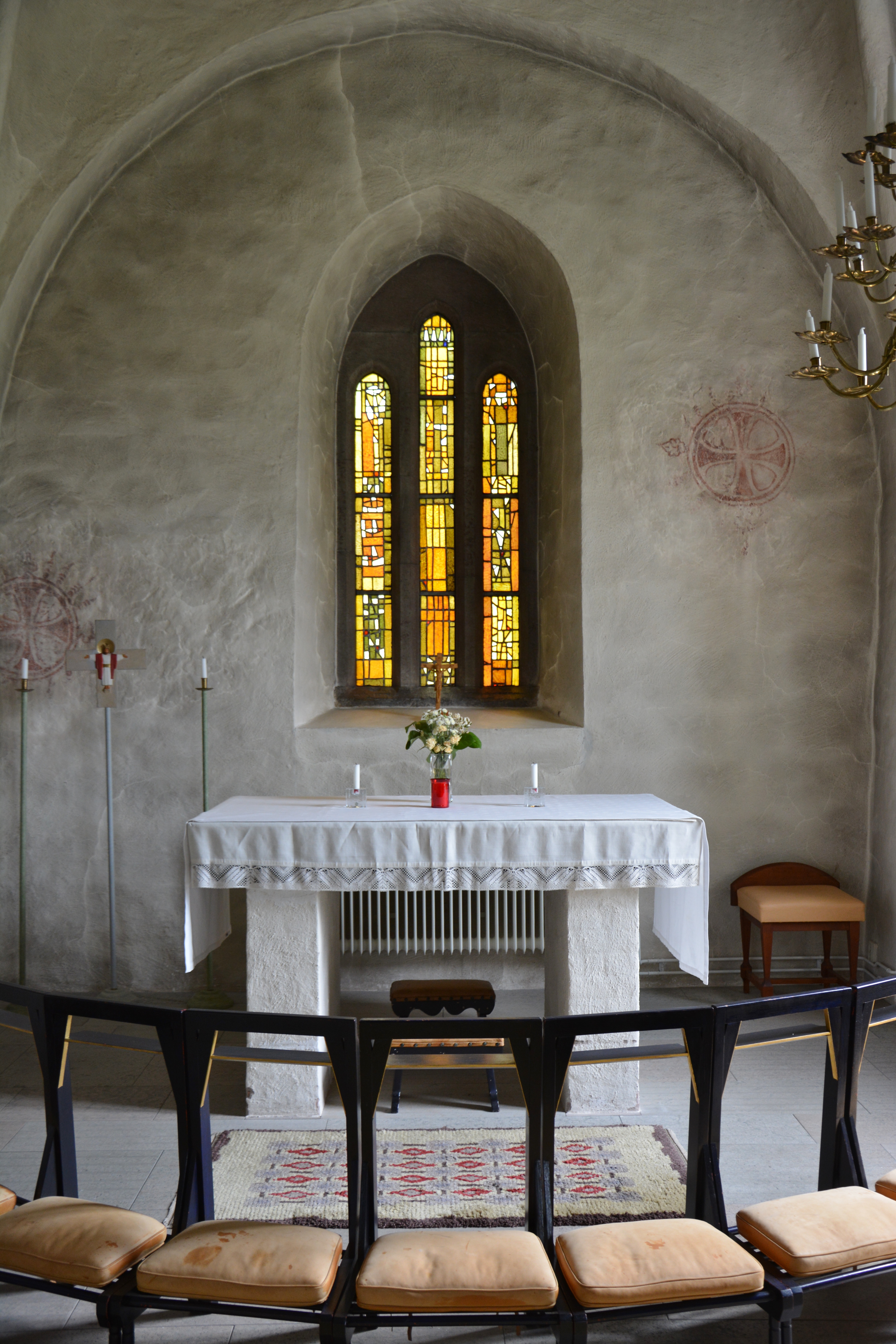
Choir with two consecration crosses painted on the wall.

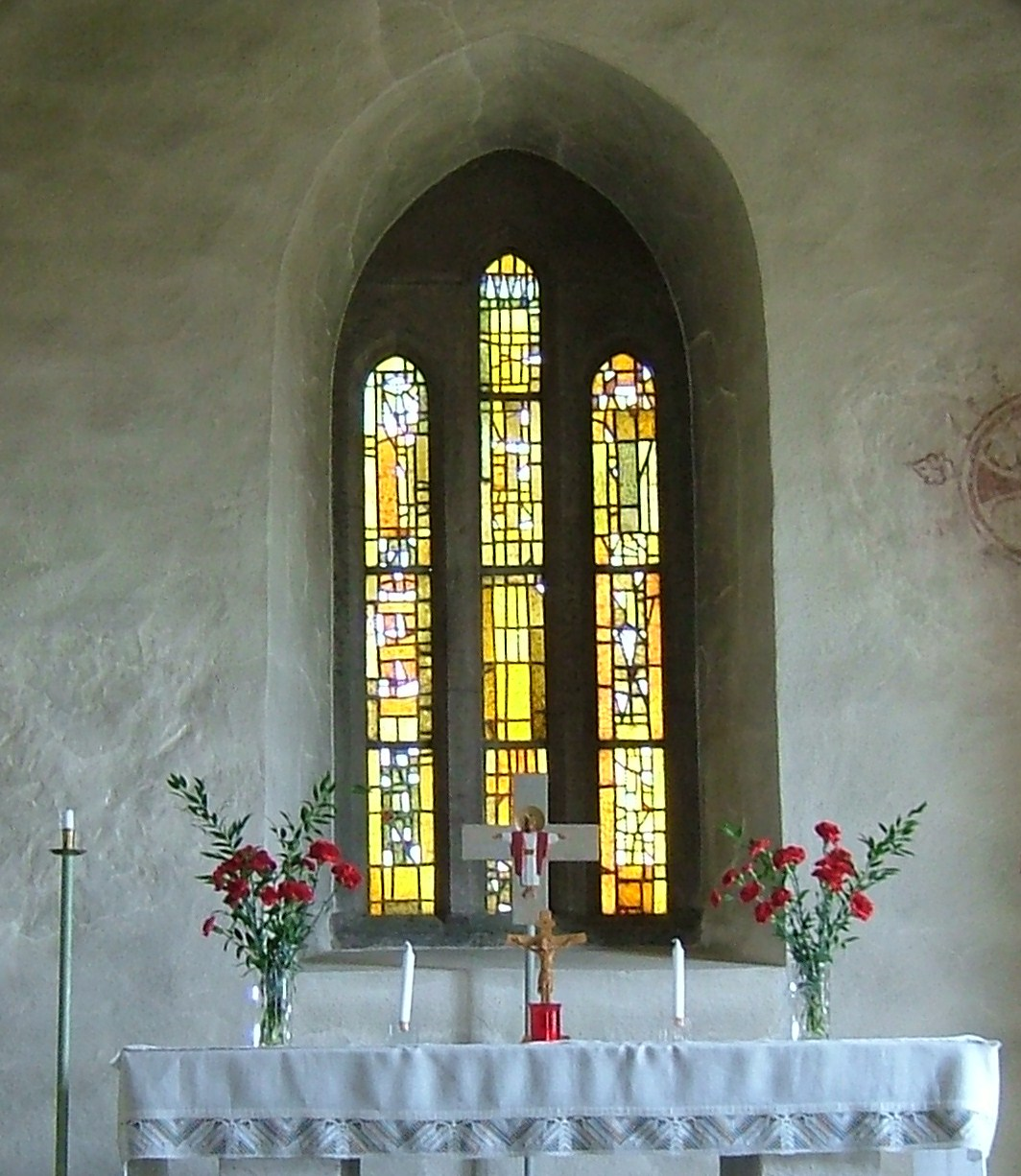
Chancel window

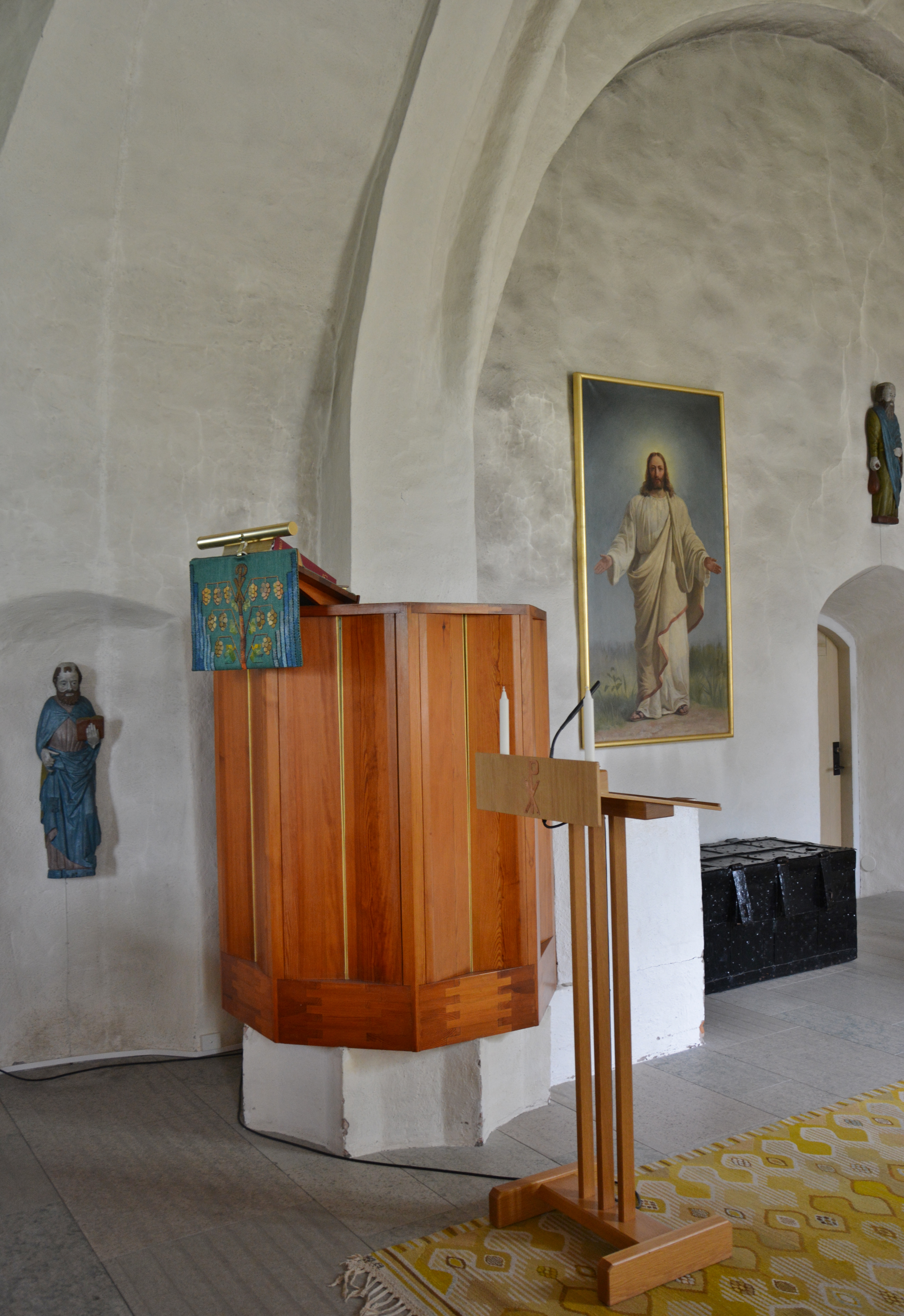
Pulpit

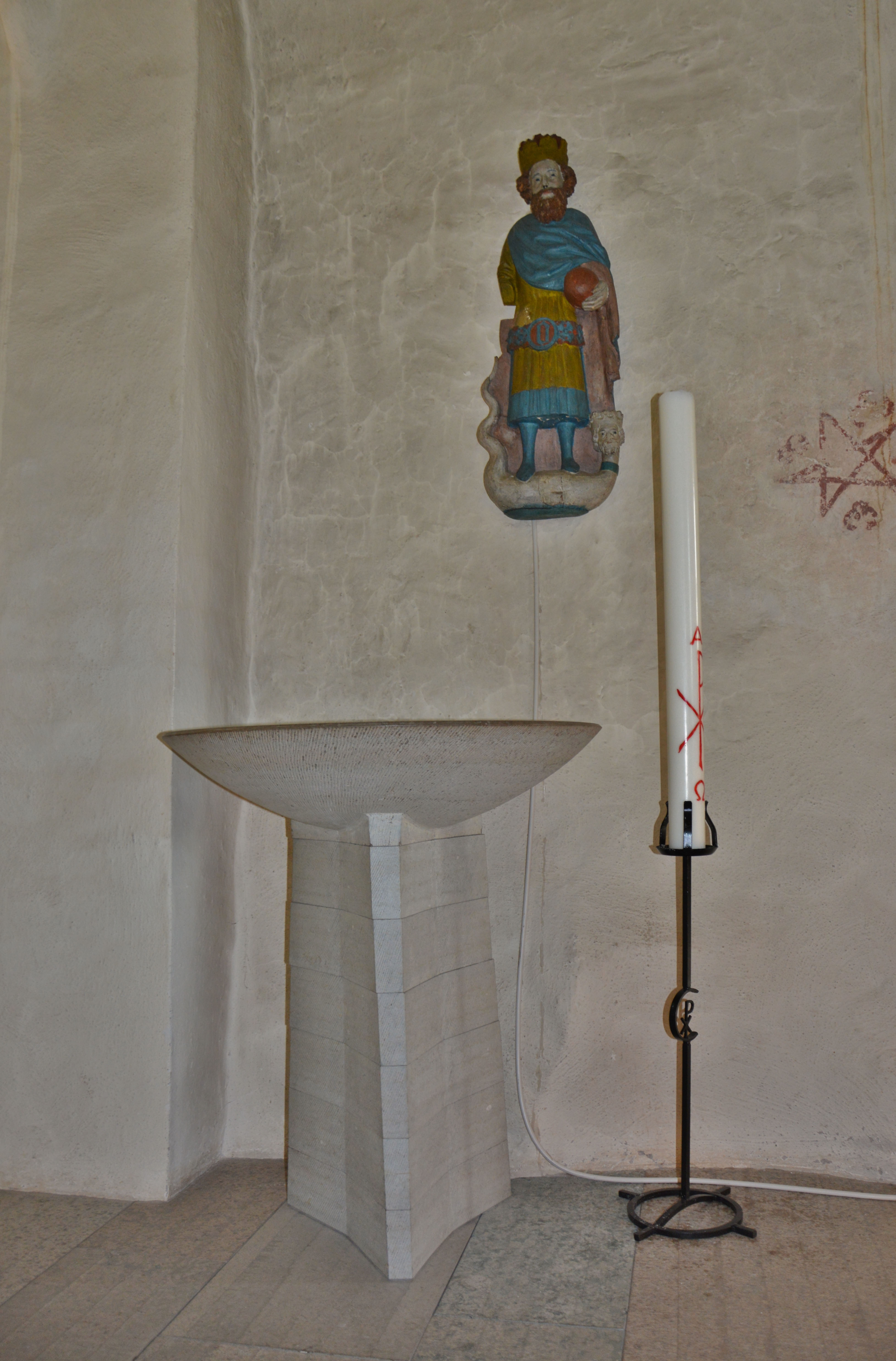
Baptismal

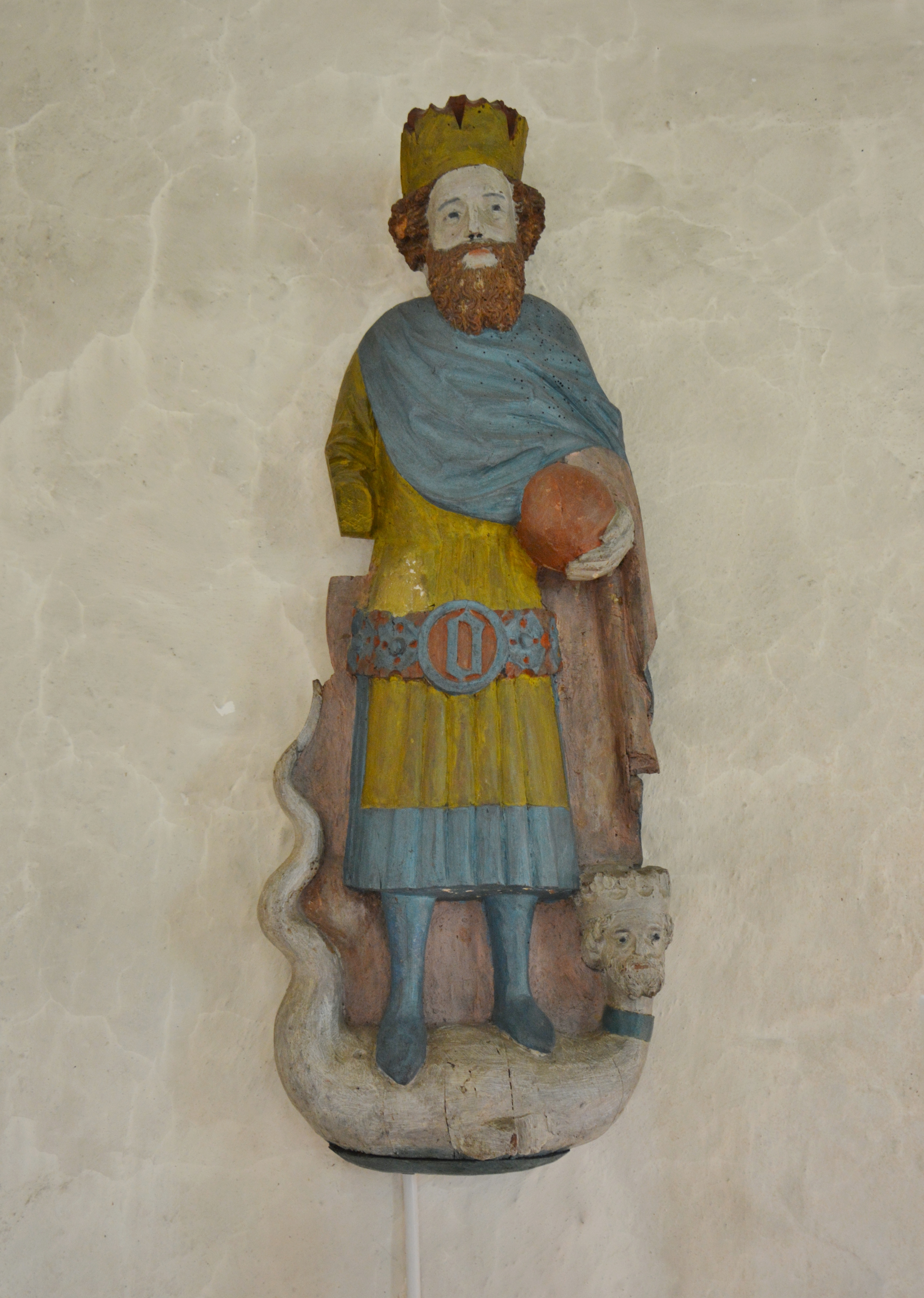
Saint Olof

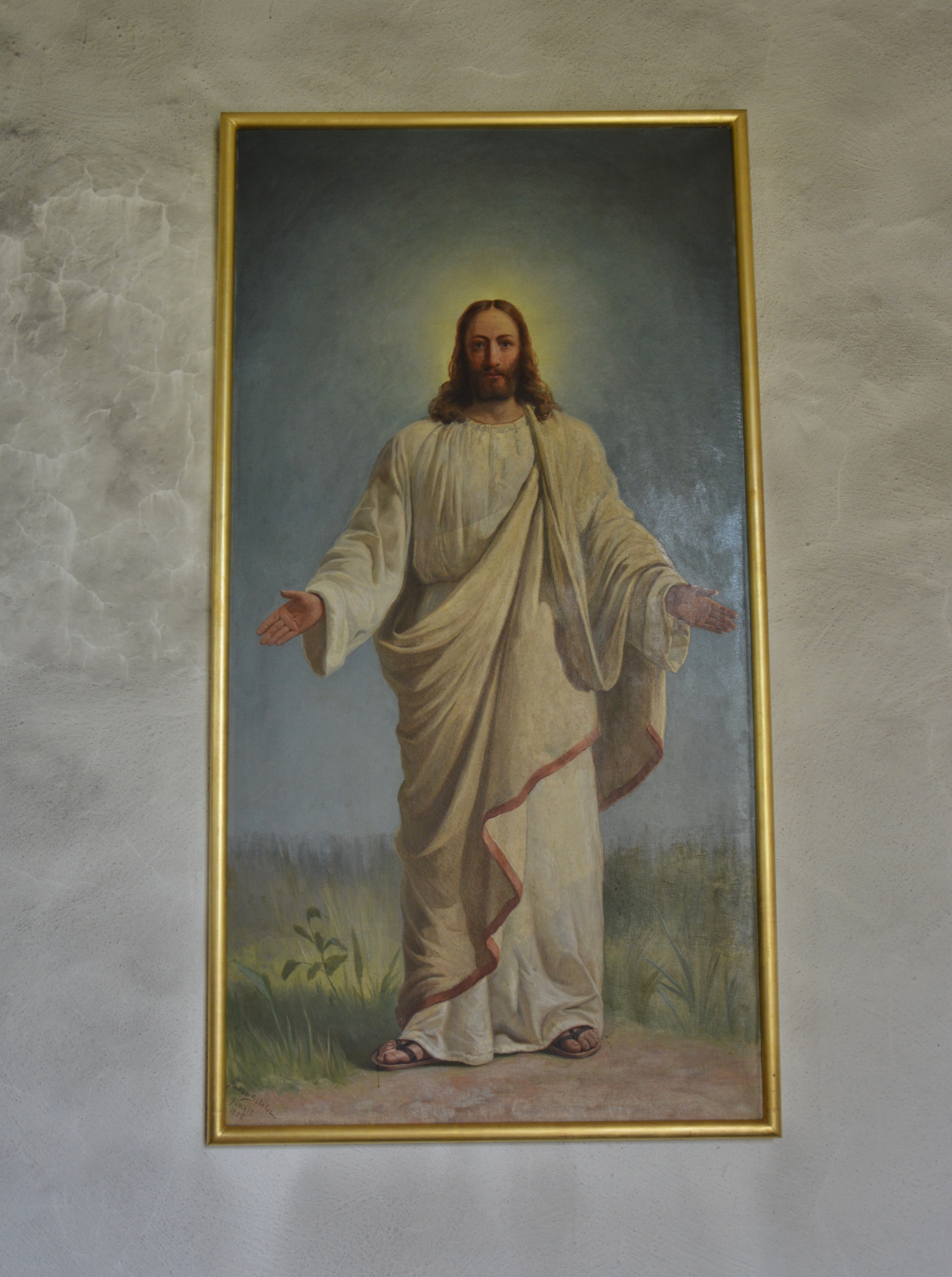
Former altarpiece

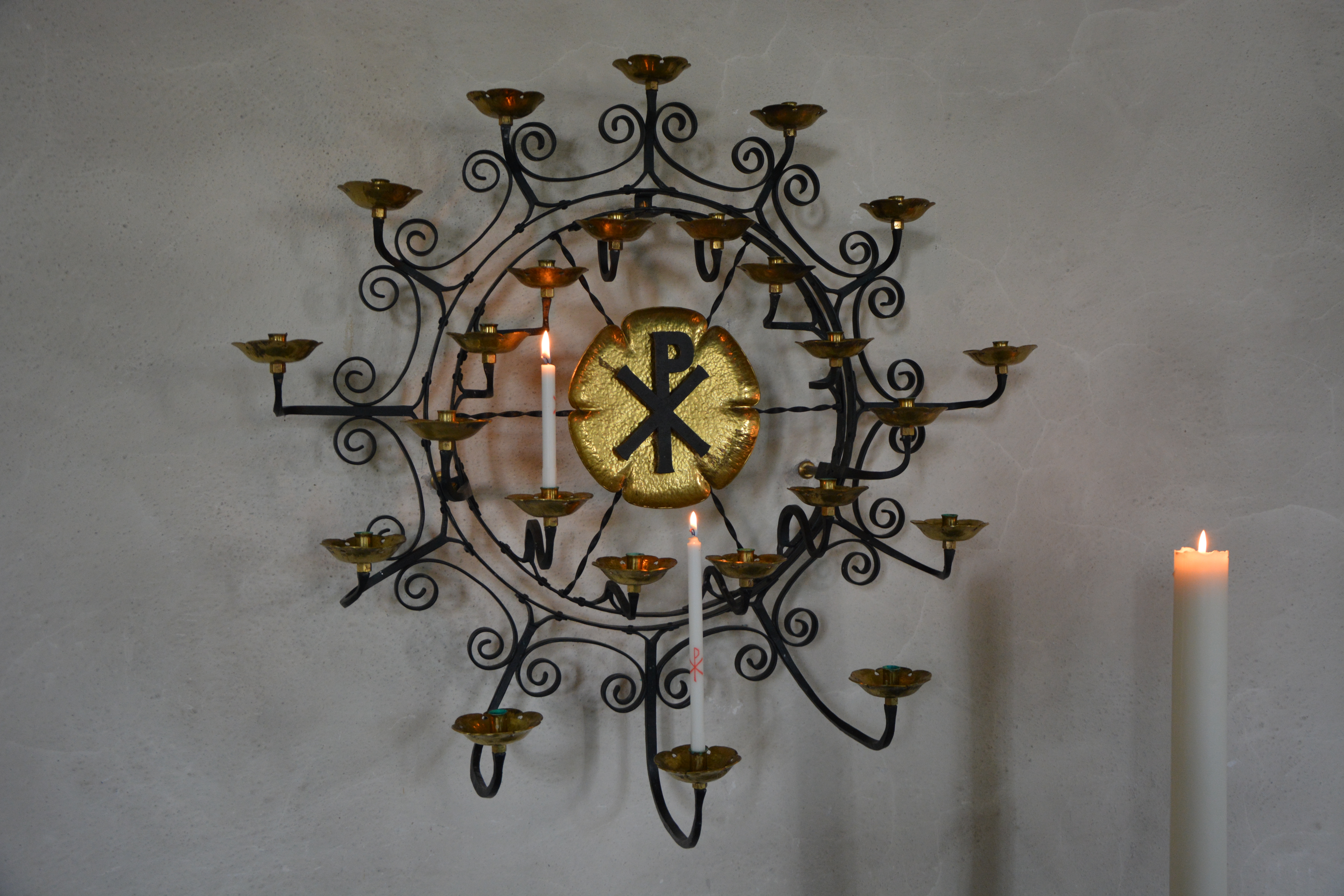
Lighting fixture bearer
