= Skörstorp Church =

Coordinates: 58°07′32″N 13°43′55″E

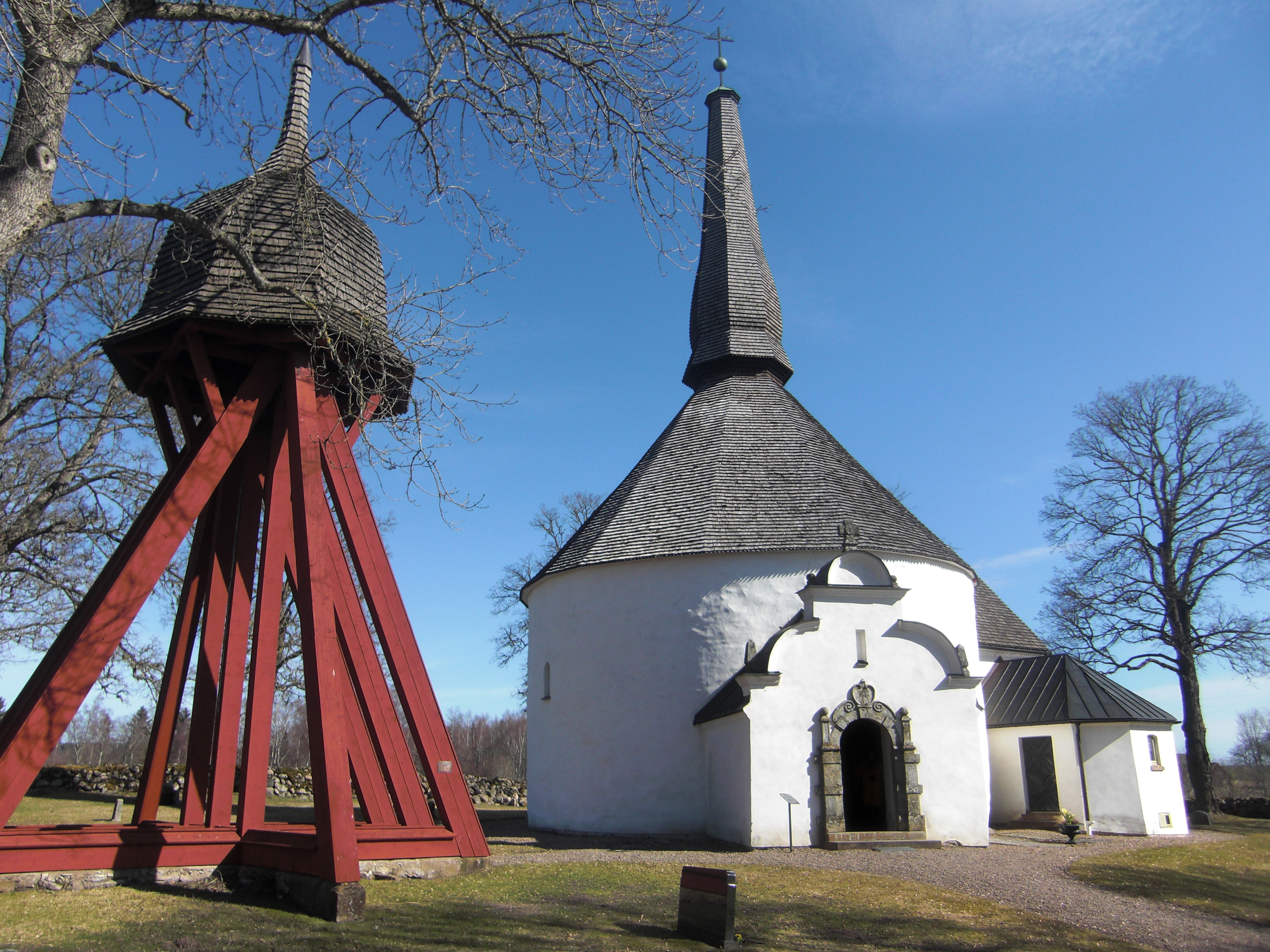
Skörstorp Church, view of the exterior

Skörstorp Church (Swedish: Skörstorps kyrka) is a medieval round church in Västra Götaland County in Sweden. It belongs to the Diocese of Skara.

== Description ==
The church was built in the middle of the 12th century, and is the only remaining medieval round church in the Diocese of Skara. It derives its shape from originally being built to serve several different purposes; apart from a place of worship, it also served a defensive purpose, i.e. it was a fortified church. The church has been altered successively throughout the centuries. The church porch is not original though it may date from the Middle Ages. The large wooden spire was built in 1666, and a burial chapel for the Spens family was built in 1660. The burial chapel has served as the sacristy since 1810. Among the furnishings, the baptismal font is the oldest and dates from the 13th century. The altarpiece was donated to the church in 1748, while the pulpit was made in 1709. The church has two church bells, the larger of them was made in 1526. The vaults supporting the church ceiling were probably built at the end of the Middle Ages.
