= Polus (disambiguation) =

Polus may refer to:

== People ==
- Polus, a figure in Greek philosophy
- Polus of Aegina, an ancient Greek actor
- Aleksander Polus, a Polish boxer
- Kazimierz Polus, a Polish serial killer
- Tomas Polus, a Swedish politician
- Coeus, an ancient Greek Titan; called Polus in Roman mythology

== Other uses ==
- SS Messina, a German steamship renamed Polus when transferred to the Soviet Union
- Polyus (spacecraft), a weapons spacecraft also referred to as Polus
- Polus, a map in the video game Among Us

== See also ==
- Polis (disambiguation)
