= Polis (disambiguation) =

Polis is the ancient Greek concept of the city-state or body of citizens.

Polis may also refer to:

== Places ==
- Polis, Albania, a village
- Polis, Cyprus, a town in Paphos District
- Polis, Crete, an early name of modern Argyroupoli, Rethymno
- Constantinople, colloquially referred to historically as Polis
- Mount Polis, Philippines
- Oasis Polis, ancient Greek colony

== People ==
- Jared Polis, American politician

== Other uses ==
- Polis (surname)
- Polis (journalism think tank)
- Polis (star), designated Mu Sagittarii Aa
- Polis (film), a 2014 American science fiction short
- Polis (album), by the French electronic artist Uppermost
- Polis (board game), an early strategy game from Ancient Greece
- Polis Institute - The Jerusalem Institute of Languages and Humanities
- Pol.is, a wiki survey software
- Polis Diraja Malaysia
- Polis, a Greek term for police
