= Solna Church =

Coordinates: 59°21′11″N 18°01′26.6″E

- Solna kyrka
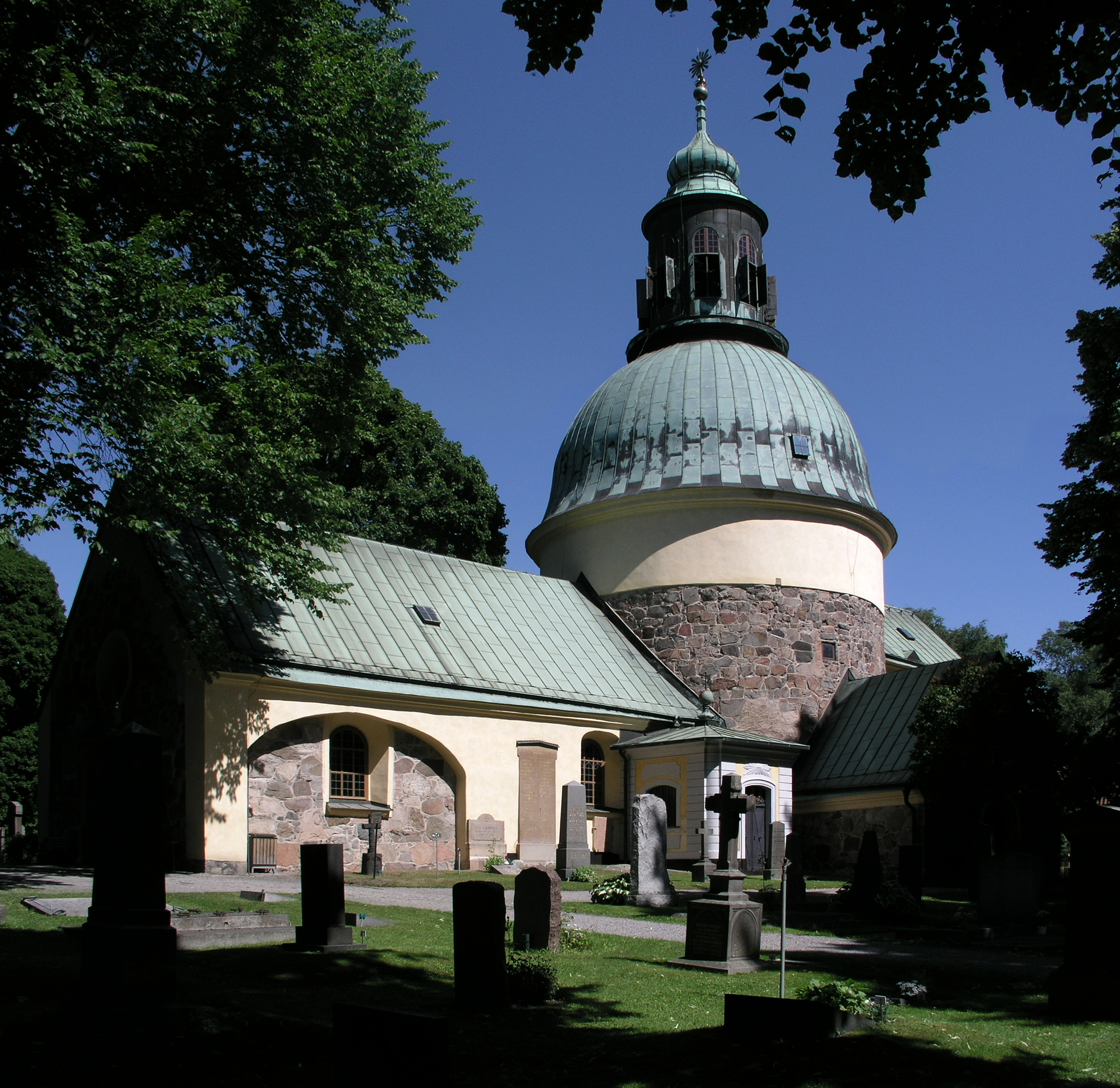
- Solna Church
- Solna Church
- Location: Solna
- Country: Sweden
- Denomination: Church of Sweden

History
- Consecrated: 12th century

Administration
- Diocese: Stockholm
- Parish: Solna

Solna Church (Swedish: Solna kyrka) is a so-called round church in Solna Municipality near Stockholm, Sweden. It is part of Solna Parish in the Diocese of Stockholm. The church is located on the headland between Brunnsviken and Ulvsundasjön, at the southern end of the cemetery Norra begravningsplatsen. The oldest parts of the church are from the later 12th century, a Romanesque fortress church built in stone.

Today the church consists of a roundhouse, weaponhouse, choir, nave, sacristy, and two chancel tombs.

== Church buildings ==
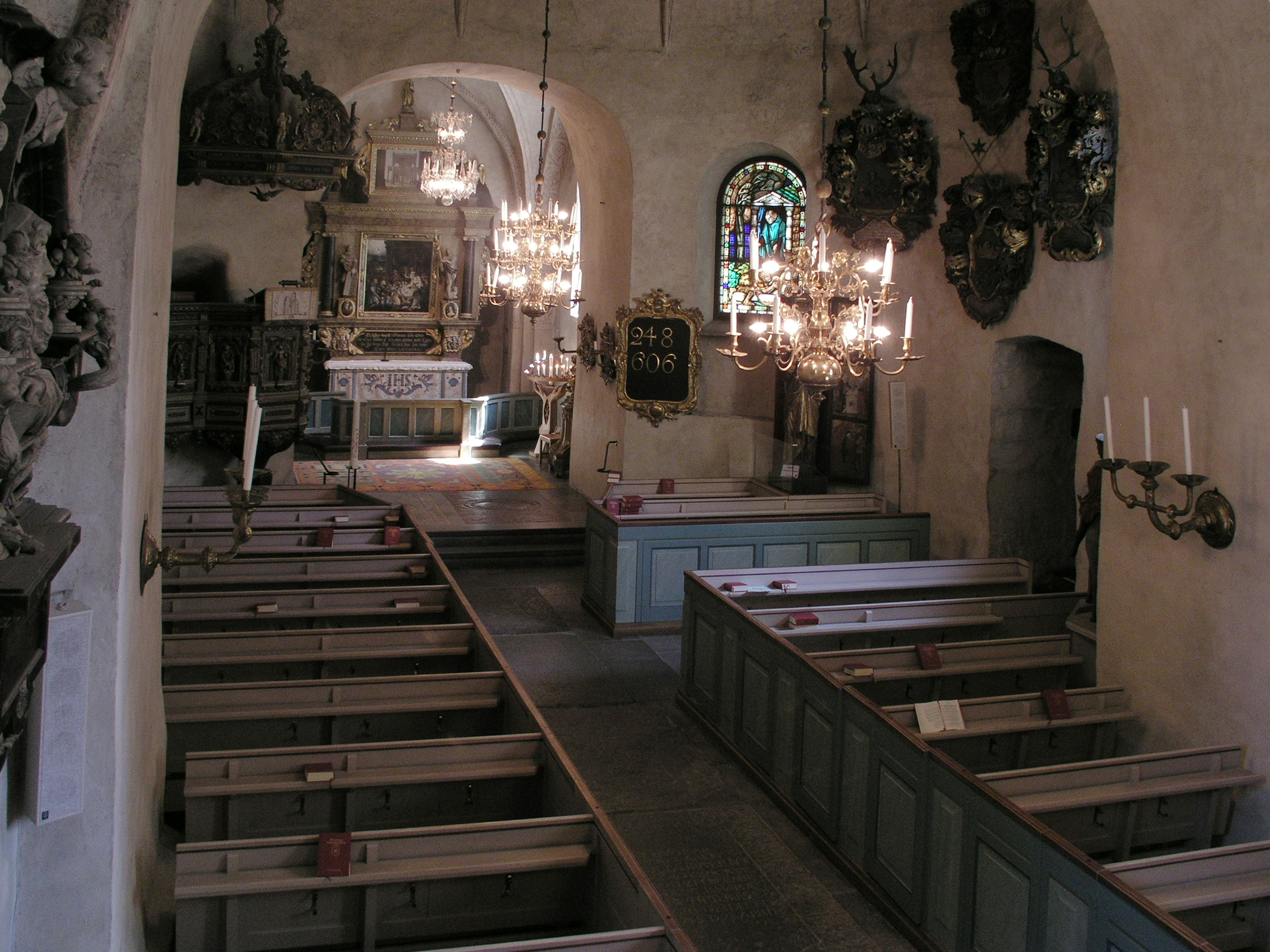
Nave

The oldest part of the church, the roundhouse, originates from the late 12th century, and was especially built for defense purposes. Attached to this round center is a weaponhouse (south), a rectangular choir to the east, and a rectangular nave to the west. North of the choir is the sacristy, and to the east an octagonal chancel tomb. There is a second chancel tomb on the south side of the nave. The roundhouse (central tower) is covered by a tall cupola, which dominates the appearance of the church. The choir was added in the 13th century. The oldest part of the nave is from the 14th century, and was extended during the 15th century, when the weaponhouse and sacristy were built.

== Decorations ==
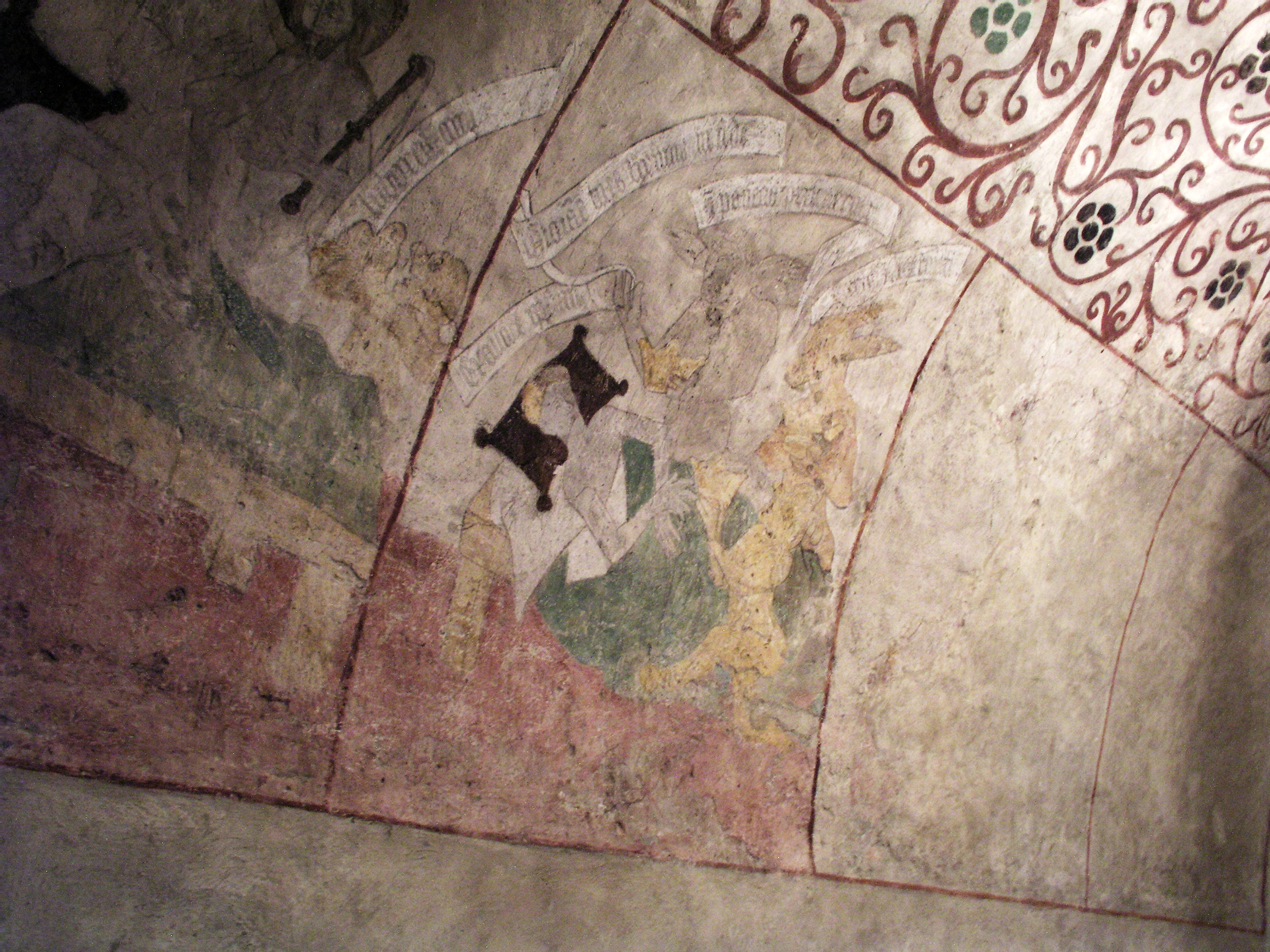
Ceiling paintings

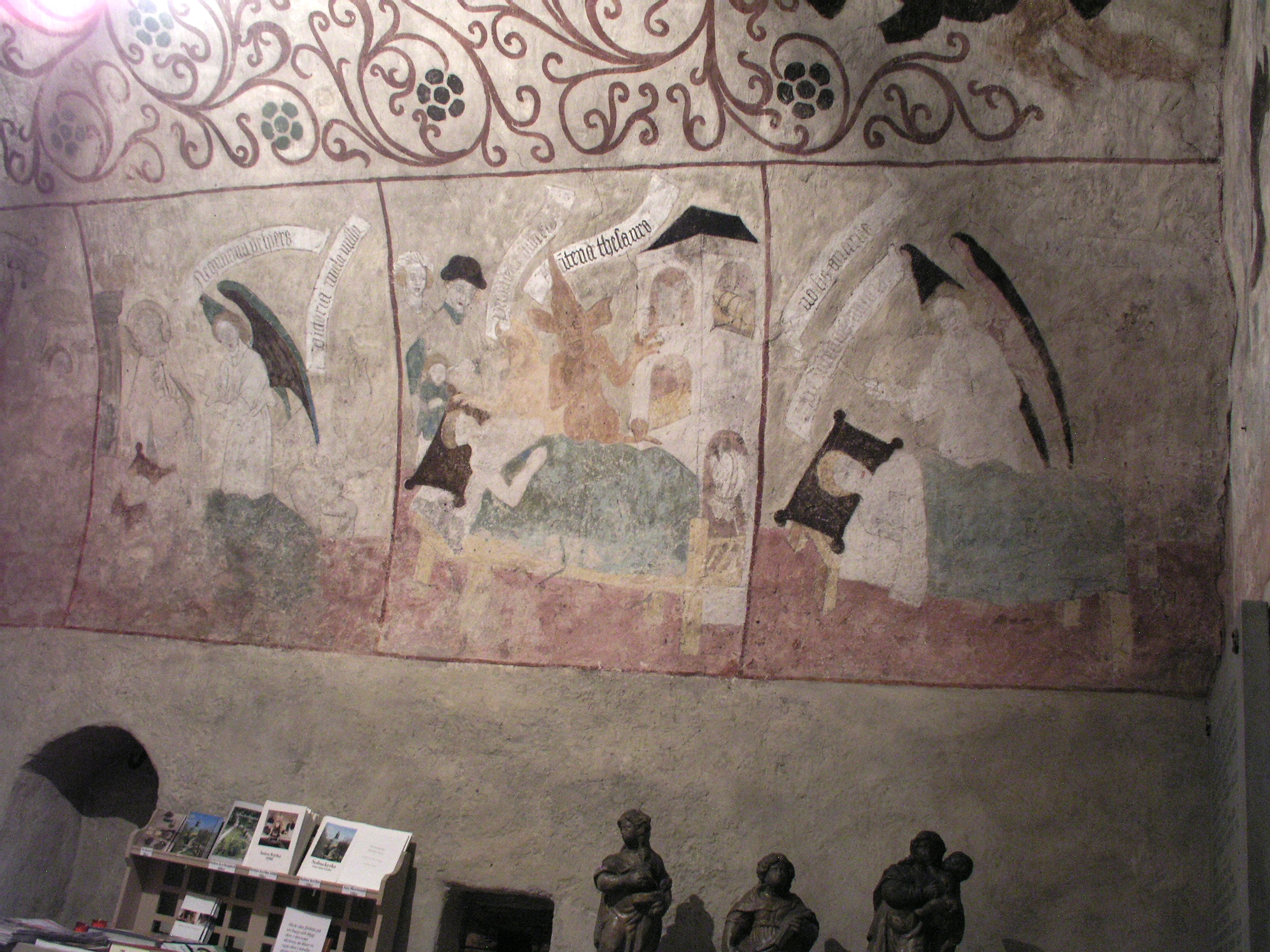
Ceiling paintings

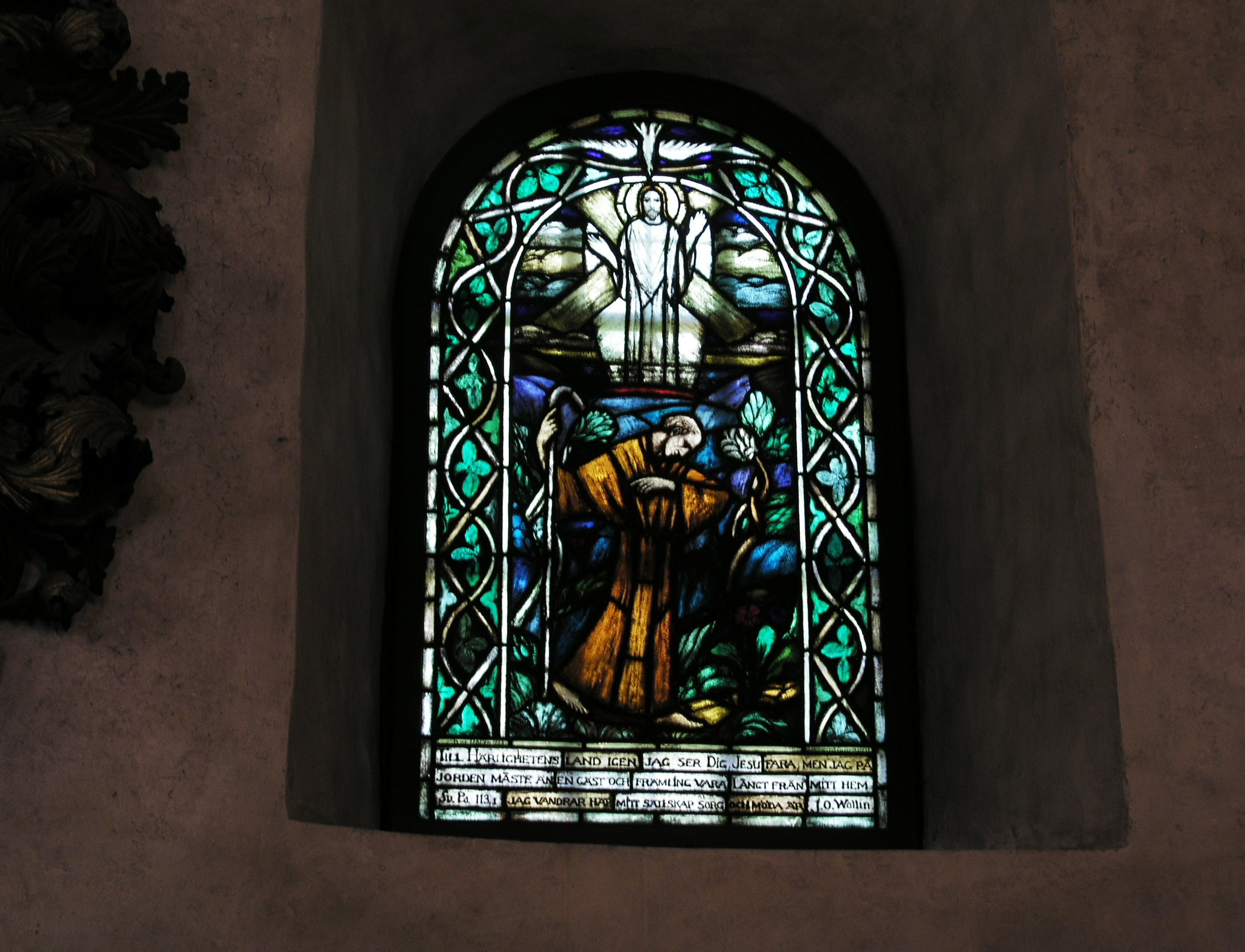
Church window

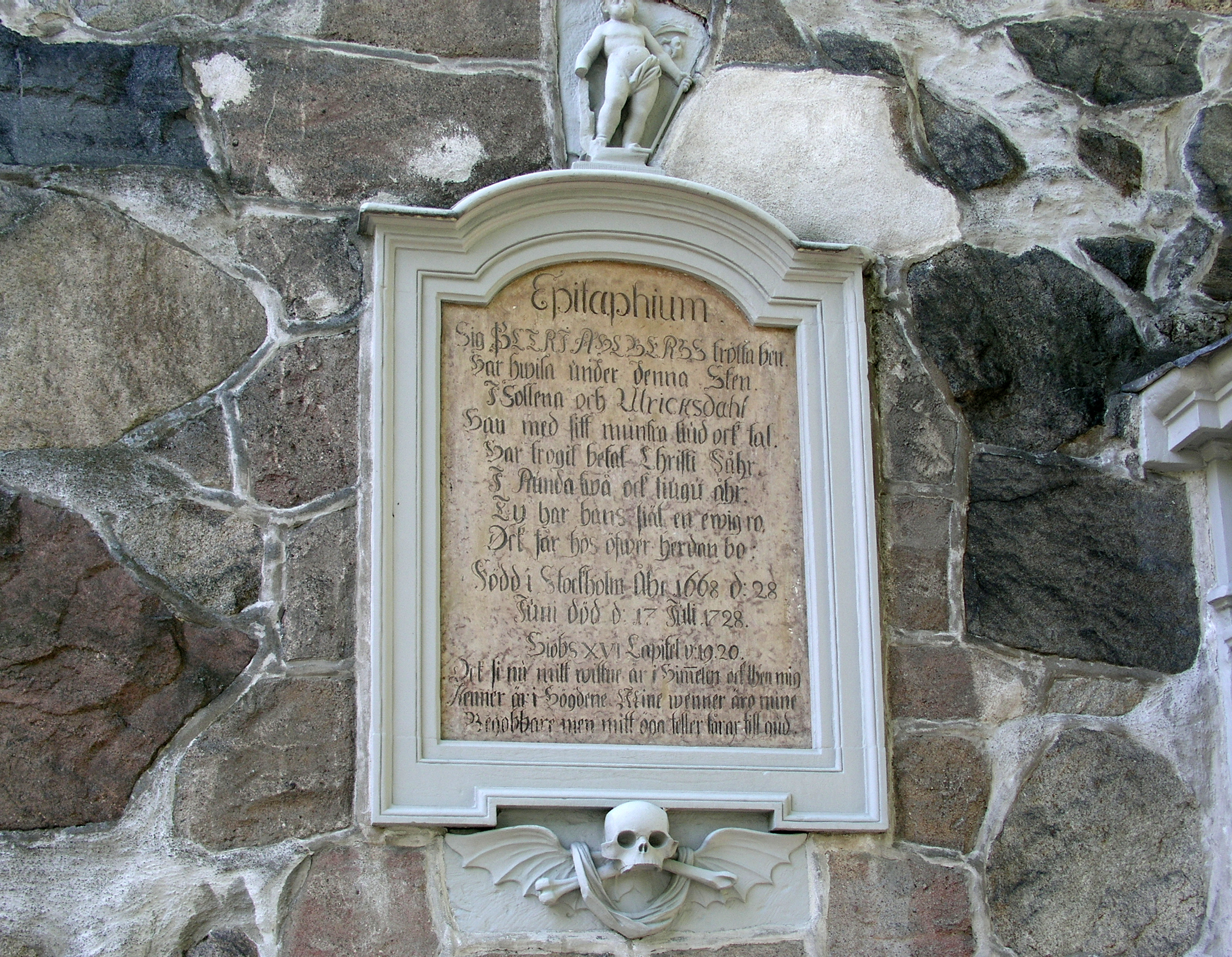
Epitaph

The church achieved large parts of its interior under the patronage of Magnus Gabriel de la Gardie. In 1674 the western portal was added, a sculptured portal originally constructed for Karlberg Palace in 1637, and moved to Solna Church in 1674. In 1708 Queen Ulrika Eleonora commissioned a chancel tomb dedicated to count Tomas Polus. The roof was destroyed in a fire in 1723, and the current cupola was built after this incident. The Lange chancel tomb was constructed in the 1780s. In 1883 the church was given a roof of copper plates.

A major restoration took place in 1928 under supervision of architect Erik Fant, when the church's medieval paintings were recovered. The medieval murals from ca. 1440 are attributed to Albertus Pictor.

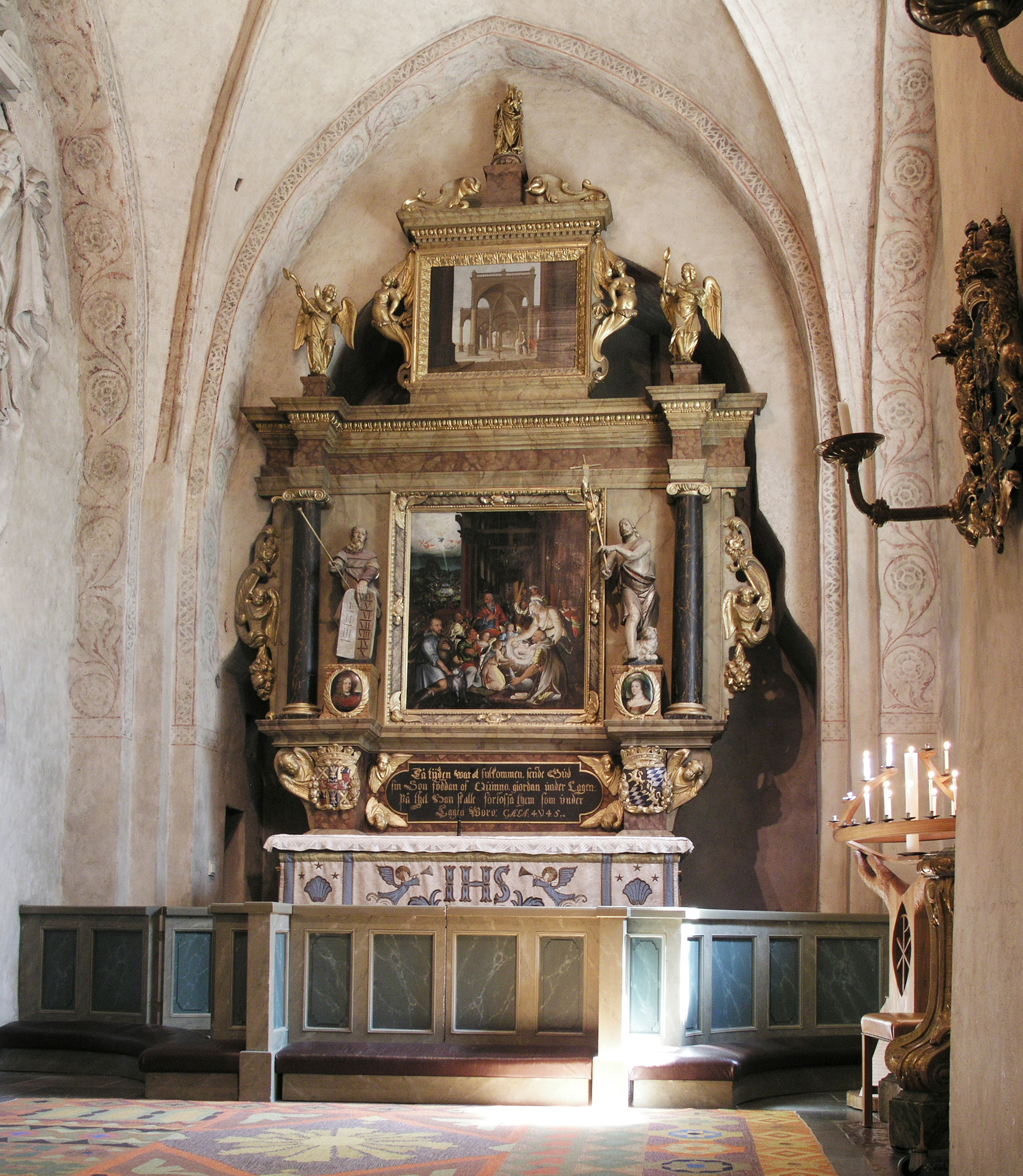
Altar

The choir is dominated by the altarpiece, sculpted in wood in 1666 by Hans Jerling. The altarpiece frames two oil paintings with biblical motifs, and is crowned by a wood-sculptured Madonna from the late 16th century, while the altar is made of brick and covered by a limestone plate.

== Literary reference ==
Solna Church is mentioned in Carl Michael Bellman's song "Haga" (Fredmans Sånger No. 64).

== Other round churches ==
Other Swedish round churches are Bromma Church, Munsö Church, Voxtorp Church, Hagby Church, Valleberga Church, Skörstorp Church and Vårdsberg Church.

== See also ==
- Ulriksdal Palace
- List of churches in Stockholm
