= Himeraeus =

Person from ancient Greece

Himeraeus or Himeraios (Ancient Greek: Ἱμεραῖος; died 322 BC), of the borough of Phalerus in Attica, was son of Phanostratus, and brother of the celebrated Demetrius of Phalerum.

We know but little of his life or political career, but it seems certain that he early adopted political views opposed to those of his brother, and became a supporter of the anti-Macedonian party at Athens. He is first mentioned as joining with Hypereides and others in prosecuting before the court of the Areopagus all those who were accused of having received bribes from Harpalus, Demosthenes among the rest.

During the Lamian War, he united in the efforts of the Athenians to throw off the yoke of Macedonia, and was in consequence one of the orators whose surrender was demanded by Antipater after his victory at the Battle of Crannon. To escape the fate that awaited him, he fled from Athens to Aegina, and took refuge, together with Hyperides and Aristonicus, in the temple of Aeacus; but they were dragged from this sanctuary by Archias of Thurii, and sent as prisoners to Antipater, who immediately put them all to death in 322 BCE.

Lucian speaks very disparagingly of Himeraeus, as a mere demagogue, indebted to the circumstances of the moment for a temporary influence.
