= Phaselis =

Greek and Roman city on the coast of ancient Lycia

- Φασηλίς (Greek)
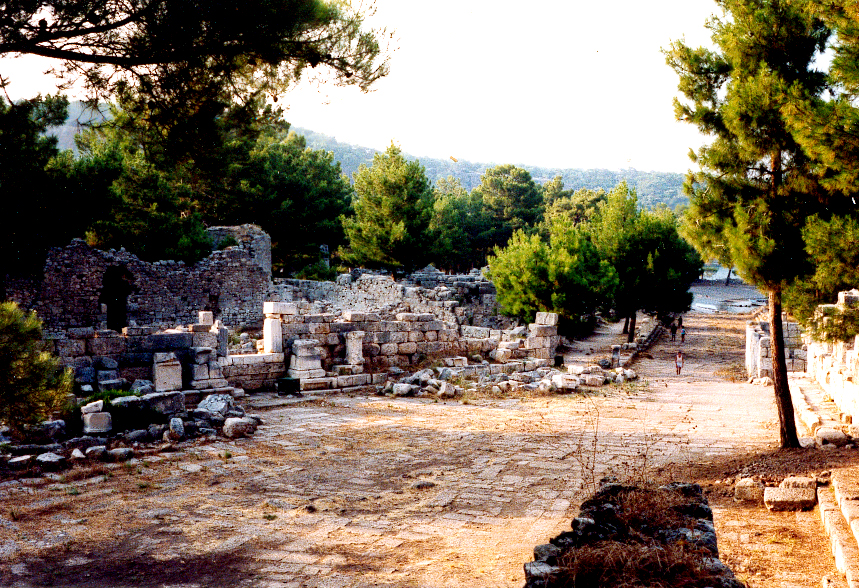
- Main road

- Location within Turkey
- 36°31′25″N 30°33′08″E
- Type: Settlement
- Periods: Archaic to High Medieval
- Associated with: Theodectes
- Location: Tekirova, Antalya Province, Turkey
- Region: Lycia

History
- Built: 700 BC
- Built by: Rhodian colonists

Site notes
- Condition: Ruined
- Owner: Public
- Public access: Yes
- Website: Phaselis Archaeological Site

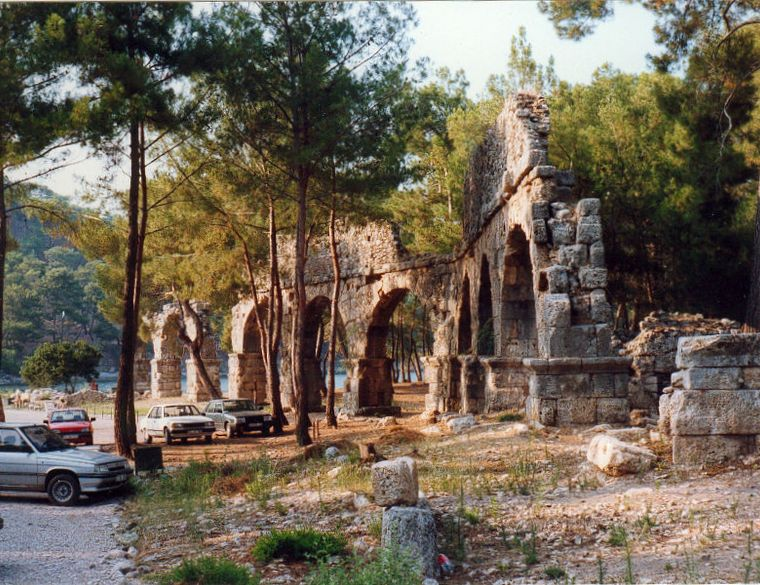
The aqueduct

Phaselis (Ancient Greek: Φασηλίς) or Faselis (Turkish: Faselis) was a Greek and Roman city on the coast of ancient Lycia. Its ruins are located north of the modern town Tekirova in the Kemer district of Antalya Province in Turkey. It lies between the Bey Mountains and the forests of Olympos National Park, 16 kilometres (9.9 mi) south of the tourist town of Kemer and on the 57th kilometre of the Antalya–Kumluca highway. Phaselis and other ancient towns around the shore can also be accessed from the sea by daily yacht tours.

== History ==
The town was set up by the Rhodians in 690 BC. Because of its location on an isthmus separating two harbours, it became the most important harbour city of eastern Lycia and an important centre of commerce between Greece, Asia, Egypt, and Phoenicia, although it did not belong to the Lycian League. The city was captured by the Persians after they conquered Asia Minor. Cimon, in 468 BC, attacked the city and it was enrolled in the Delian Confederacy. Later it was captured by Alexander the Great.

After the death of Alexander, the city remained in Greek hands from 209 BC to 197 BC, under the dynasty of Ptolemaios, and with the conclusion of the Apamea treaty, was handed over to the Rhodian Peraia, together with the other cities of Lycia. From 190 BC to 160 BC it remained under Rhodeian hegemony, but after 160 BC it was absorbed into the Lycian confederacy under Roman rule. Phaselis, like Olympos, was under constant threat from pirates in the 1st century BC, and the city was even taken over by the pirate Zekenites for a period until his defeat in 77 or 76 BC by the Romans under Publius Servilius Vatia Isauricus. In 42 BC Brutus had the city linked to Rome. In the 3rd century AD, the harbor fell under the threat of pirates once again. So it began to lose importance, suffering further losses at the hands of Arab ships, until totally impoverished in the 11th century. When the Seljuqs began to concentrate on Alanya and Antalya as ports, Phaselis ceased to be a port of any note.

There was a temple of Athene at Phaselis, where the lance of Achilles was exhibited. It was the birthplace of the poet and orator Theodectes. It was also renowned for its roses, from which the essence was extracted.

The Lindos Chronicle records dedications attributed to the Phaselitai. At the temple of Athena at Lindos, they dedicated helmets and sickle-swords bearing the inscription: "Phaselitai from the Solymi to Athena the Lindian, with Lakios the oikistes leading them."

== Bishopric ==
Phaselis became a Christian bishopric, a suffragan of the metropolitan see of Mira, the capital of the Roman province of Lycia. Its bishop Fronto took part in the Council of Chalcedon in 451. His successor, Aristodemus, was one of the signatories of the letter that in 458 the bishops of Lycia sent to Byzantine Emperor Leo I the Thracian concerning the murder of Proterius of Alexandria. The bishop of the time of the Second Council of Nicaea (787) did not attend, and the acts were signed in his name by a deacon called Ioannes.

No longer a residential bishopric, Phaselis is today listed by the Catholic Church as a titular see.

== Notable people ==
- Lacritus, a Greek sophist
- Critolaus, a Greek Peripatetic philosopher
- Theodectes, a Greek rhetorician and tragic poet

== Phaselis today ==
Phaselis has three harbours: the 'Northern Harbour', the 'Battle Harbour' and the 'Protected (Sun) Harbour', of which the last is the most important today. A 24-metre-wide ancient street runs through the middle of the city. The 'Hadrian Waterway Gate' is on the southern part of the street. There are ruins of shops and stores on the sides of the street and near these are ruins of public places such as Roman baths, agoras and theatres. These structures are dated to the 2nd century BC. There are water canals between the town centre and the 70 m plateau. There are also numerous sarcophagi.

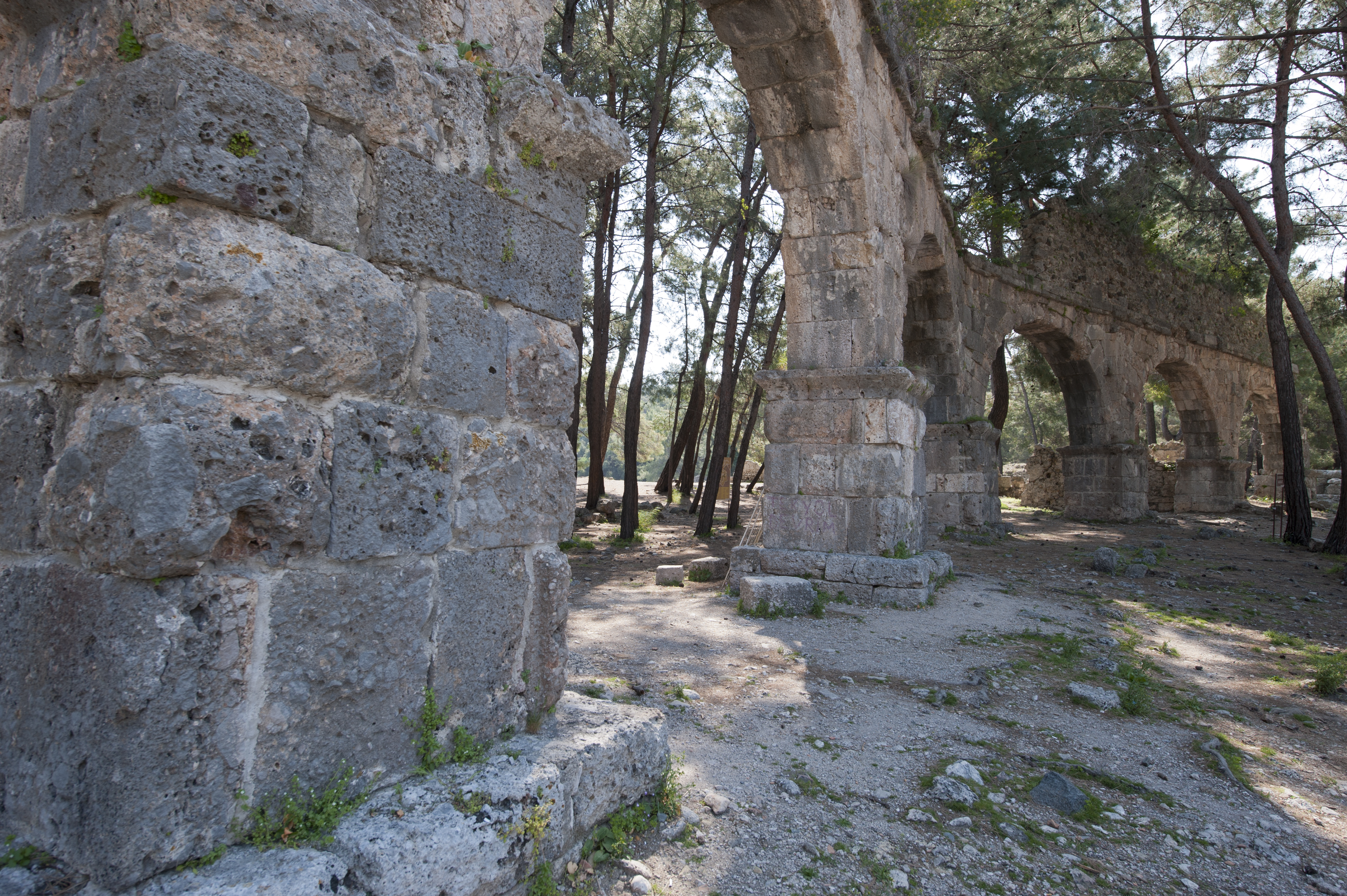
Phaselis Aqueduct

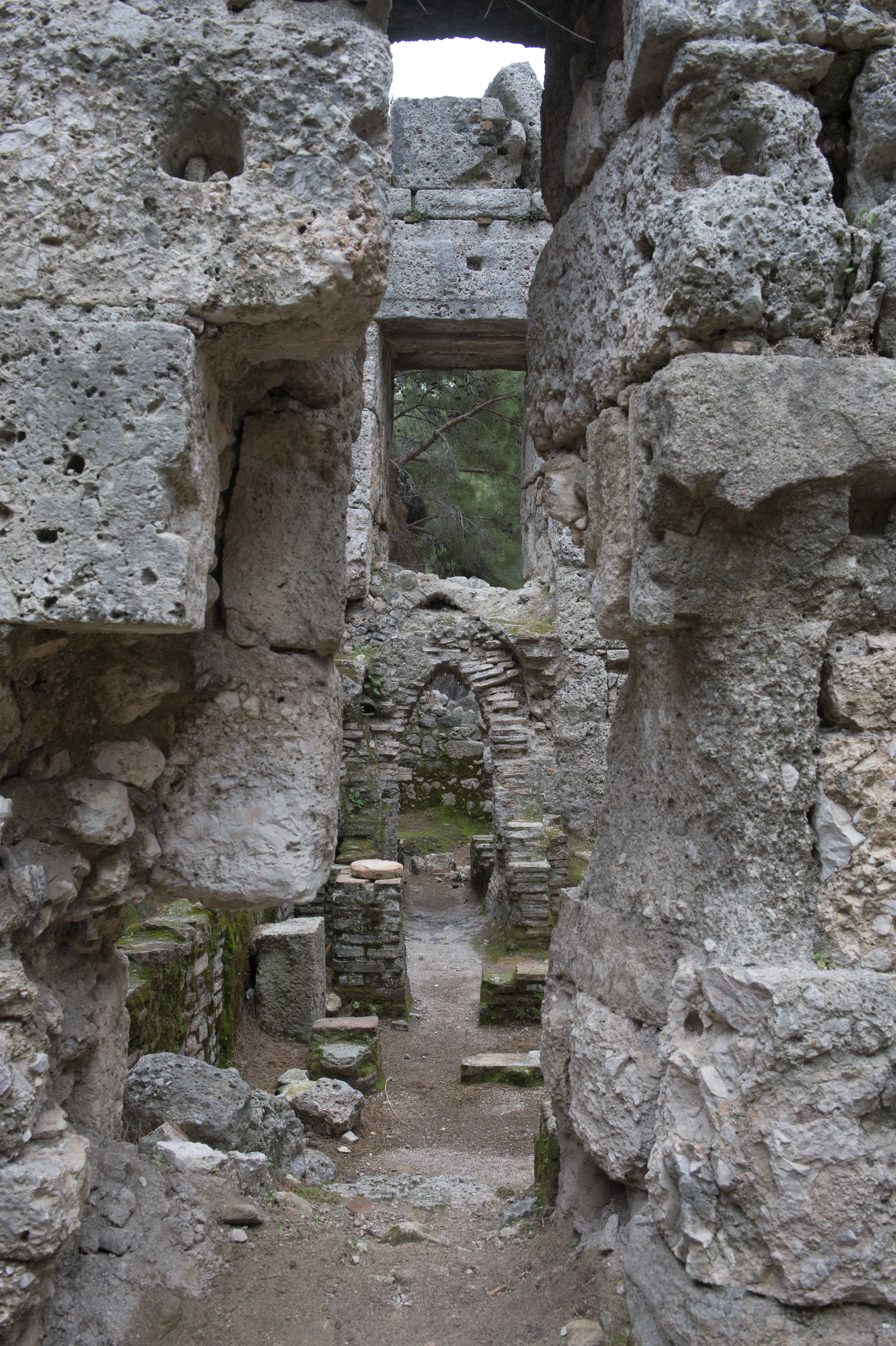
Phaselis Big Bath

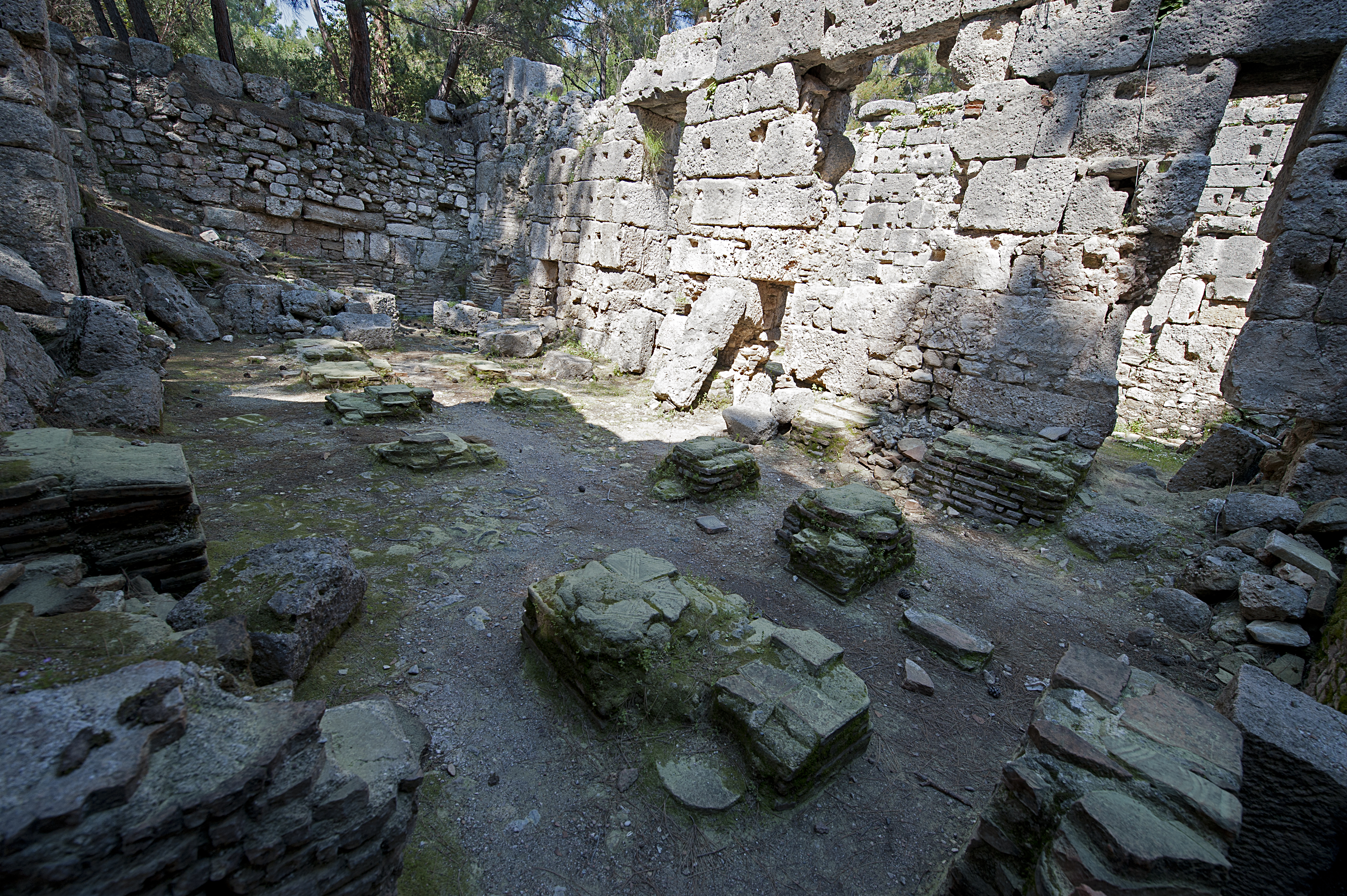
Phaselis Big Bath

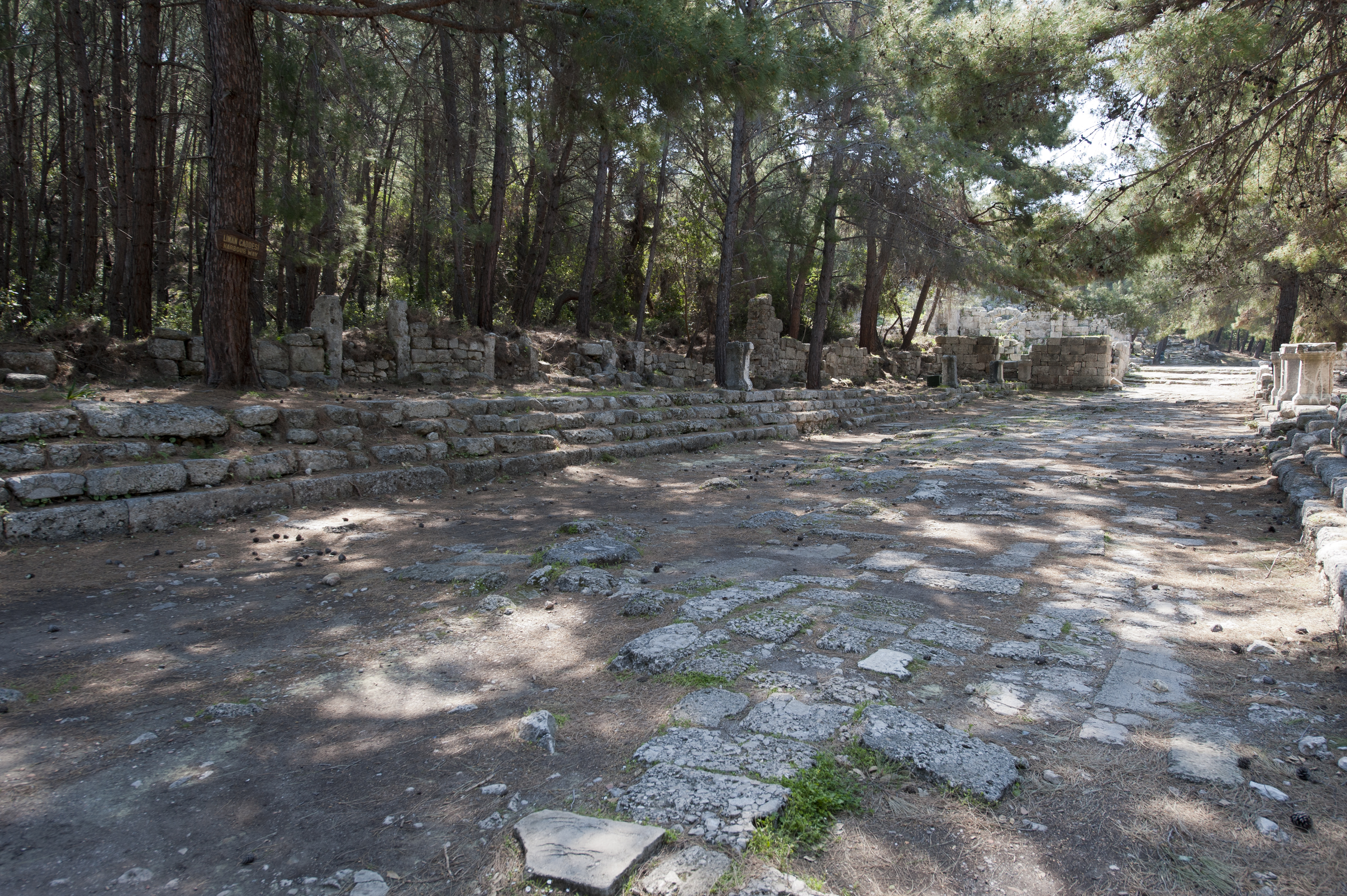
Phaselis Main Street

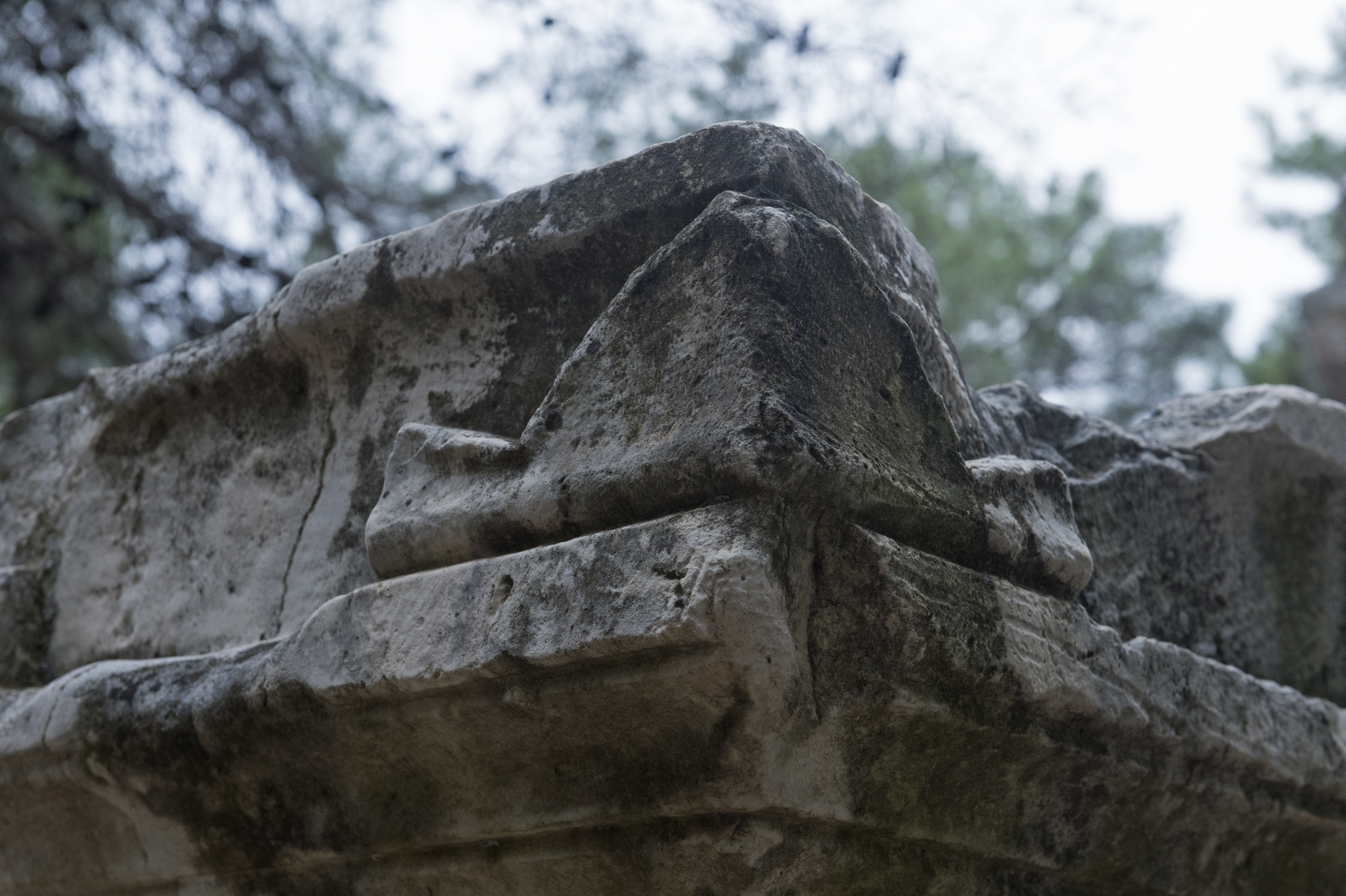
Phaselis Decoration near Hadrian's Gate

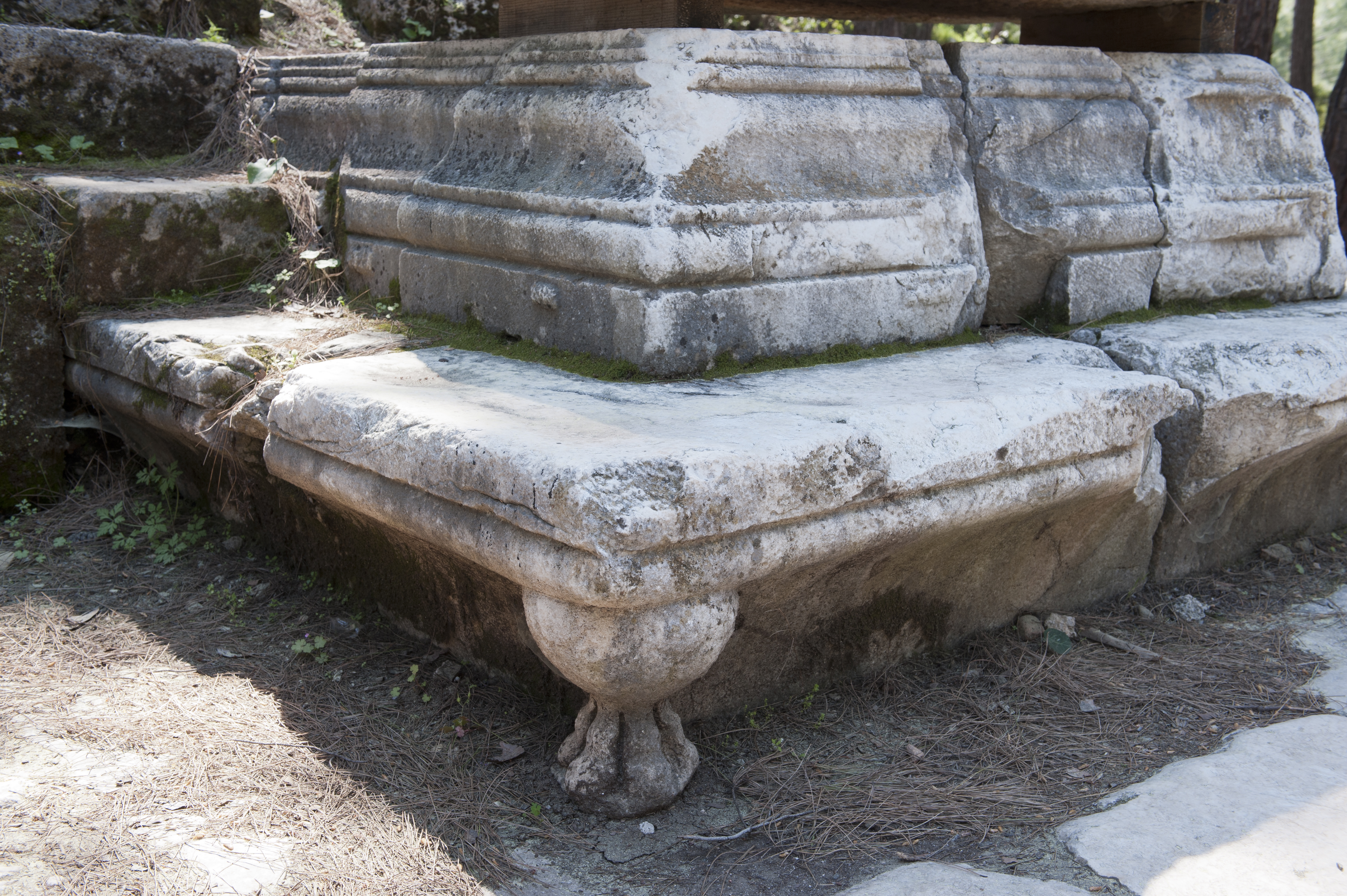
Phaselis Hadrian's Gate

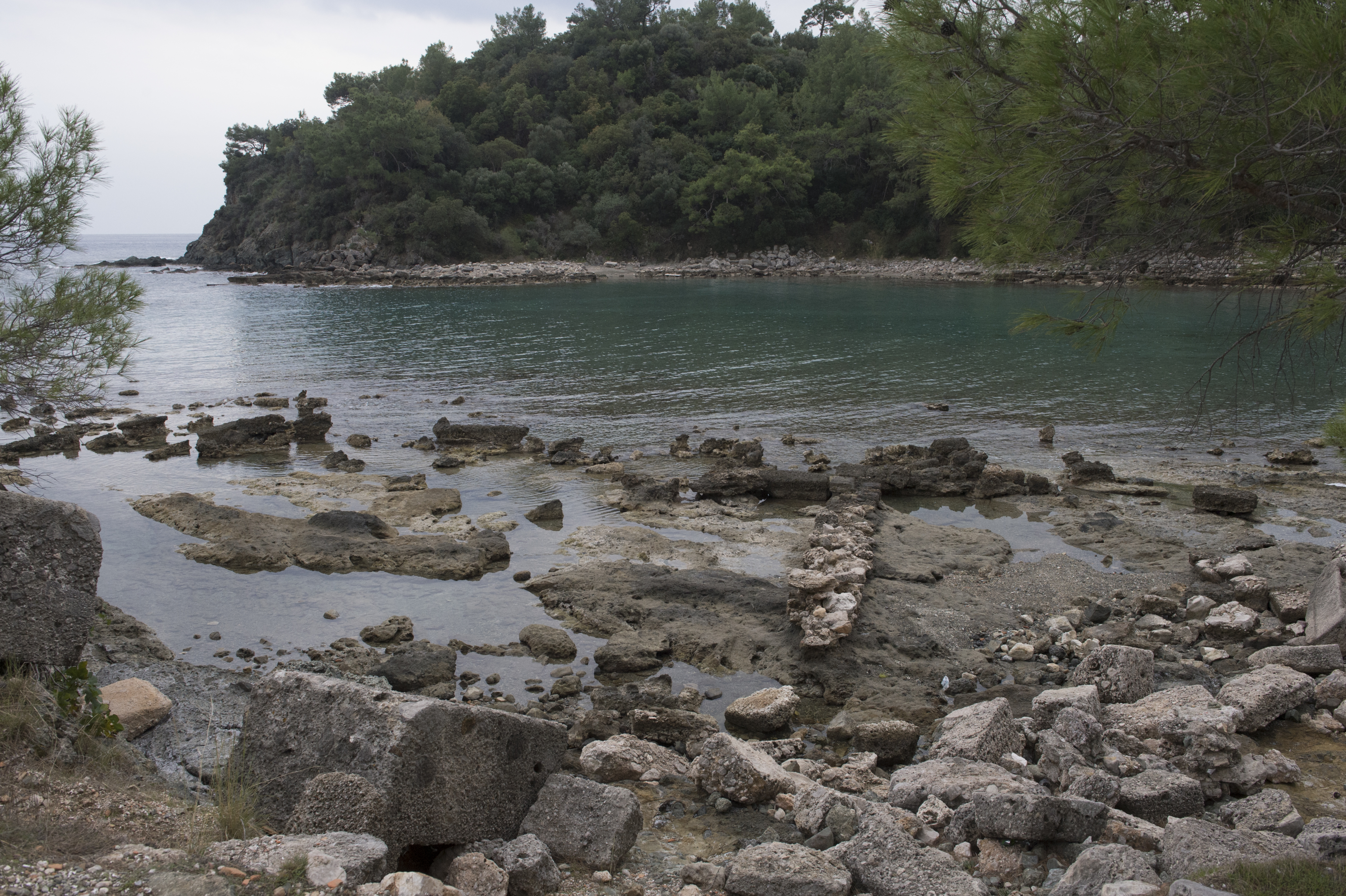
Phaselis North Harbour

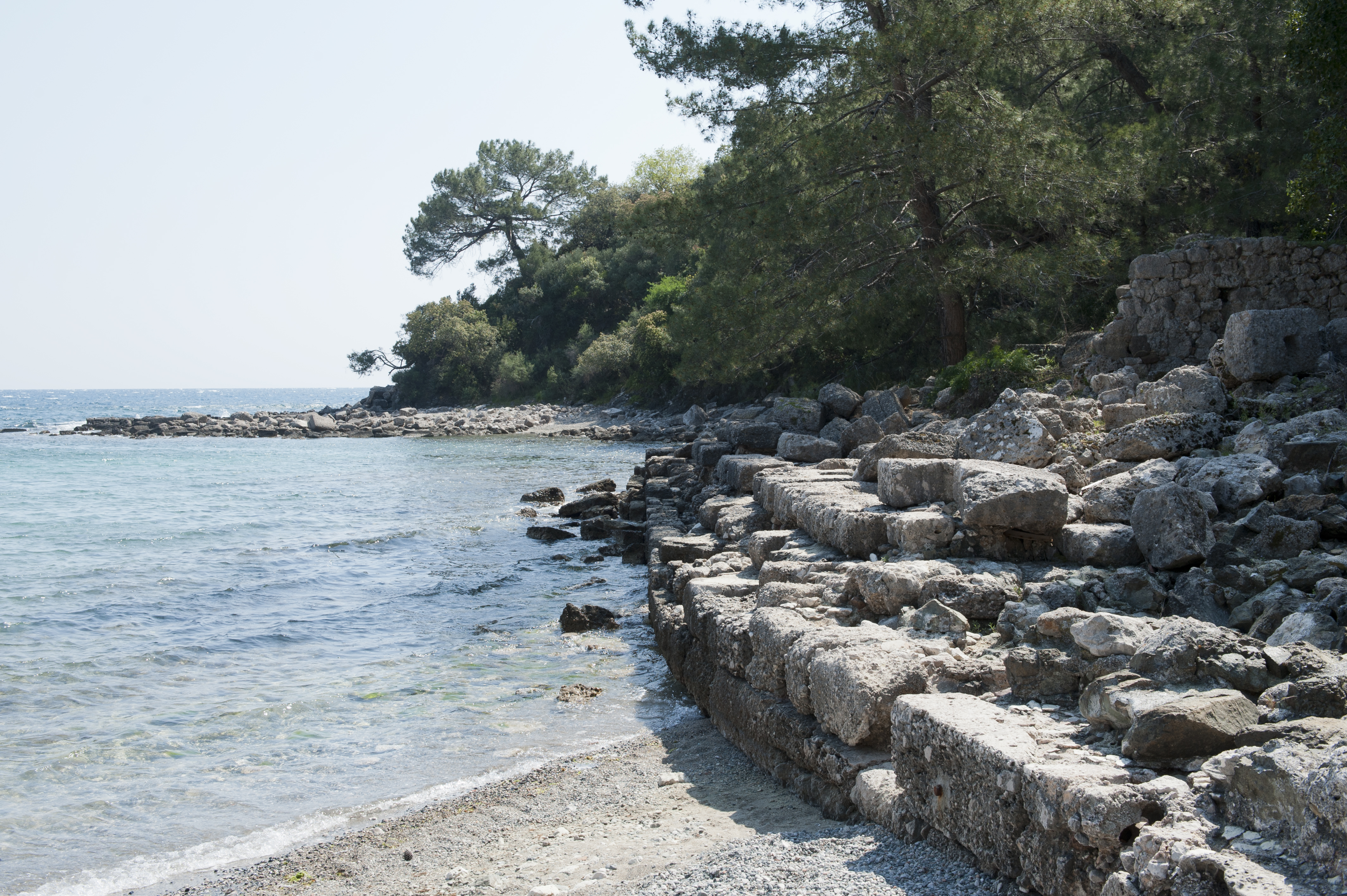
Phaselis North Harbour

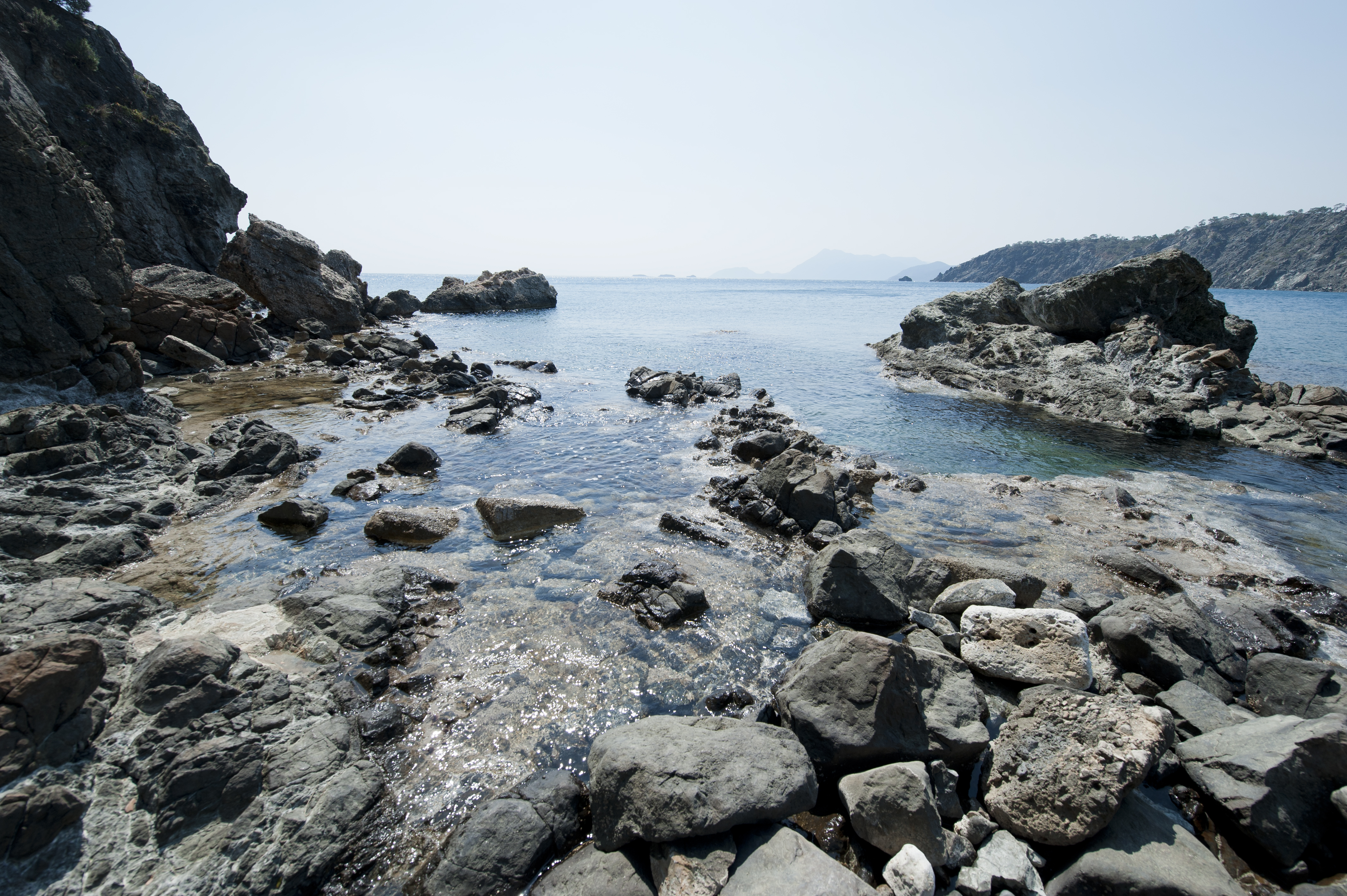
Phaselis South Harbour

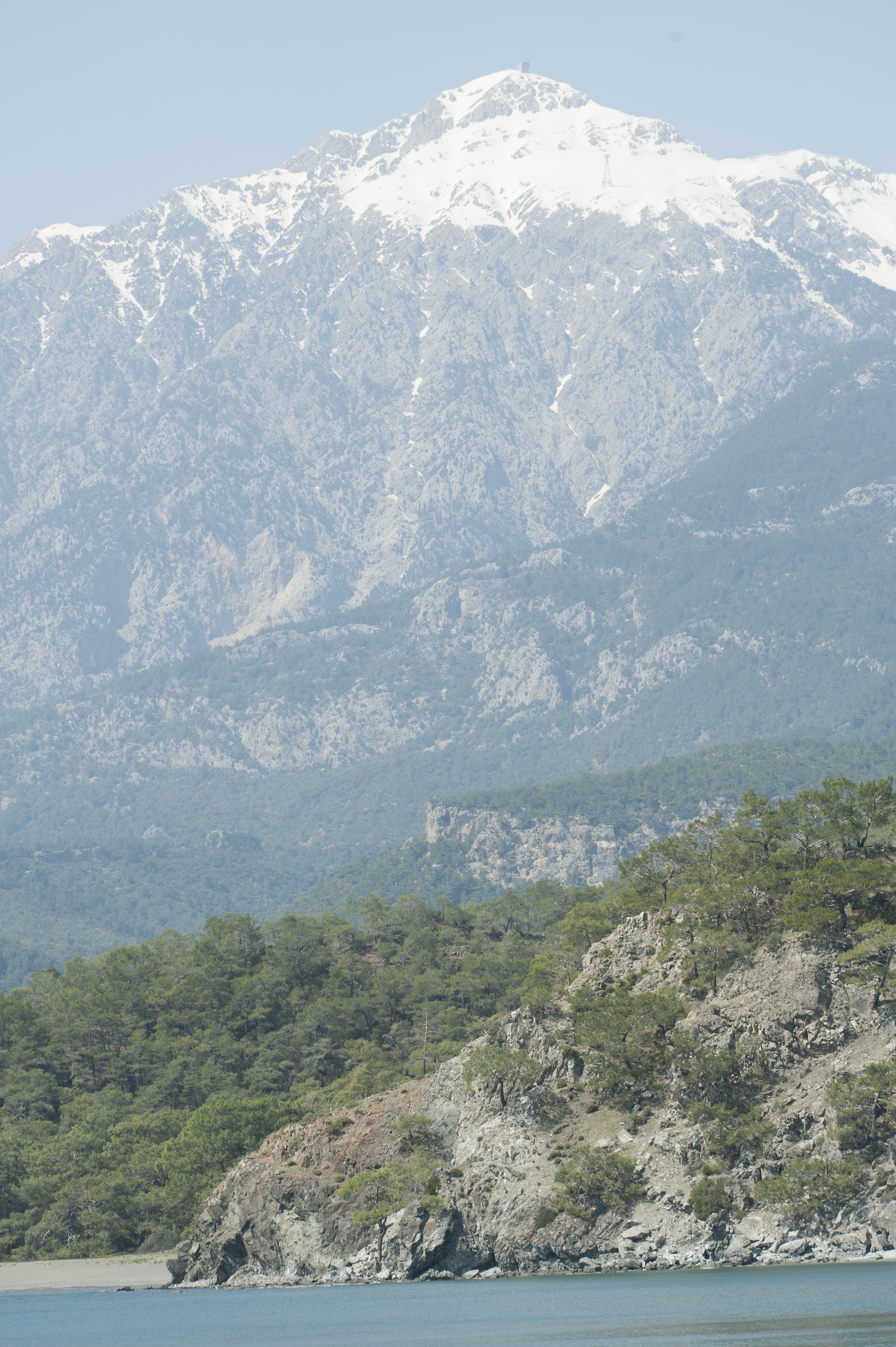
Phaselis View from South Harbour

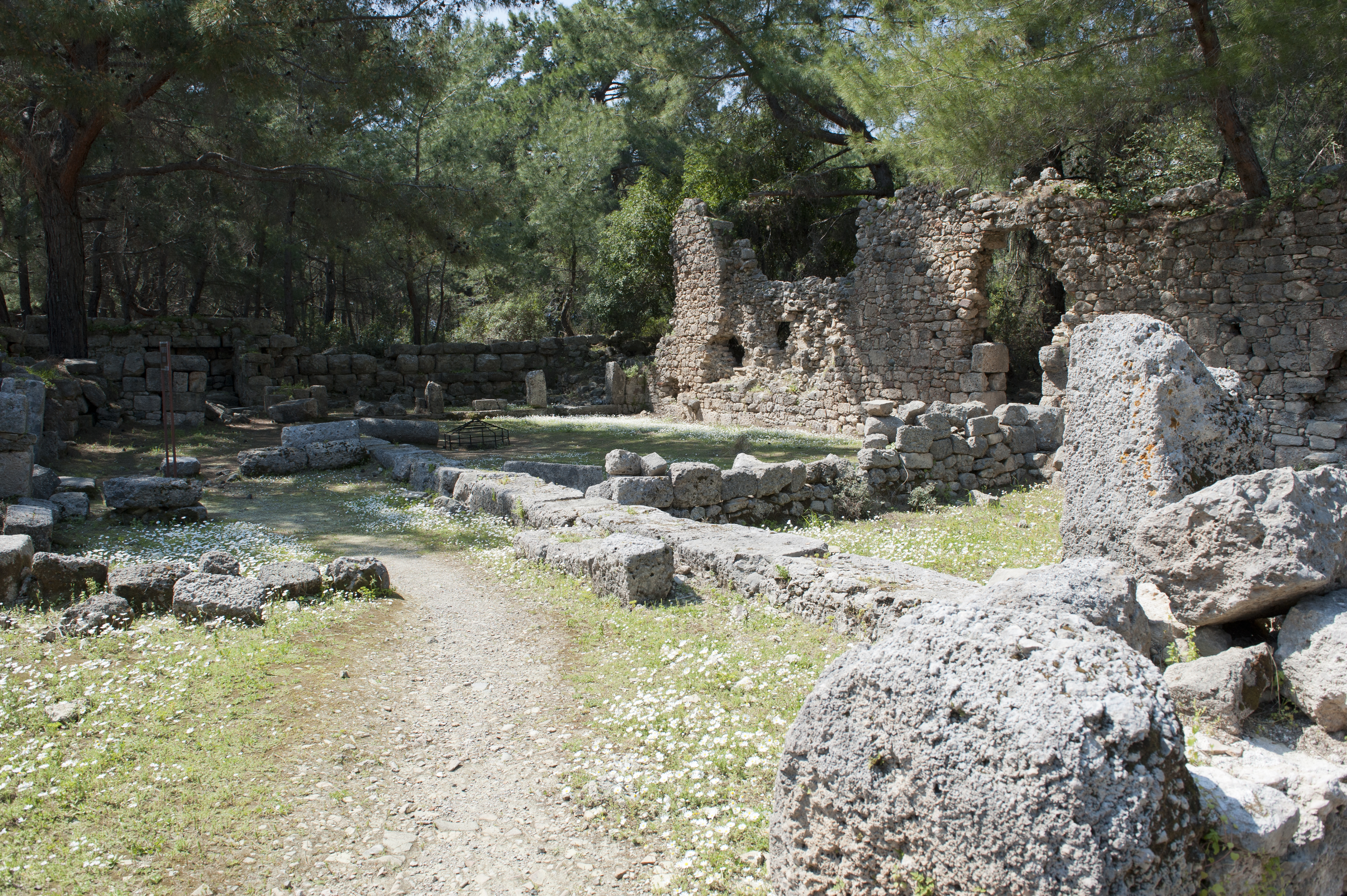
Phaselis Tetragonal Agora

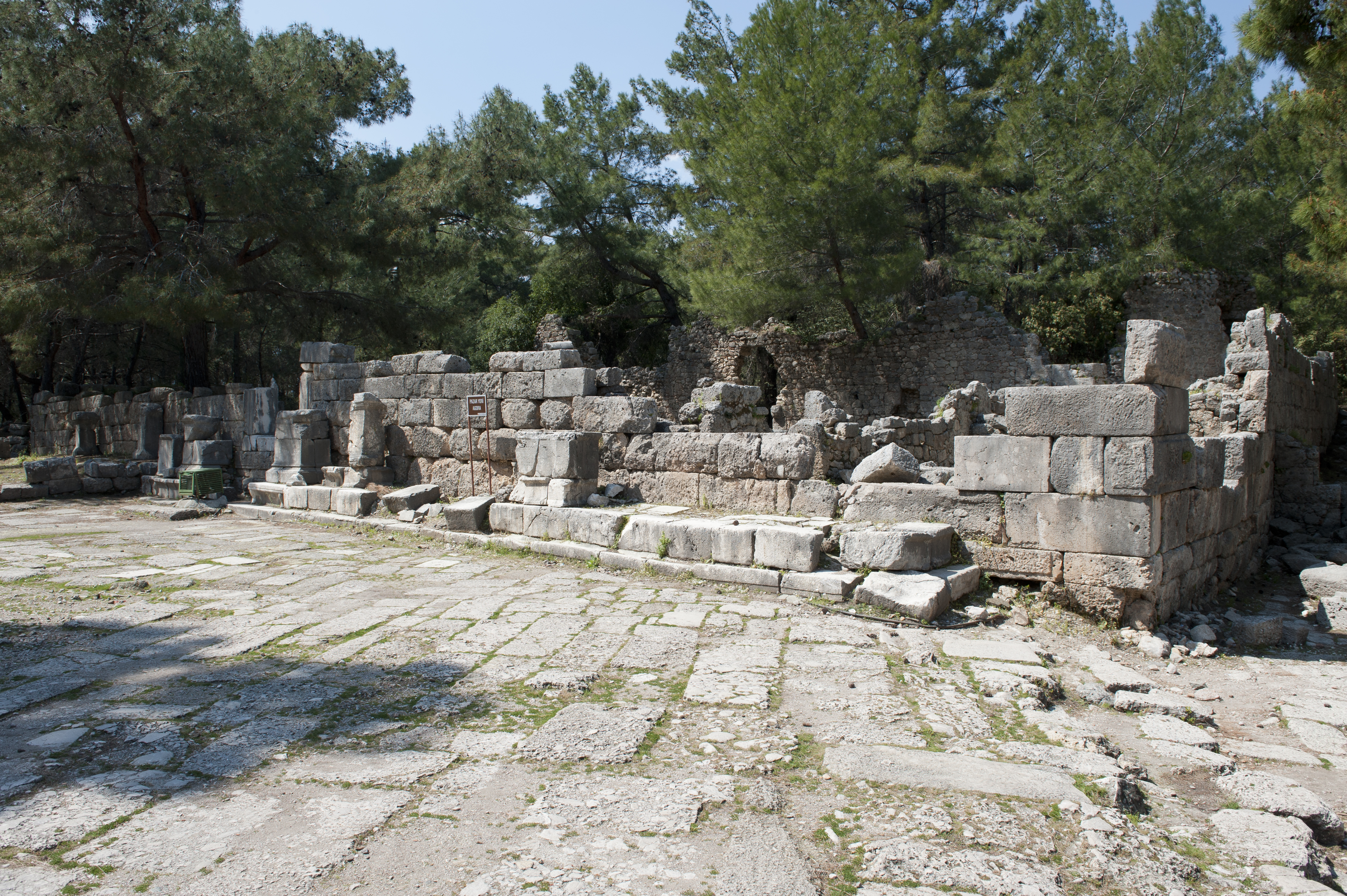
Phaselis Front Tetragonal agora

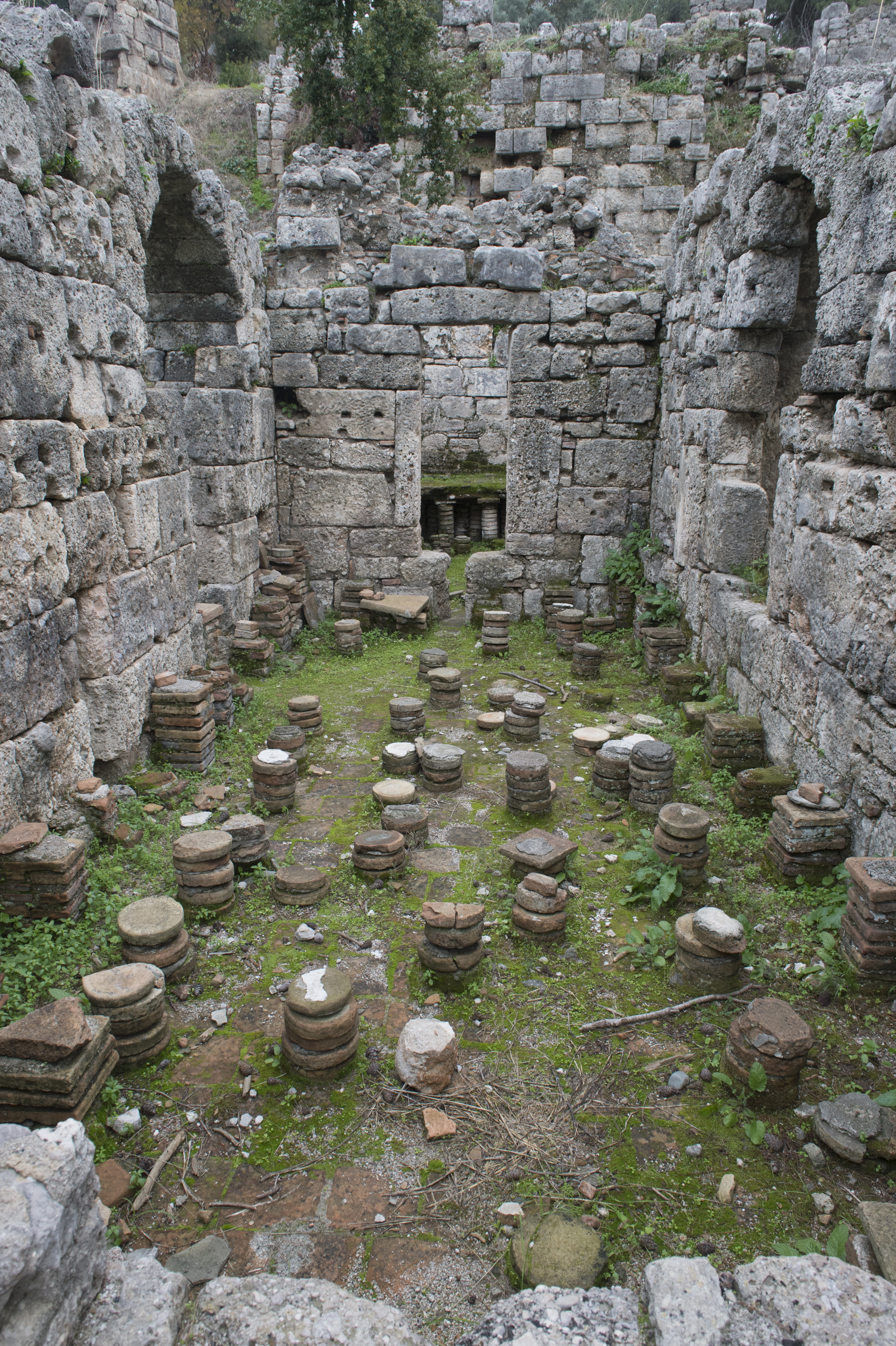
Phaselis Small Bath

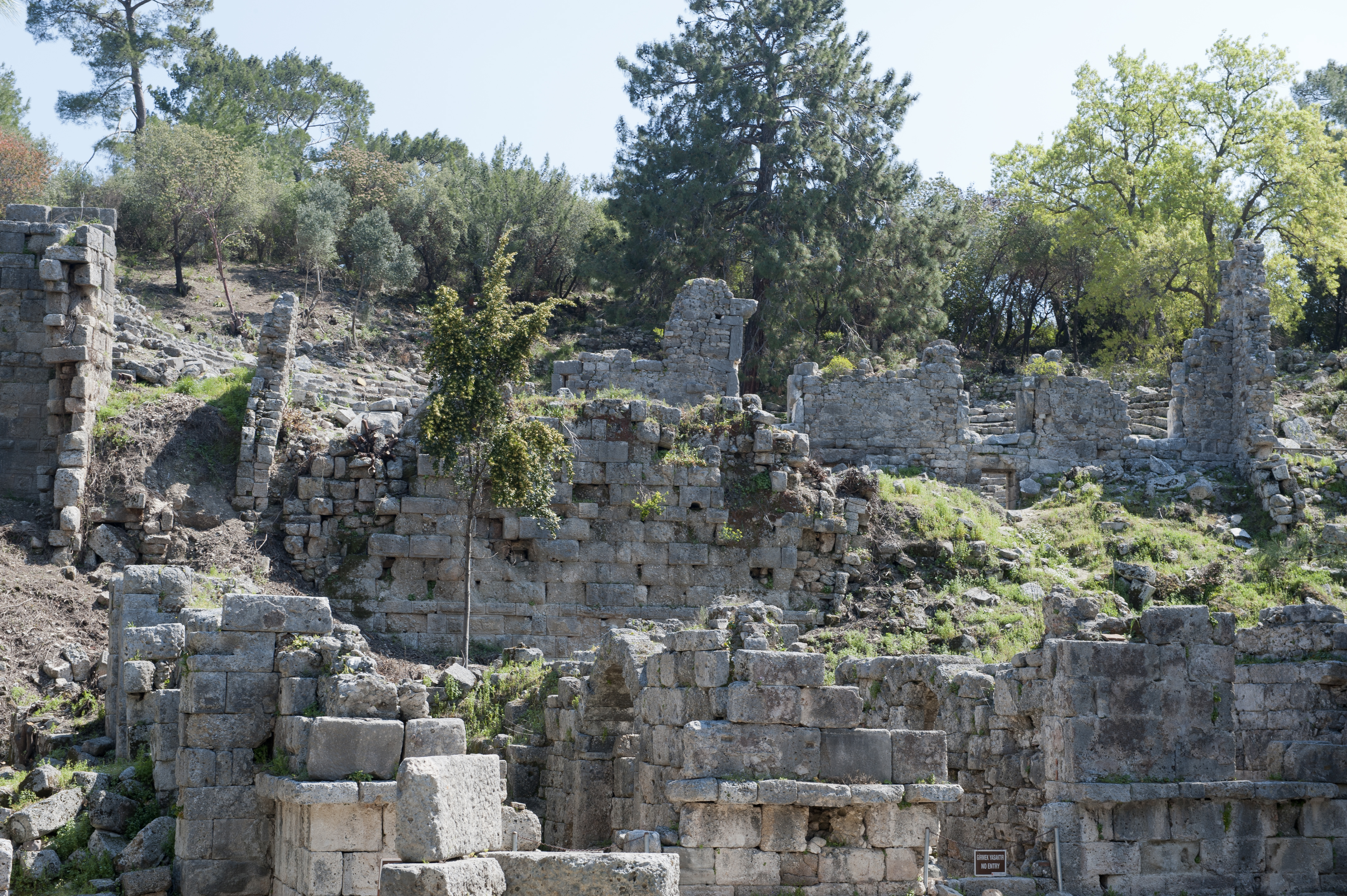
Phaselis Small Bath and Theatre

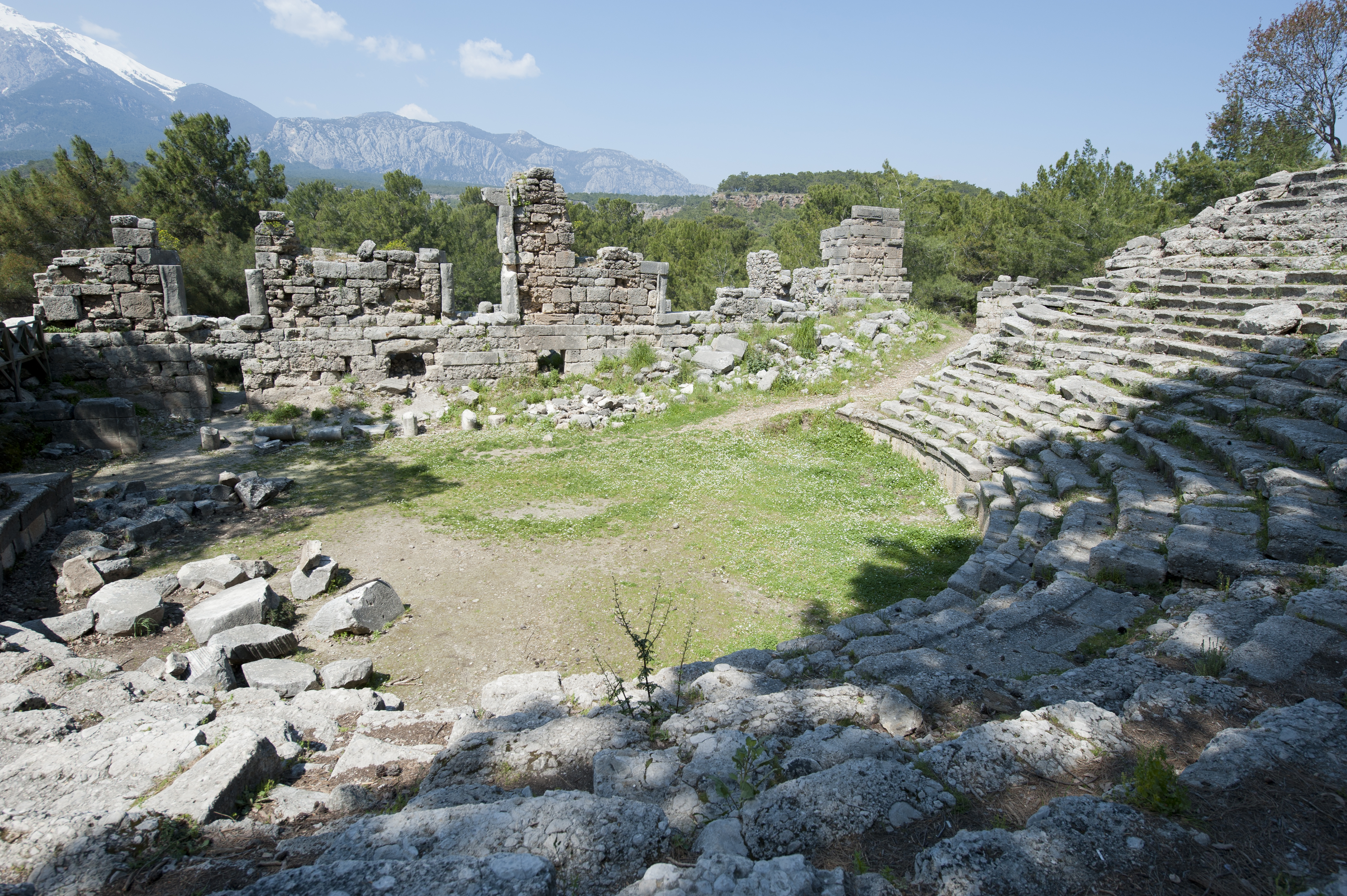
Phaselis Theatre

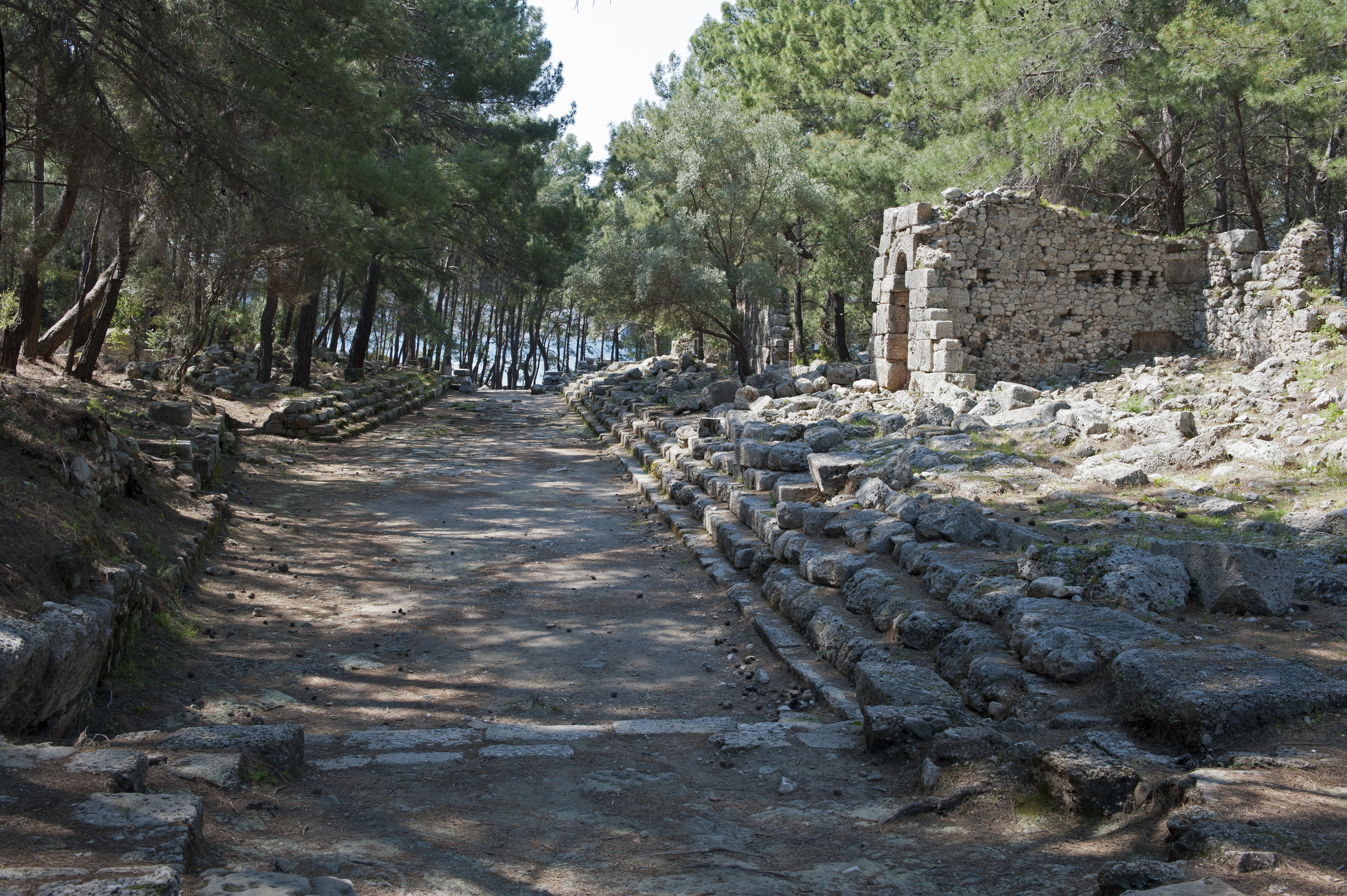
Phaselis Street along Domitian Agora

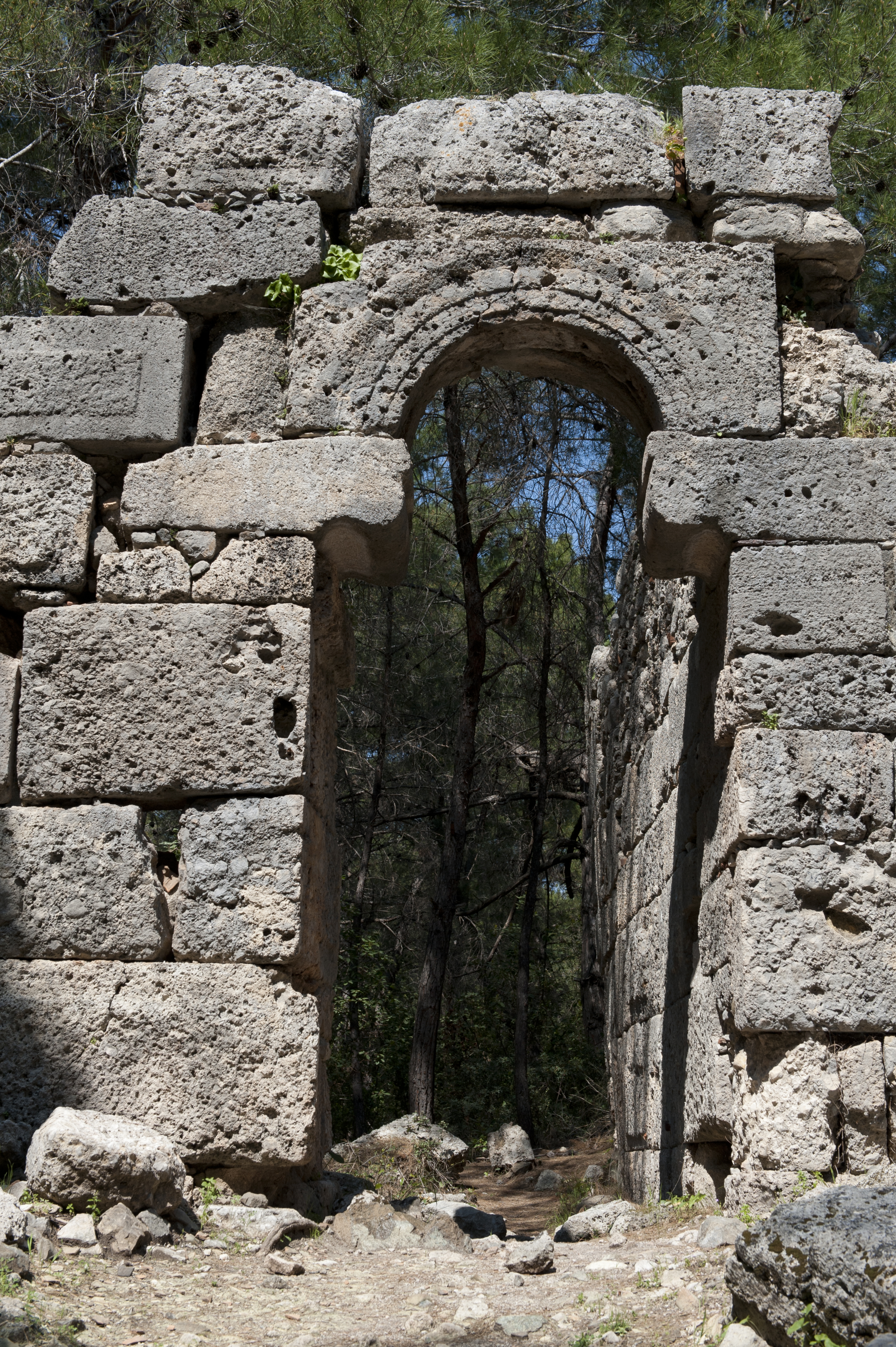
Phaselis Entrance Domitian Agora

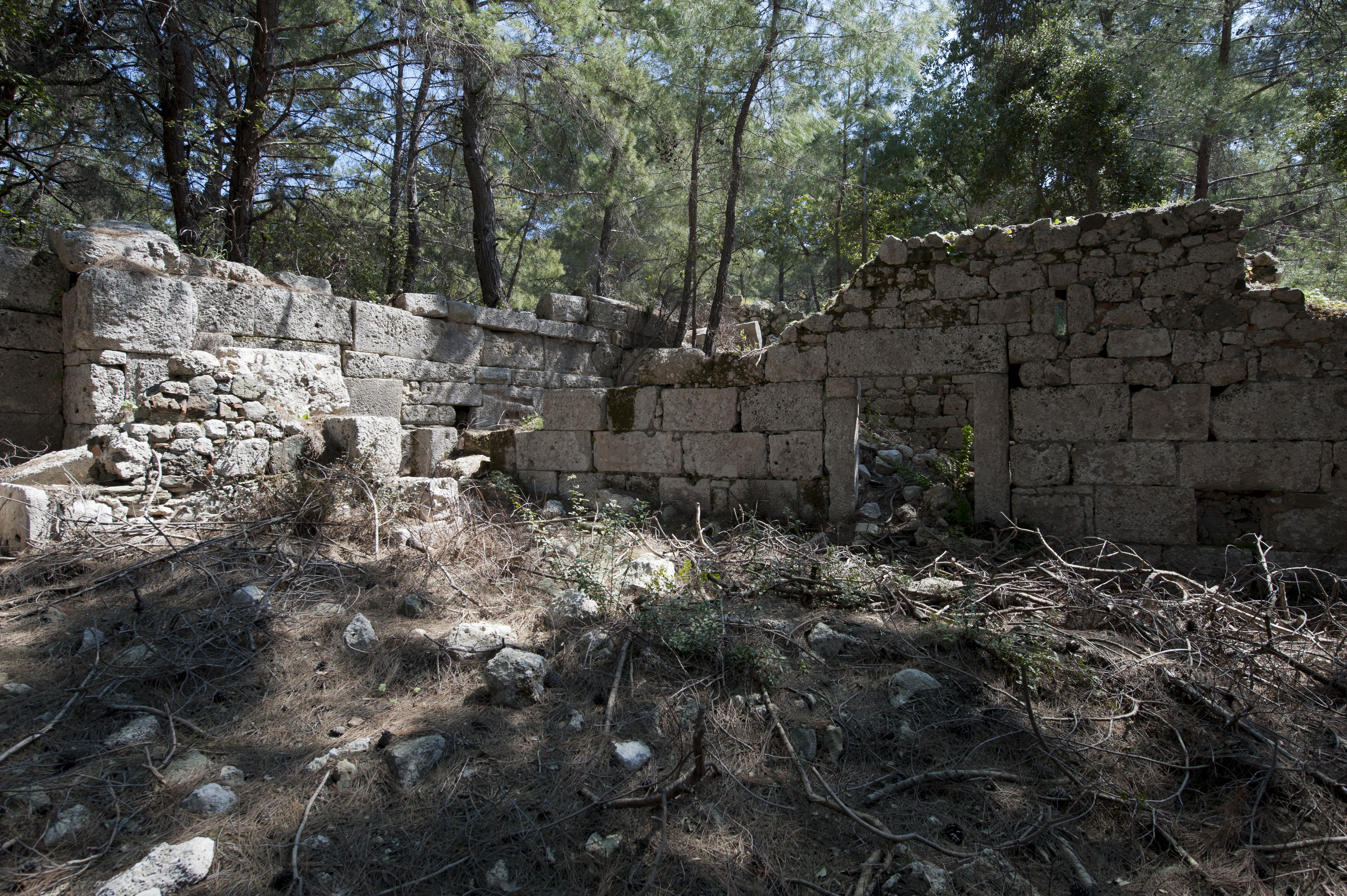
Phaselis Domitian Agora

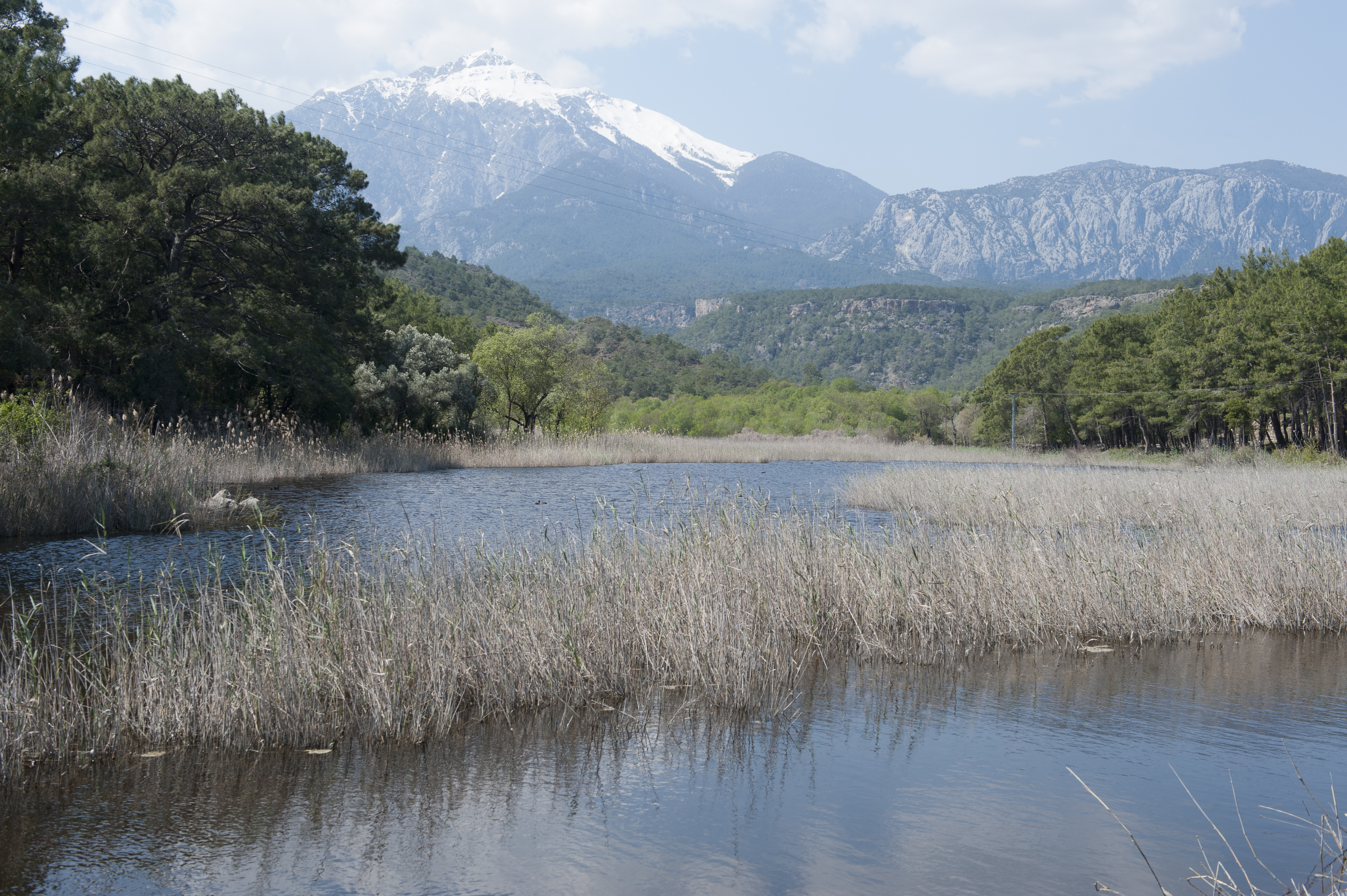
Phaselis March area

== See also ==
- List of ancient Greek cities
