= Theodectes =

4th-century BC Greek poet

Theodectes (Ancient Greek: Θεοδέκτης, romanized: Theodektes, lit. 'god-receiving'; c. 380 – c. 340 BC) was a Greek rhetorician and tragic poet, of Phaselis in Lycia.

== Life ==
He lived in the period which followed the Peloponnesian War. Along with the continual decay of political and religious life, tragedy sank more and more into mere rhetorical display. The school of Isocrates produced the orators and tragedians, Theodectes and Aphareus. He was also a pupil of Plato and an intimate friend of Aristotle. He at first wrote speeches for the law courts though he soon moved on to compose tragedies with success. He spent most of his life at Athens, and was buried on the sacred road to Eleusis. The inhabitants of Phaselis honored him with a statue, which was decorated with garlands by Alexander the Great on his way to the East.

He won the prize eight times, on one occasion with his tragedy, Mausolus, in the contest which the queen Artemisia of Caria had instituted in honor of her dead husband, Mausolus. On the same occasion he was defeated in rhetoric by Theopompus. Mausolus was especially adapted for recitations, and, from what the Suda says, it appears that the whole contest was one of declamation. A good idea of these dramas for reading and recitation, with their accompaniment of cold, rhetorical pathos and their strong leaning toward the horrible, may be gained by the plays of Seneca. Of the fifty tragedies of Theodectes we have the names of about thirteen (among them were Ajax, Alcmeon, Helen, Lynceus, Mausolus, Oedipus, Orestes, Tydeus, and Philoctetes) along with a few unimportant fragments. His treatise on the art of rhetoric (according to Suidas written in verse) and his speeches are lost. The names of two of the latter, Socrates and Nomos (referring to a law proposed by Theodectes for the reform of the mercenary service) are preserved by Aristotle (Rhetoric, ii. 23, 13, 17). The Theodectea (Θεοδέκτεια; Aristotle, Rhet. iii. 9, 9) was probably not by Theodectes, but an earlier work of Aristotle, which was superseded by the extant Rhetorica. Stobaeus quotes the following passage from an unknown tragedy of his (Snell fr. 12 = Stobaeus, Anthologium 3.32.14):

ἅπαντ' ἐν ἀνθρώποισι γηράσκειν ἔφυ
καὶ πρὸς τελευτὴν ἔρχεται τα<κ>τοῦ χρόνου,
πλὴν ὡς ἔοικε τῆς ἀναιδείας μόνον·
αὕτη δ' ὅσῳπερ αὔξεται θνητῶν γένος,
τοσῷδε μείζων γίγνεται καθ' ἡμέραν

It's fated for everything among mankind to grow old
and to approach the end of its allotted time
except, so it seems, wickedness alone:
as the race of mortals does increase,
by the same degree does wickedness day by day.

Sibyrtius (Σιβύρτιος) the rhetorician (who wrote rhetorical treatises) was oiketes (οἰκέτης, household slave) and anagnostes (ἀναγνώστης, a slave whose specific task was to read books out aloud for his or her master) of Theodectes.

== Mention by others ==
Historian Flavius Josephus writes that Theodectes once endeavored to mention the Jewish Law in his poems, and became blind because of his encroachment on the Holy will of God at the time. Therefore, being aware of the occasion of his distemperment, he prayed to God and was healed. At the end of his discourse on memory-theory, Quintilian mentions that Theodectes had an excellent memory, and was able to repeat numerous verses that he had only heard once. Athenaeus describes Theodectes as having subdued Aristotle by means of his beauty.
