= Aphareus (writer) =

Aphareus (4th century BC) was an ancient Greek tragedian and orator. He attended the school of Isocrates, along with Theodectes. He was the son of Hippias the sophist, and the adopted son of Isocrates, left behind him thirty-seven tragedies, and had been successful in winning four victories. None of his works have been found whole.
