= Lacritus =

Ancient Greek tutor

Lacritus (Ancient Greek: Λάκριτος) was a sophist, and native of Phaselis, known to us chiefly from the speech of Demosthenes against him, and for having been the tutor of Archias of Thurii.

The subject of the speech entails a man named Androcles, who had lent a sum of money to Artemo, the brother of Lacritus. The latter, on the death of his brother, refused to refund the money, though he had become security for his brother, and was his heir. Hence, the suit instituted against him by Androcles, for whom Demosthenes composed the speech in question. Lacritus was a pupil of Isocrates, of which he seems to have been rather vain. speaks of him likewise as the author of some Athenian laws.
