= Archias of Thurii =

4th-century BC Greek actor and official

Archias (Ancient Greek: Ἀρχίας) of Thurii in Magna Graecia was an actor turned military agent of the Macedonian general Antipater in the 4th century BCE in ancient Greece. He was nicknamed "the hunter of the exiles" (φυγαδοθήρας).

== History ==
Archias was originally trained as a rhetor under Anaximenes of Lampsacus and Lacritus before becoming an actor. In his career as a tragic actor, he was said to have achieved some renown, performing in Athens and elsewhere. Plutarch mentions him as having been the mentor of the great actor Polus of Aegina, as well as having once won the Lenaia around 330, despite being, as far as Athens was concerned, a "foreigner."

Archias is more known to history as a servant of the Macedonian statesman Antipater, probably for money. He was not an Athenian, but neither was he a Macedonian, and seemed to have no affiliation with any political parties, so later historians have assumed his motivations to have been mercenary in nature. Archias was sent in 322, after the Battle of Crannon, to apprehend the anti-Macedonian orators whom Antipater had demanded of the Athenians, and who had fled from Athens. Archias seized Hypereides, Aristonicus of Marathon, and Himeraeus, and had them dragged from the sanctuary of Aeacus in Aegina, and transported to Cleonae in Argolis, where they were executed.

Archias also apprehended the renowned Greek statesman and orator Demosthenes in the temple of Poseidon in Calaureia, leading to Demosthenes's suicide after a memorable exchange recorded by Plutarch.

An otherwise unknown "Archias" is mentioned by Arrian as having escorted Antipater's daughter Nicaea of Macedon to Asia around 322, whom some scholars (such as Karl Julius Beloch) identify with Archias of Thurii.

Archias's fortunes at some point afterward took a downward turn. He eventually died of hunger, ending his life in great poverty and disgrace.
