= Demetrius of Phalerum =

Greek statesman and philosopher (c.350–c.280 BC)

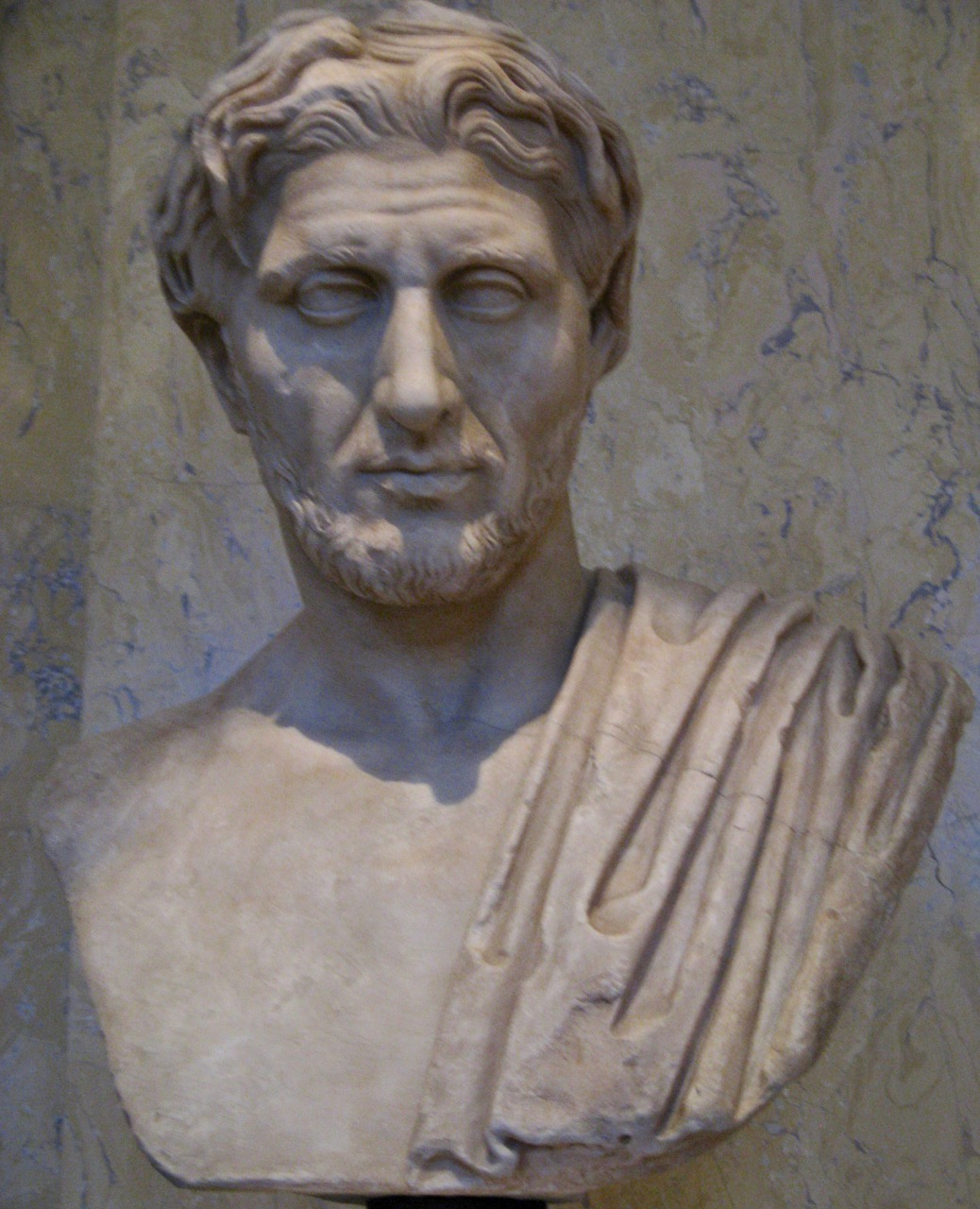
Roman bust of Demetrius, c. 1st century BC, after a Greek original

Demetrius of Phalerum (also Demetrius of Phaleron or Demetrius Phalereus; Ancient Greek: Δημήτριος ὁ Φαληρεύς; c. 350 – c. 280 BC) was an Athenian orator originally from Phalerum, an ancient port of Athens. A student of Theophrastus, and perhaps of Aristotle, he was one of the first members of the Peripatetic school of philosophy. Demetrius had been a distinguished statesman who was appointed by Cassander, the King of Macedon, to govern Athens, where Demetrius ruled as sole ruler for ten years. During this time, he introduced important reforms of the legal system, while also maintaining pro-Cassander oligarchic rule.

Demetrius was exiled by his enemies in 307 BC. He first went to Thebes, and then, after 297 BC, went to the court of Alexandria. He wrote extensively on the subjects of history, rhetoric, and literary criticism. He is not to be confused with his grandson, also called Demetrius of Phaleron, who probably served as regent of Athens between 262 and 255, on behalf of the Macedonian King Antigonos Gonatas.

== Life ==
Demetrius was born in Phalerum, c. 350 BC. He was the son of Phanostratus, a man without rank or property, and was brother to the anti-Macedonian orator Himeraeus. He was educated, together with the poet Menander, in the school of Theophrastus. He began his public career about 325 BC, at the time of the disputes concerning Harpalus, and soon acquired a great reputation by the talent he displayed in public speaking. He belonged to the pro-oligarchic party of Phocion, and he acted in the spirit of that statesman. When Xenocrates was unable to pay the new tax on metics (foreign residents) c. 322 BC, and the Athenians threatened him with slavery, he was only saved (according to one story) when Demetrius purchased his debt and paid his tax. After the death of Phocion in 317 BC, Cassander placed Demetrius at the head of the administration of Athens. He filled this office for ten years, instituting extensive legal reforms. One famous innovation implemented by Demetrius was the restriction of funerary luxury via a sumptuary law, which is not only known from a mention in Cicero, but is also clearly visible in the archaeologically documented cemeteries of Athens.

The Athenians conferred upon him the most extraordinary distinctions (almost all of which were revoked after his later expulsion from Athens), and no fewer than 360 statues were erected to him. However, Demetrius was unpopular with the lower classes of Athenians and with pro-democratic political factions, who resented the limitations he placed on the democratic franchise and viewed him as little more than a pro-Macedonian puppet ruler.

According to Stephen V. Tracy, the story about the statues was not historical; also he argues that Demetrius later played a big role in the foundation of the Library of Alexandria.

He remained in power until 307 BC when Cassander's enemy, Demetrius Poliorcetes, captured Athens, and Demetrius was obliged to take to flight. It was claimed that during the latter period of his administration he had abandoned himself to every kind of excess, and we are told he squandered 1200 talents a year on dinners, parties, and love affairs. Carystius of Pergamum mentions that he had a lover by the name of Theognis, of whom all the Athenian boys were jealous. After his exile, his enemies contrived to induce the people of Athens to pass the death sentence upon him, in consequence of which his friend Menander nearly fell victim. All his statues, with the exception of one, were demolished.

Demetrius first went to Thebes, and then (after Cassander's death in 297 BC) to the court of Ptolemy I Soter at Alexandria, with whom he lived for many years on the best terms, and who is even said to have entrusted to him the revision of the laws of his kingdom. During his stay at Alexandria, he devoted himself mainly to literary pursuits, ever cherishing the recollection of his own country.

On the accession of Ptolemy Philadelphus, Demetrius fell into disfavour (he apparently supported the wrong candidate, Ptolemy Keraunos), and was sent into exile to Upper Egypt. According to one account, a statue at Memphis Saqqara was attributed to him. He is said to have died from the bite of a venomous snake and was buried in Diospolis Kato. His death appears to have taken place soon after the year 283 BC.

== Works and legacy ==
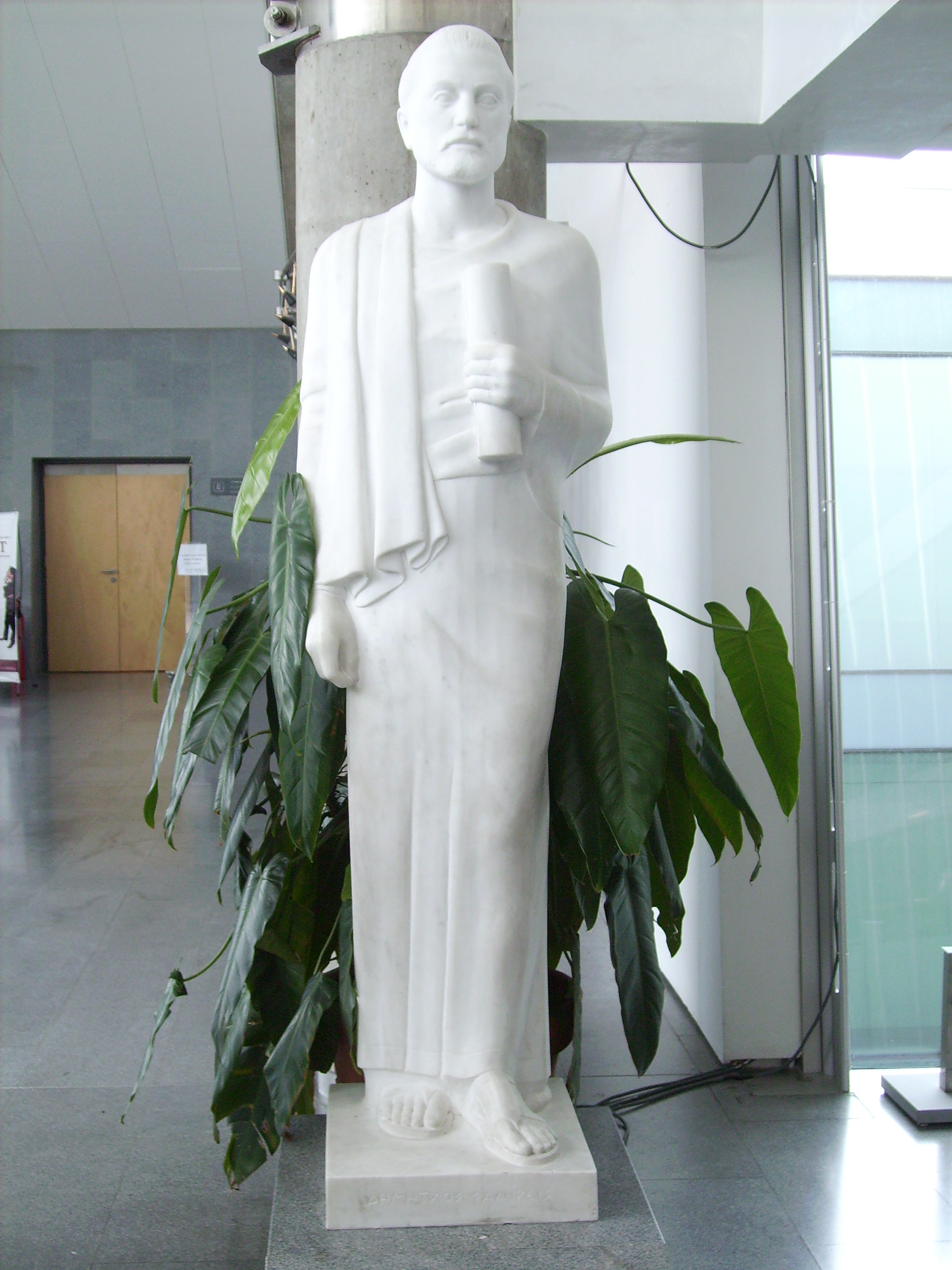
Statue of Demetrius at the entrance of the Bibliotheca Alexandrina

=== Literary works ===
Demetrius was the last among the Attic orators worthy of the name, after which the activity went into a decline. His orations were characterised as being soft, graceful, and elegant, rather than sublime like those of Demosthenes. His numerous writings, the greater part of which he probably composed during his residence in Egypt, embraced a wide range of subjects, and the list of them given by Diogenes Laërtius shows that he was a man of the most extensive acquirements. These works, which were partly historical, partly political, partly philosophical (such as Aisopeia, a collection of Aesopic Fables), and partly poetical, have all perished. The work On Style (Περὶ ἑρμηνείας) which has come down under his name, may be the work of a later writer.

=== Education and arts ===
The performance of tragedy had fallen into disuse in Athens, on account of the great expense involved. In order to afford the people less costly and yet intellectual amusement, he caused the Homeric and other poems to be recited on the stage by rhapsodists.

According to Strabo, Demetrius inspired the creation of the Mouseion, the location of the Library of Alexandria, which was modelled after the arrangement of Aristotle's school. The Mouseion contained a peripatos (covered walkway), a syssition (room for communal dining) and a categorized organization of scrolls.

According to the earliest source of information, the pseudepigraphic Letter of Aristeas composed between c. 180 – c. 145 BC, the library was initially organized by Demetrius of Phaleron, under the reign of Ptolemy I Soter (c. 367 – c. 283 BC). Other sources claim it was instead created under the reign of his son Ptolemy II (283–246 BC).

== Cultural references ==
=== Diogenes Laërtius ===
Diogenes Laërtius devotes a section of his The Lives and Opinions of Eminent Philosophers to Demetrius Phalereus.

=== Hegel ===
Georg Wilhelm Friedrich Hegel, in the Lectures on the History of Philosophy, says of Demetrius Phalereus that "Demetrius Phalereus and others were thus soon after [Alexander] honoured and worshipped in Athens as God." What the exact source was for Hegel's claim is unclear. Diogenes Laërtius does not mention this.

Apparently, Hegel's error comes from a misreading of Plutarch's Life of Demetrius which is about Demetrius Poliorcetes and not Demetrius Phalereus. But Plutarch describes in the work how Demetrius Poliorcetes conquered Demetrius Phalereus at Athens. Then, in chapter 12 of the work, Plutarch describes how Demetrius Poliorcetes was given honours due to the god Dionysus. Somehow this account by Plutarch was confusing not only for Hegel but for others as well.
