= Polis (journalism think tank) =

London School of Economics research forum

Polis is the journalism think tank at the Media and Communications Department of the London School of Economics and Political Science. It was founded in 2006 by Charlie Beckett, a journalist with 20 years experience at the BBC and ITN’s Channel 4 News. He is the author of SuperMedia: Saving Journalism So It Can Save The World (Blackwell, 2008).

== Objectives and commitments ==
Polis is aimed at working journalists, people in public life and students in the UK and around the world. It is a forum for public debate on key issues of journalism. It also produces interdisciplinary research on the circulation and production of news, as well as the impact of journalism in today’s societies. Polis examines journalism from a historical, political and ethical scope, bridging the applied with the theoretical.

== Events ==
Polis regularly invites distinguished speakers to discuss a great variety of topics. Previous guests include Jeremy Hunt MP (Secretary of State at DCMS), Sir Michael Lyons (Chairman of the BBC Trust) and Alec J Ross (Innovation Advisor to Hillary Clinton). A weekly series of lectures titled Media Agenda Talks also takes place during the Michaelmas term, from October to January. The lectures are attended by the students of the university, as well as members of the public. The guests present their views on media-related issues, such as popular culture, political communication and media in the developing world.

Polis holds its annual conference on journalism each April. In 2010 it focused on the idea of Networked Journalism. In 2011 it examined issues around media and power.

== Research ==
Polis has supported a variety of publications and projects.

Previous publications include "The Value of Networked Journalism" (Report by Charlie Beckett published at the Polis/BBC College of Journalism conference on 11 June 2010), "'Digital Natives': A Myth?" (Report of the panel held at the London School of Economics and Political Science, on 24 November 2009, edited by Polis Silverstone Scholar Ranjana Das and Charlie Beckett), "The Aestheticization of Suffering on Television" (Article by Professor Chouliaraki in Visual Communication, October 2006, volume 5, no. 3 261-285), "Children's Media: More Harm than Good?" (Lecture on the impact of children's media by Professor Sonia Livingstone). Charlie Beckett’s book SuperMedia (Wiley-Blackwell: 2008) argues on the influence of journalism in democratic societies, as well as the challenges faced by the media professionals.

== Summer school ==
Polis offers the course ‘International Journalism and Society - The Role of the Media in the Modern World’ as part of the LSE Summer School. The course is taught by Charlie Beckett and professors from the LSE Media and Communications Department. Leading media practitioners also offer their input in a series of lectures. A great variety of topical journalism issues are covered in the course, including the use of new media. In addition, emphasis is put on the global nature of news. The course attracts journalists, NGO workers, government communication officers and international students.

== Internships ==
Polis offers a range of internships for the university’s students. The internships are flexible and aim at contributing positively to the students’ studies and career prospects. They include administrative tasks, new media production, fund-raising, reporting, event organization and research.

== Online activity ==
Polis has an online presence including a website, newsletter and Facebook page, offering updates on its activities, as well as reports on current events from the media perspective. The Polis YouTube Channel hosts videos with event coverage and interviews. Charlie Beckett’s blog comprises commentaries on international journalism, media and society.

In February 2011, the director was listed at number 60 in The Independent's Twitter 100 list of the UK’s top Twitter users.
