= Polis (surname) =

- Aivars Polis (born 1972), Latvian luger
- Carol Polis, American writer and boxer judge
- Gary Allan Polis (1946–2000), American arachnologist
- Greg Polis (1950-2018), Canadian ice hockey player
- Jānis Polis (1938–2011), Soviet and Latvian pharmacologist
- Jānis Polis (wrestler) (1893-1953), Latvian wrestler
- Jared Polis (born 1975), Colorado politician and entrepreneur
- Joel Polis (born 1951), American actor
- John St. Polis (1873-1946), American actor
- Miervaldis Polis (1948–2026), Latvian artist
- Susan Polis Schutz (born 1944), American poet, film-maker, and businesswoman
