= Tomas Polus =

Swedish statesman and diplomat

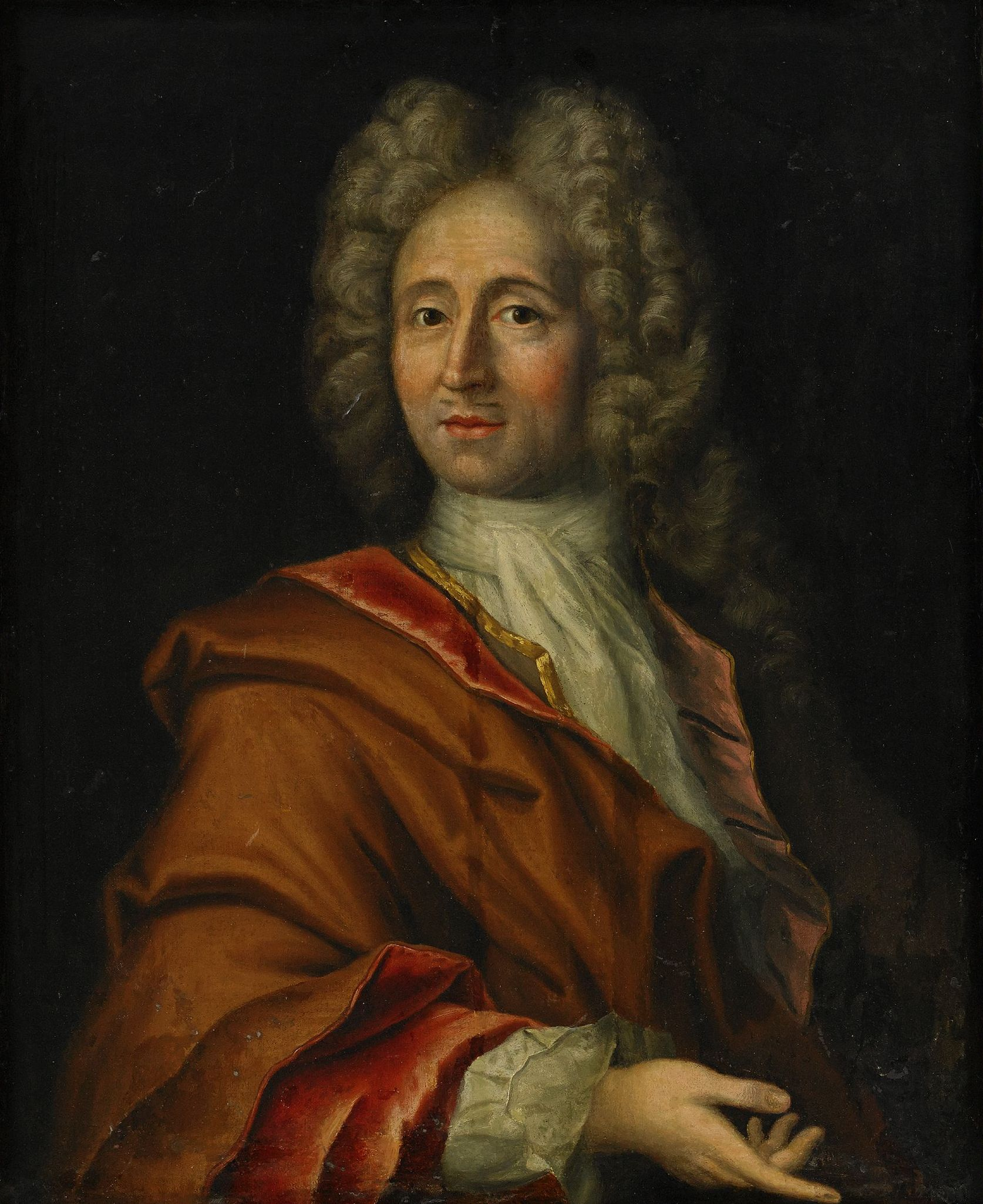
- Portrait by Lucas von Breda
- Born: 1634; Reval
- Died: 24 March 1708 (aged 73–74); Stockholm
- Occupations: Statesman, diplomat, and counsellor to the Queen

Count Tomas Polus (1634 – 24 March 1708) was a Swedish statesman and diplomat, and a counsellor to Queen Hedvig Eleonora from 1671.

Polus was ennobled in 1673, and became teacher of the young prince Karl (later King Charles XII of Sweden). He was secretary of state (foreign affairs) from 1697, and was appointed count in 1698.

Solna Church in Stockholm has a memorial to Polus, constructed on the orders of Queen Ulrika Eleonora.
