= Polus of Aegina =

Ancient Greek actor

- Πῶλος
- Born: Aegina, Ancient Greece
- Occupation: Tragic actor
- Known for: Acting in eight tragedies at age 70, performing in Electra holding the ashes of his own son
- Parent: Charicles of Sunium

Polus (Ancient Greek: Πῶλος) of Aegina was a celebrated tragic actor, the son of Charicles of Sunium, and a disciple of Archias of Thurii.

It is related of him that at the age of 70, shortly before his death, he acted in eight tragedies on four successive days.

The Roman author Aulus Gellius also mentions the actor, describing how during a performance of Electra, in the scene where Orestes is mourned with his ashes, Polus starred while holding an urn containing the ashes of his own son.
