= Oasis Polis =

Coordinates: 28°21′N 28°54′E

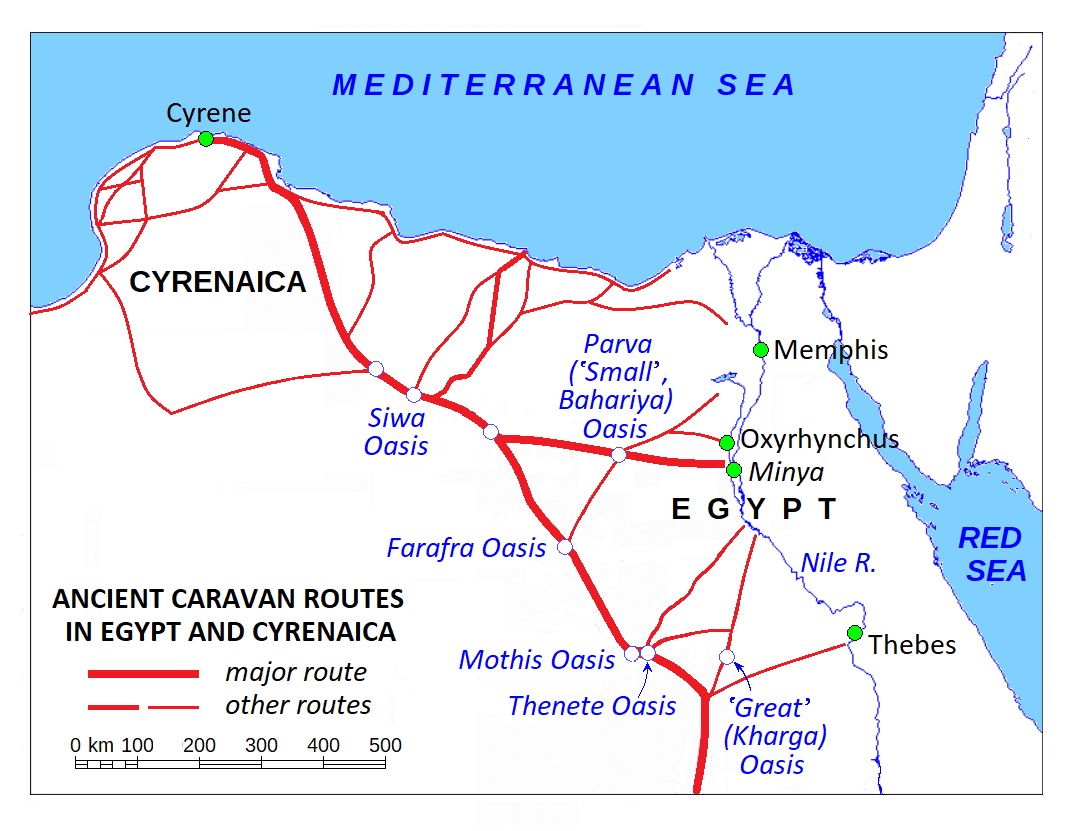
Map showing ancient caravan routes between Egypt and Cyrenaica. Oasis Polis is probably to be identified with the Small Oasis.

Oasis Polis (Greek: Ὄασις Πόλις; literally “Oasis City”) is said by Herodotus (Histories, III.26.1-3) to be an ancient Greek colony from Samos in the Egyptian Desert.

The oasis that would fit in with Herodotus's story here (the conquest of Egypt by Persian king Cambyses II in 525 BCE) is the so-called Small or Bahariya Oasis. Herodotus is describing a military campaign from Thebes via "Oasis Polis" westward towards the "Ammonians" (Ἀμμώνιοι, i.e. the Amun sanctuary at the Siwa Oasis). An oasis due west from Thebes and at the appropriate distance from Thebes of "a seven days' journey" is the Great or Kharga Oasis, and this Great Oasis apparently is the oasis that Herodotus had in mind. However, the usual route from Egypt to the Siwa Oasis was via the so-called Small Oasis; a route via the Great Oasis would be an improbable detour through inhospitable desert terrain. Herodotus's report has therefore been characterized as "hopelessly confused", confusing the Great and Small oases.

Though it might a priori be considered extremely improbable for a desert oasis to be colonized by seafarers from the island of Samos, the link is taken serious by modern historians. There certainly were many Greek communities in Egypt at the time, especially Ionians (among them Samians) and Carians, for example as mercenaries or traders. In particular, the Samian tribe that Herodotus mentions as living in Oasis Polis, the Aeschrionians (“τῆς Αἰσχριωνίης φυλῆς”), bear a name that is also known from Samos (Αἰσχρίων, Aeschrion).

The Siwa Oasis was a famous oracle site of the Egyptian god Amun. In the 7th or 6th century BCE the cult of this Amun became established in the Greek colony of Cyrene, where Amun was equated with the Greek god Zeus ("Zeus Ammon"). Samians were prominently present in ancient Cyrene, so they might be the missing link who brought the cult of Amun to Cyrene—a major caravan route led from Minya on the Nile via Siwa to the West, where it reached the sea at Cyrene. This route came in use ca. 650 BC, that is, at the same time as or slightly before the foundation of Cyrene in 632/1 BCE.
