= Bjernede Church =

Coordinates: 55°27′43″N 11°37′30″E

- Bjernede Kirke
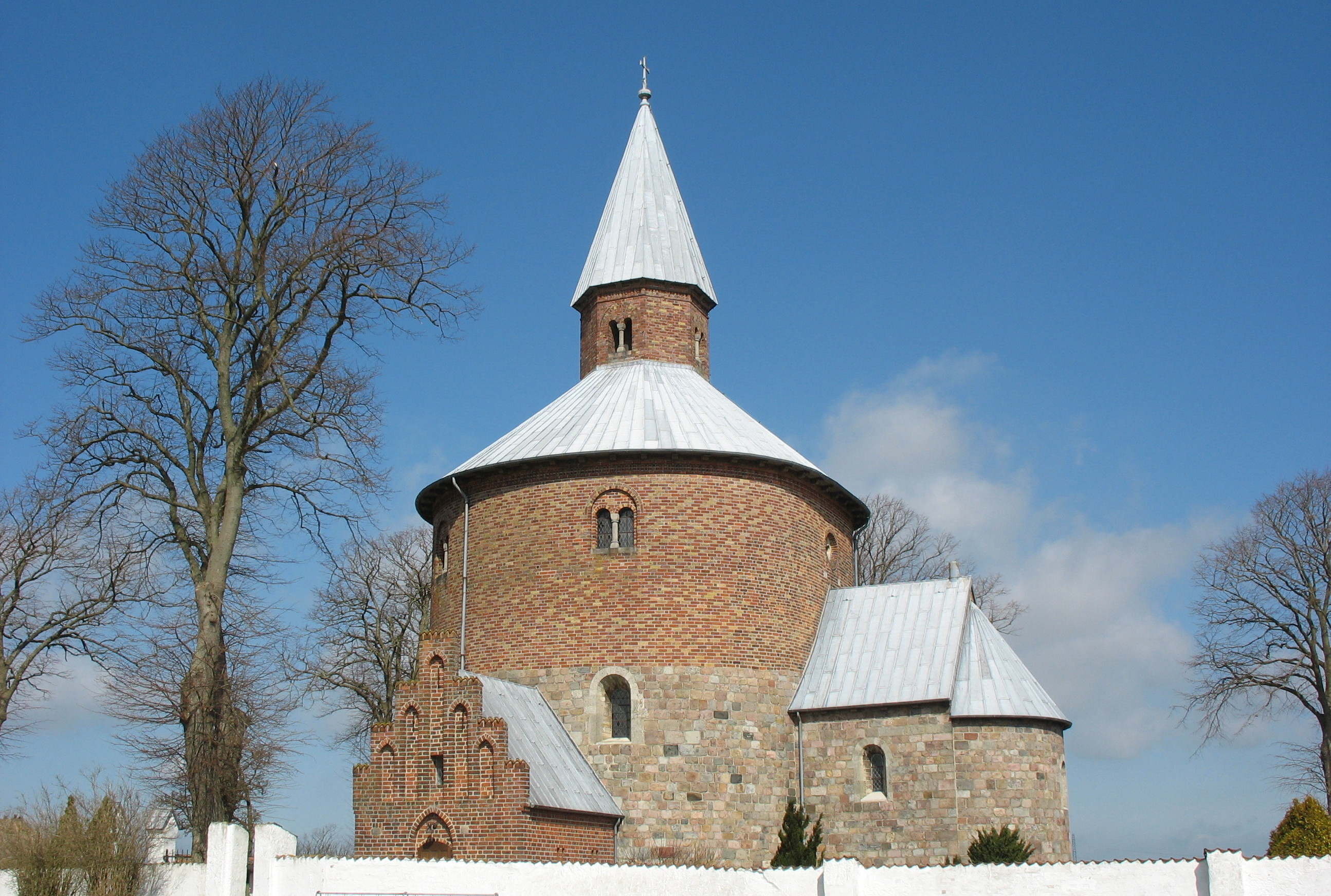
- Bjernede Church
- Location: Bjernede, Denmark
- Denomination: Church of Denmark
- Website: www.bjernede-kirke.dk

Architecture
- Architectural type: Round church
- Years built: c. 1170

Administration
- Diocese: Diocese of Roskilde
- Parish: Bjernede Sogn

Bjernede Church (Danish: Bjernede Kirke) is a medieval era round church located near Sorø, Denmark. It is one of only seven remaining round churches in Denmark and the only one of its kind on the island of Zealand.

== History ==
The present church was built in circa 1170 by Sune Ebbesen, from the influential Hvide clan who belonged to King Valdemar II's social circle. His father, Ebbe Skjalmsen, the uncle of Bishop Absalon, had previously built a wooden church at the site. The tower of Sune Ebbesen's round church contains a room which the Hvide family used as an assemblage hall.

== Architecture ==
The lower part of the church stands in granite while the upper part is made of brick, a relatively new material at the time which had only been used in Denmark since the 1140s. The inspiration for the design most likely came from the former St. George's Church (Sct. Georgs kirke) of Schlamersdorf in Wagria which Sune Ebbesen had visited several times as a military commander. Bjernede Church, Horne Church on Funen and Thorsager Church in Jutland are all built to the same floor plan as that of the Schlamersdorf Church. Four interior granite columns support the roof structure. The porch was built in about 1500 and the tower had previously been altered but was, between 1890 and 1892, changed by architect Hermann Baagøe Storck (1839–1922) to what he believed was its original design.

== Influence ==
Storck was later heavily criticized for his restoration work. Architects Peder Vilhelm Jensen-Klint and Ivar Bentsen later made church projects which resembled Bjernede prior to Storck's intervention, when it had a Bishop's Hat-like roof. Storck's restoration came to mark a turning point in Danish restoration architecture which from then on applied a more sensitive approach to the restoration of historical buildings.

== See also ==
- Nordic round churches

== Other Sources ==
- K. Paul, Trench The Architecture of the Churches of Denmark (1892) (Trübner, & Co., ltd.)
