= Thorsager Church =

Coordinates: 56°20′32.2″N 10°27′38.4″E

- Thorsager Kirke
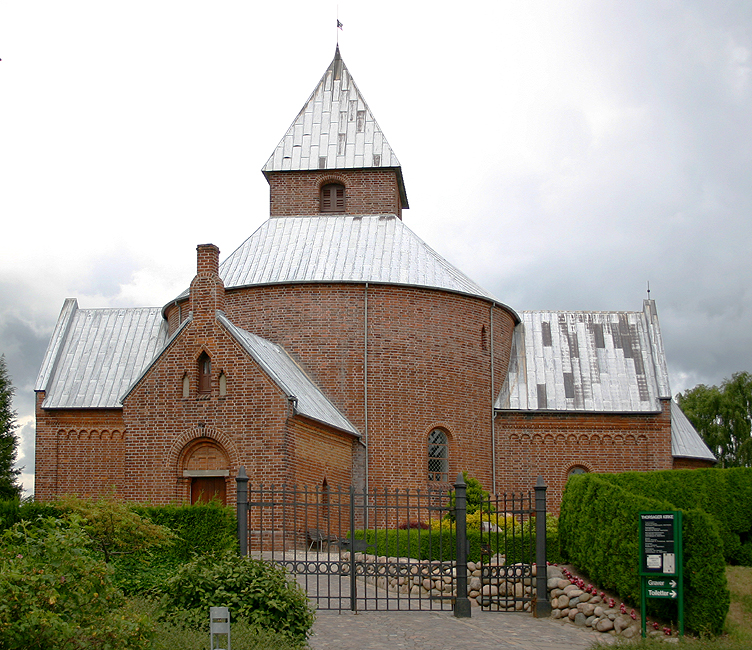
- Thorsager Church
- Location: Thorsager, Denmark
- Denomination: Church of Denmark

Architecture
- Architectural type: Round church
- Style: Romanesque style
- Completed: ca. 1200

Administration
- Diocese: Diocese of Aarhus
- Deanery: Syddjurs Provsti
- Parish: Thorsager Sogn

Thorsager Church (Danish: Thorsager Kirke) is a lutheran church in Thorsager, Denmark within the Diocese of Aarhus in the Church of Denmark. The church is the only round church in Jutland. It was originally built during the 13th century in the Romanesque style, and has gone through several additions, renovations, and restorations since.

== History ==
The town of Thorsager, which the church is named after, is a reference to the norse god Thor. Because of its name, the town was likely of religious significance within the Old Norse religion before christianity was introduced to the area. It is speculated that the hill which the current church was built on was once considered sacred, as the remnants of a wooden church, built between the 900s and 1000s, were found beneath the church in the 1950s.

Thorsager church was built around the year 1200 and is the most modern of the seven remaining round churches in Denmark. The church's tower, nave, and apse were built in the romanesque style from brick. Though the round church was built in a distinctive style, there is some controversy over who is responsible for its construction. Torsager estate was reportedly owned by King Valdemar II in 1231, though it is likely that the bishop Peder Vognsen commissioned the church's construction.

== Architecture ==
Thorsager church was built using the same floor plan as the former church of Schlamersdorf in Wagria and is one of the so-called "Absalon round churches", along with Bjernede Church and Horne Church. The church's round nave is domed by small, ribless cross vaults. A spiral staircase, which circles around the nave, leads to a low-ceilinged room above the vaults. This loft within the tower is relatively large, but is rarely used because the narrow staircase which accesses it would become a hazard in the event of a fire. The loft and the tower above are supported by four large brick pillars that stand in the middle of the nave. During the middle ages, a second tower and a church porch were added to the western side.

The current brick altar was built in 1952. The altarpiece is a late gothic crucifix from the 15th century which bears the inscription "In me you shall have peace" (Danish: ”I mig skal I have fred”). In the window above the altar hangs a piece of stained glass, created by the artist Harald Borre in 1955, which depicts the resurrection of Jesus. A bible, which was published by King Christian VI in 1740, is displayed on the altar. The candle holders date back to the 17th century, while the Chalice is from 1878, and the pyx was made in 1965.

The baptismal font is from the middle ages and is the oldest fixture in the church. Its basin is from the 18th century. An organ was installed in 1909, and replaced in 2004.

=== Restorations ===
The church's first series of renovations were conducted between 1877 and 1879 by Vilhelm Theodor Walther, the Royal Building Inspector of Jutland. At the time, restorations generally sought to return buildings to their original form without regard to any additions that may have been made since. As a result, the renovations closely resembled the original church, but lacked the authenticity of a church which had already been used for several centuries. Over the years, the original bricks on the outside of the church had been covered in whitewash and had weathered and cracked. During the renovation the majority of these were replaced by machine formed bricks; the original stones only remain on the northern side of the nave. The western church tower, which had been added during the middle ages, was removed. In the interior, all of the walls were plastered white and painted with frescos.

The second restoration was carried out between 1950 and 1952. It largely reversed Walther's changes to the church's interior. The plaster and frescos were removed and the bricks were instead whitewashed. A new altar, pulpit, and floor were installed, while the pews were replaced with individual chairs.

During the 2004 renovation the interior of the church was re-whitewashed. The pulpit was replaced by a lectern, created by the local artist Birger Holmgaard Johansen. The organ, installed in 1909, was also replaced. The new organ was built by Bruno Christensen & Sønner and has 15 registers. Because of the acoustics created by the round dome, musical performances in the church are well attended.

== Gallery ==
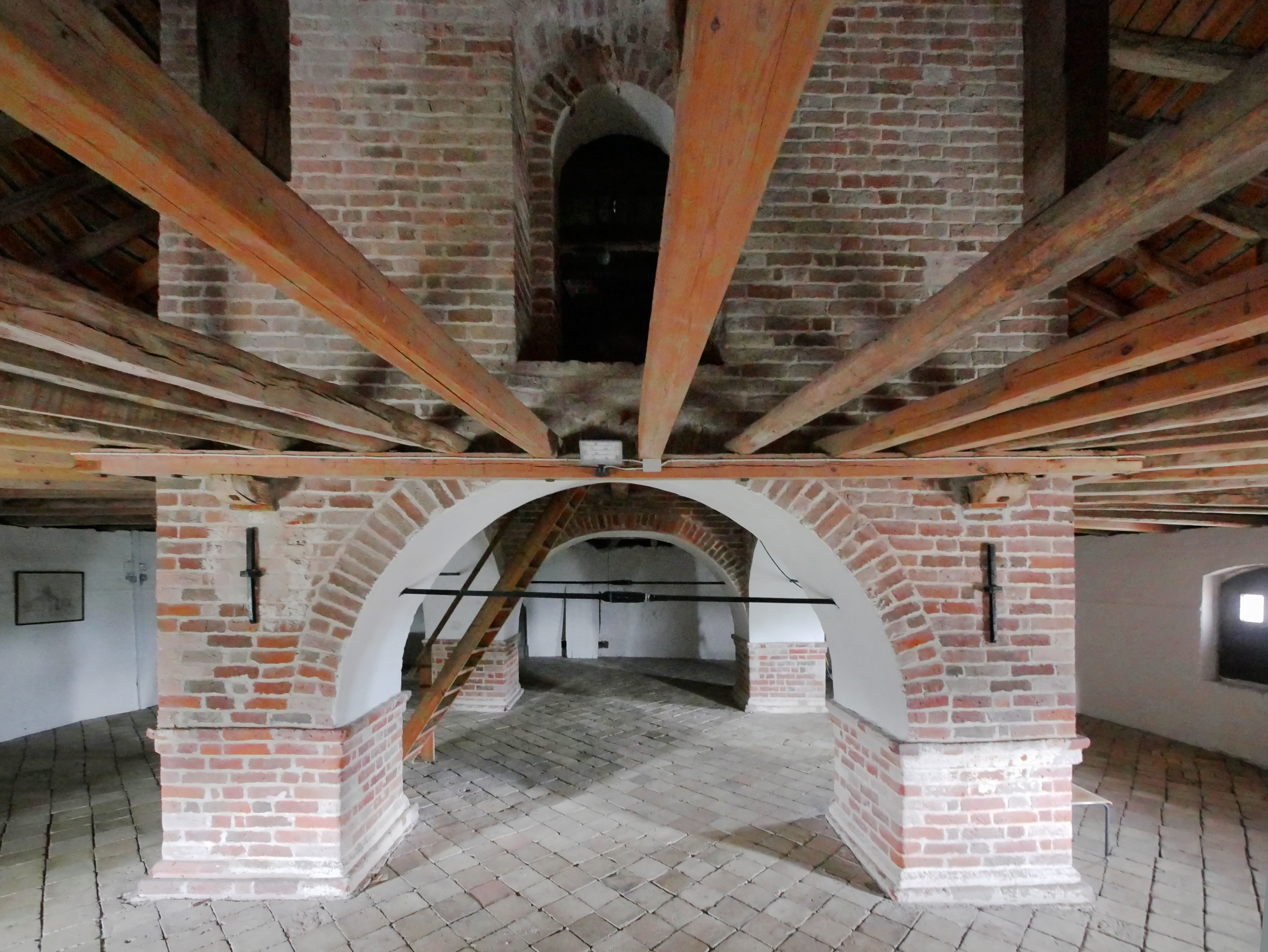
Interior of the loft.

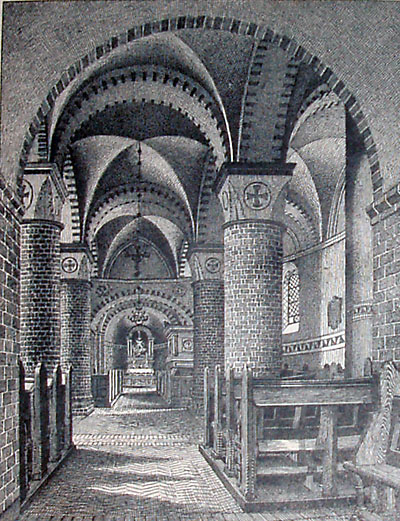
The nave in 1901, illustrated by Josef Theodor Hansen.

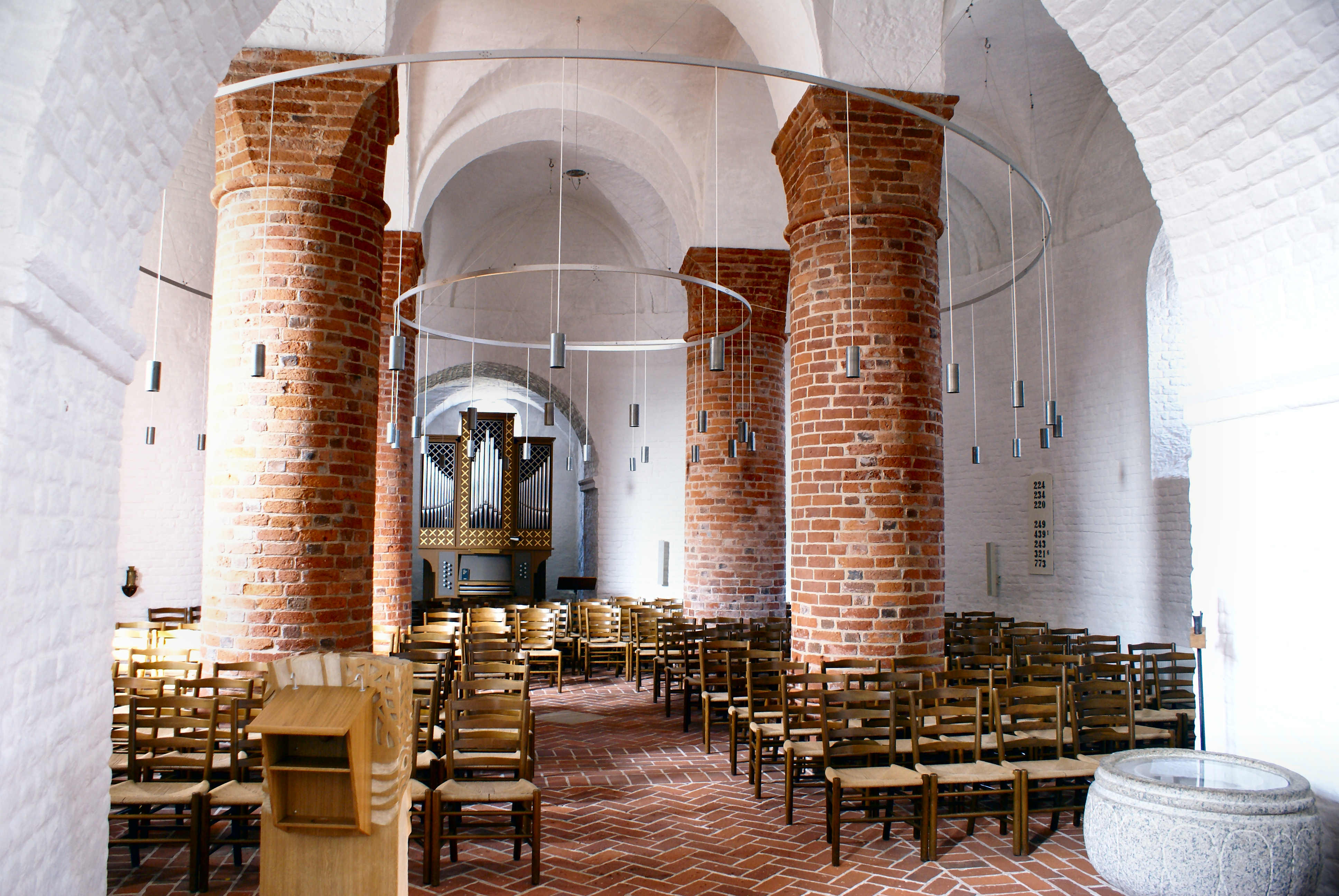
The nave in 2009.

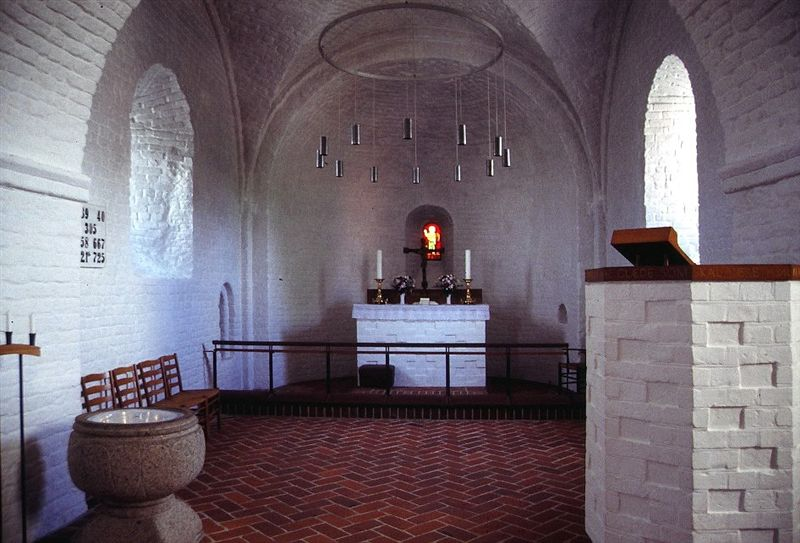
The church's baptismal font, altar, and pulpit, 2006.

== See also ==
- Nordic round churches
