= Bosjökloster =

Building in Höör Municipality, Skåne County, Sweden

Bosjö Abbey
- Bosjökloster
- Höör Municipality
- Bosjökloster

Site information
- Type: Abbey, Castle
- Open to the public: Yes

Location
- Scania, Sweden
- Location within Skåne
- Coordinates: 55.877222°N 13.518611°E

Site history
- Built: 1080

Bosjökloster ("Bosjö Abbey") is a castle located on the shore of Lake Ringsjön in Höör Municipality, Scania, Sweden.

== History ==
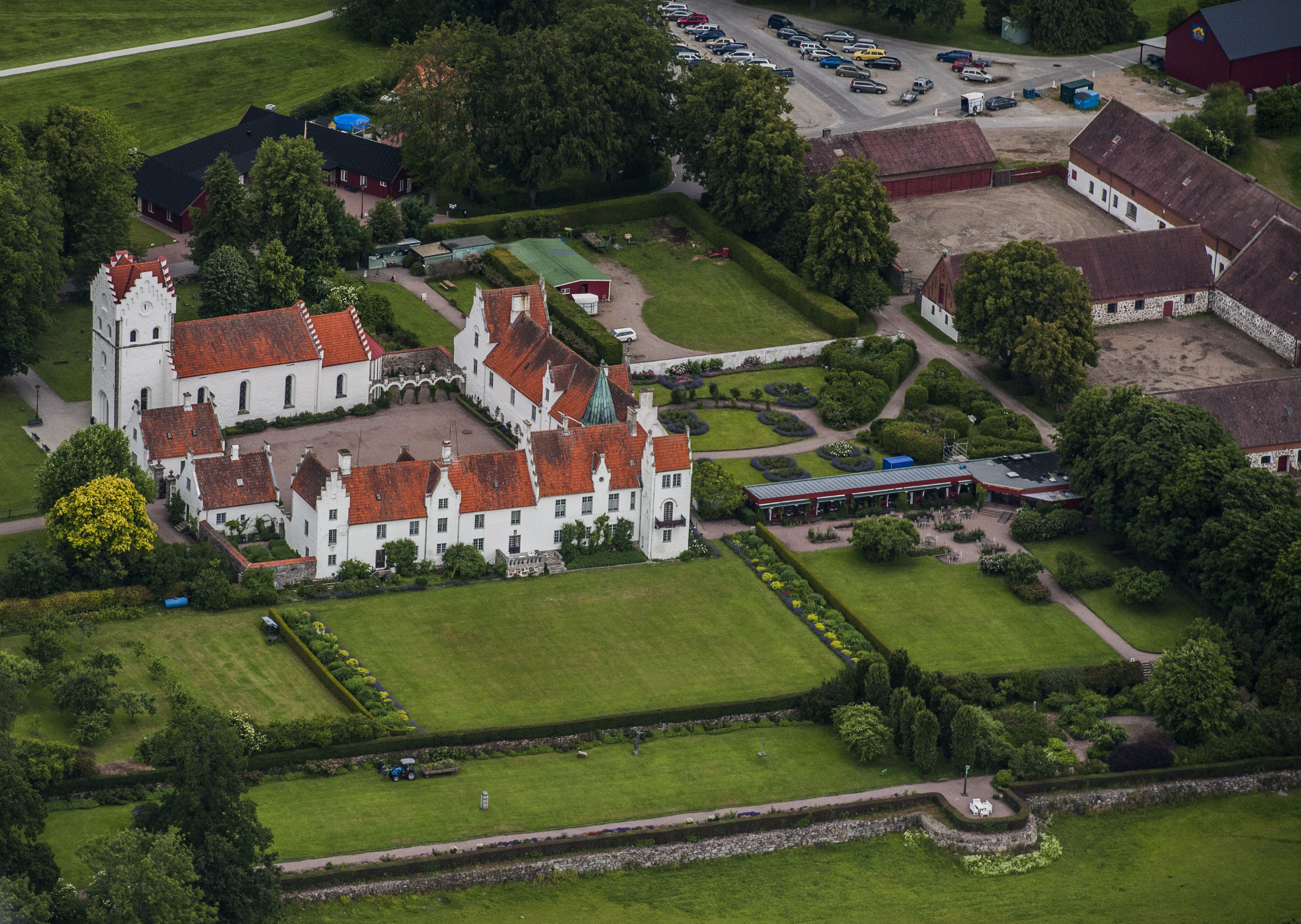
Aerial view of Bosjökloster

It was originally a nunnery, founded in 1080 by the Benedictine Order. The oldest preserved document that mentions Bosjö Abbey was written by Pope Lucius III in 1181, when he confirmed its privileges. The abbey was transformed into a castle in the 16th century, and only parts of the original building remains. During the Danish Reformation in the 16th century, the nunnery was closed down and the estate became Danish crown property. It was subsequently donated to Torbern Bille, the former archbishop of the Diocese of Lund under the condition that he took care of the remaining nuns. In 1560 King Frederick II of Denmark gave the estate as a barter to the widowed Scanian noble woman Thale Ulfstand. Her initials and the year 1569 are carved into the large oak doors of the entrance and are still visible.

Bosjökloster in 1680

The castle passed to the Beck family through marriage in 1629, but when Jochum Beck (1602–1682) lost the family fortune, it was sold to Corfitz Ulfeldt (1606–1664) to repay his debts. Ulfeldt was a Danish aristocrat famous for having switched sides. When he showed up at the peace negotiations at the Treaty of Roskilde proceedings to negotiate on behalf of Sweden, he was convicted of treason by a Danish court. Soon thereafter, he was also convicted of treason by a Swedish court, and was forced into exile. His wife Leonora Christina (1621–1698), daughter of King Christian IV, was captured in his place by the Danish authorities and was imprisoned in the Blue Tower in Copenhagen for 22 years.

Bosjökloster Castle was sequestered by the Swedish state and fell into disrepair. After a lawsuit in 1735, Bosjökloster was returned to the Beck family, who renovated the castle. They sold it in 1908 to Count Philip Bonde, whose family still owns Bosjökloster. The composer Hilding Rosenberg (1892–1985) was born in the gardener's residence just south of the church tower.

== Gallery ==
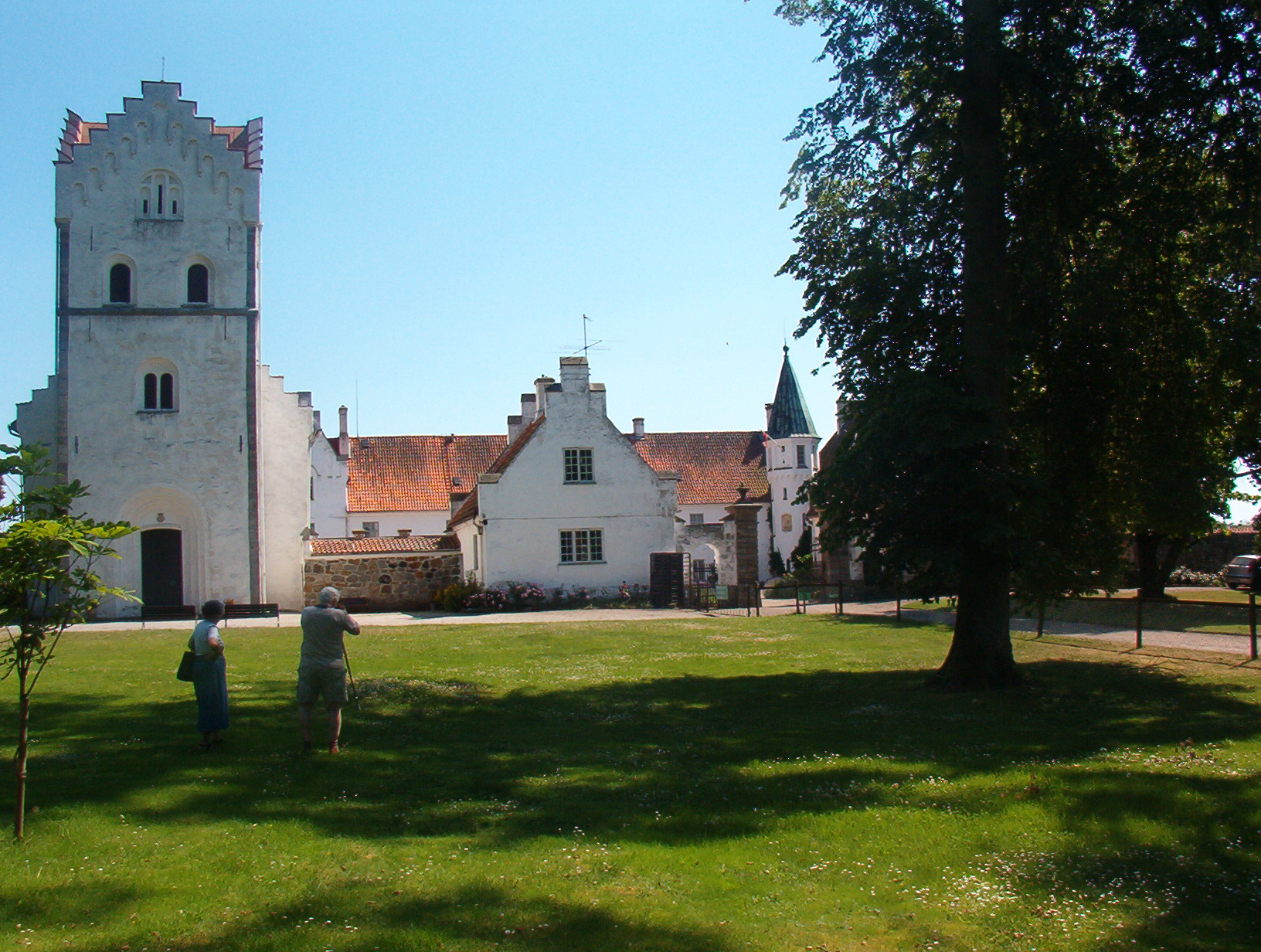
The exterior of the monastery church of Bosjö

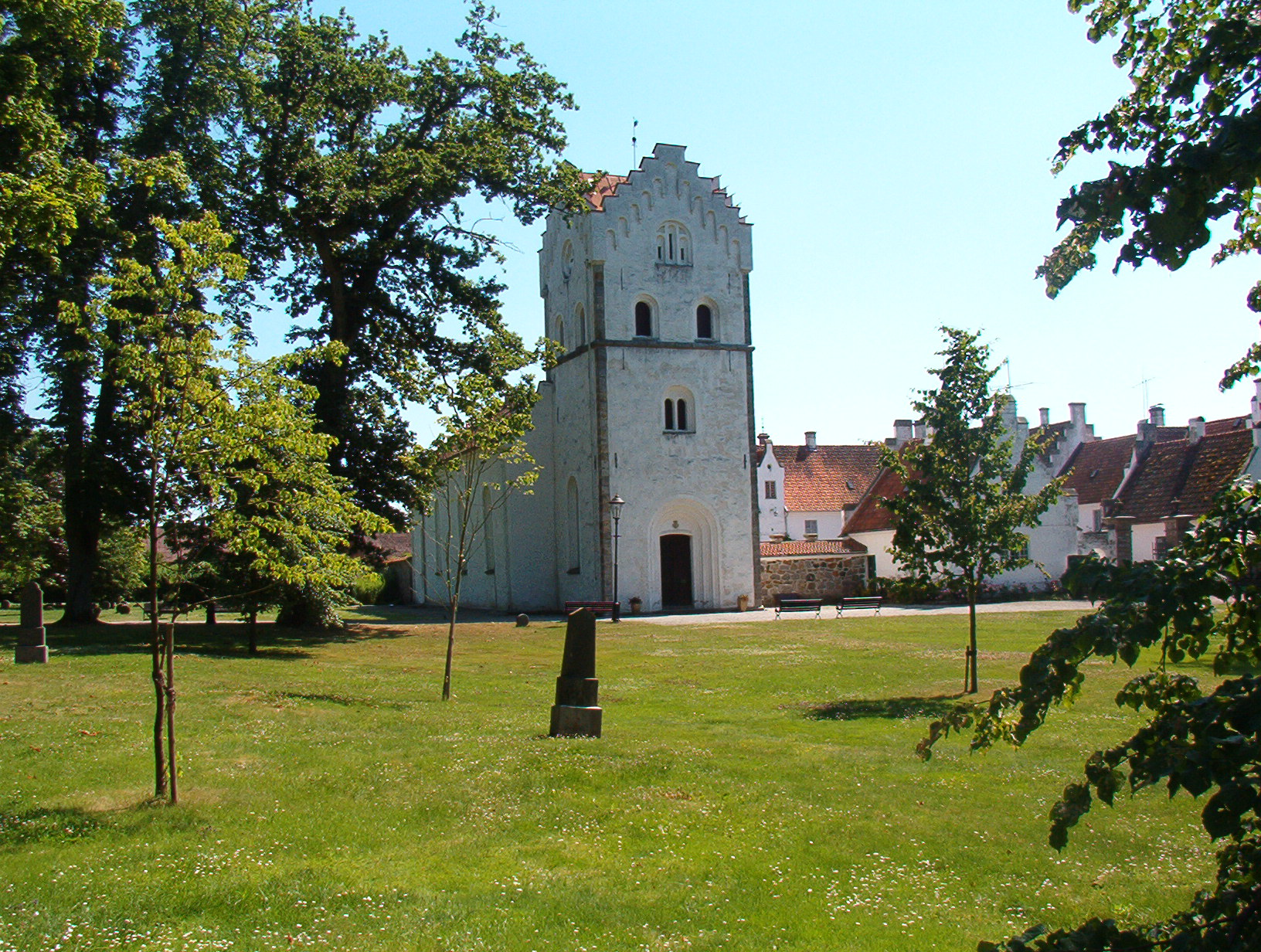
Exterior view

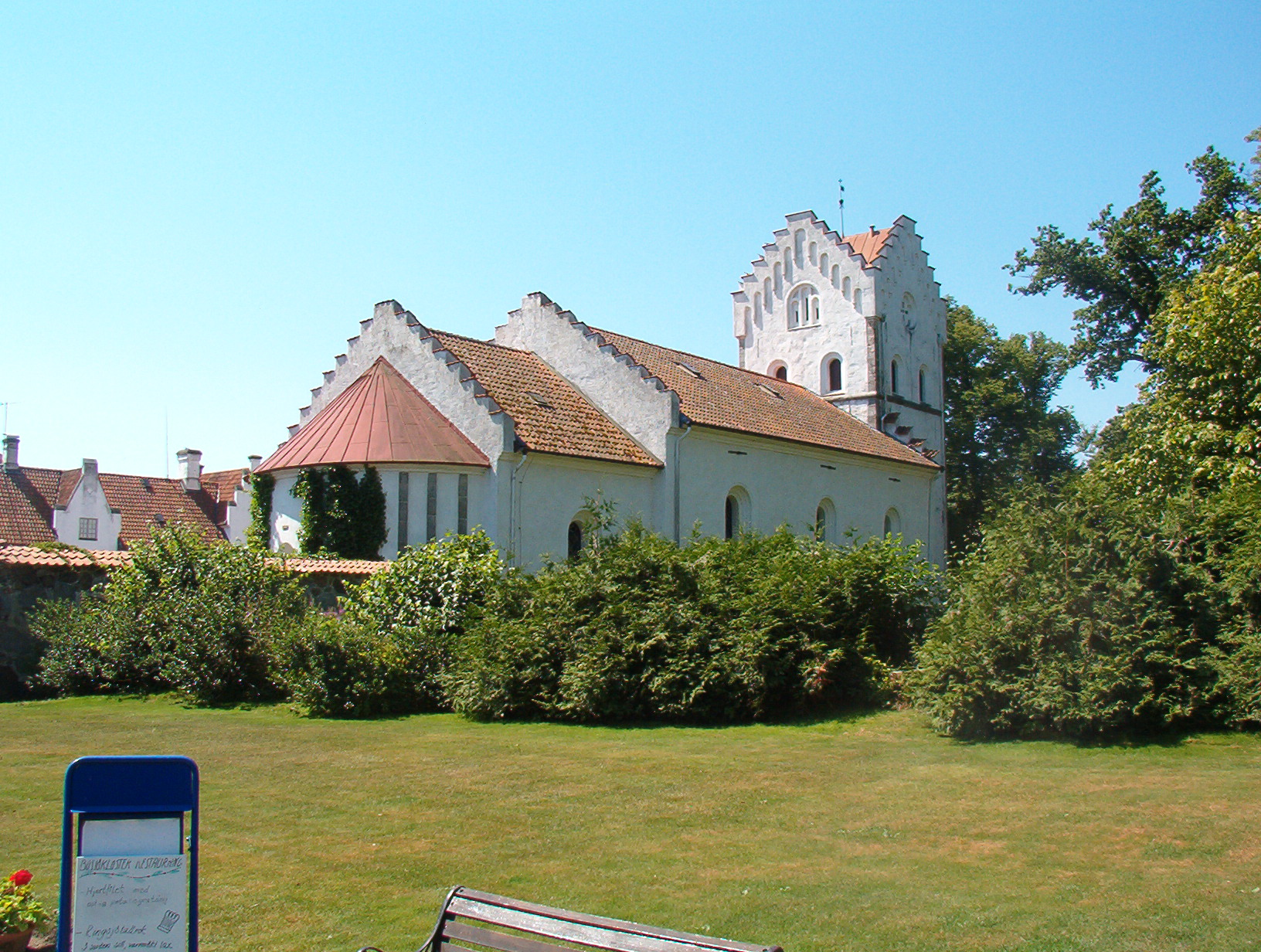
Exterior view

Bosjökloster windmill

Rose garden

Llama in the park

Inner courtyard

The monastery church of Bosjö

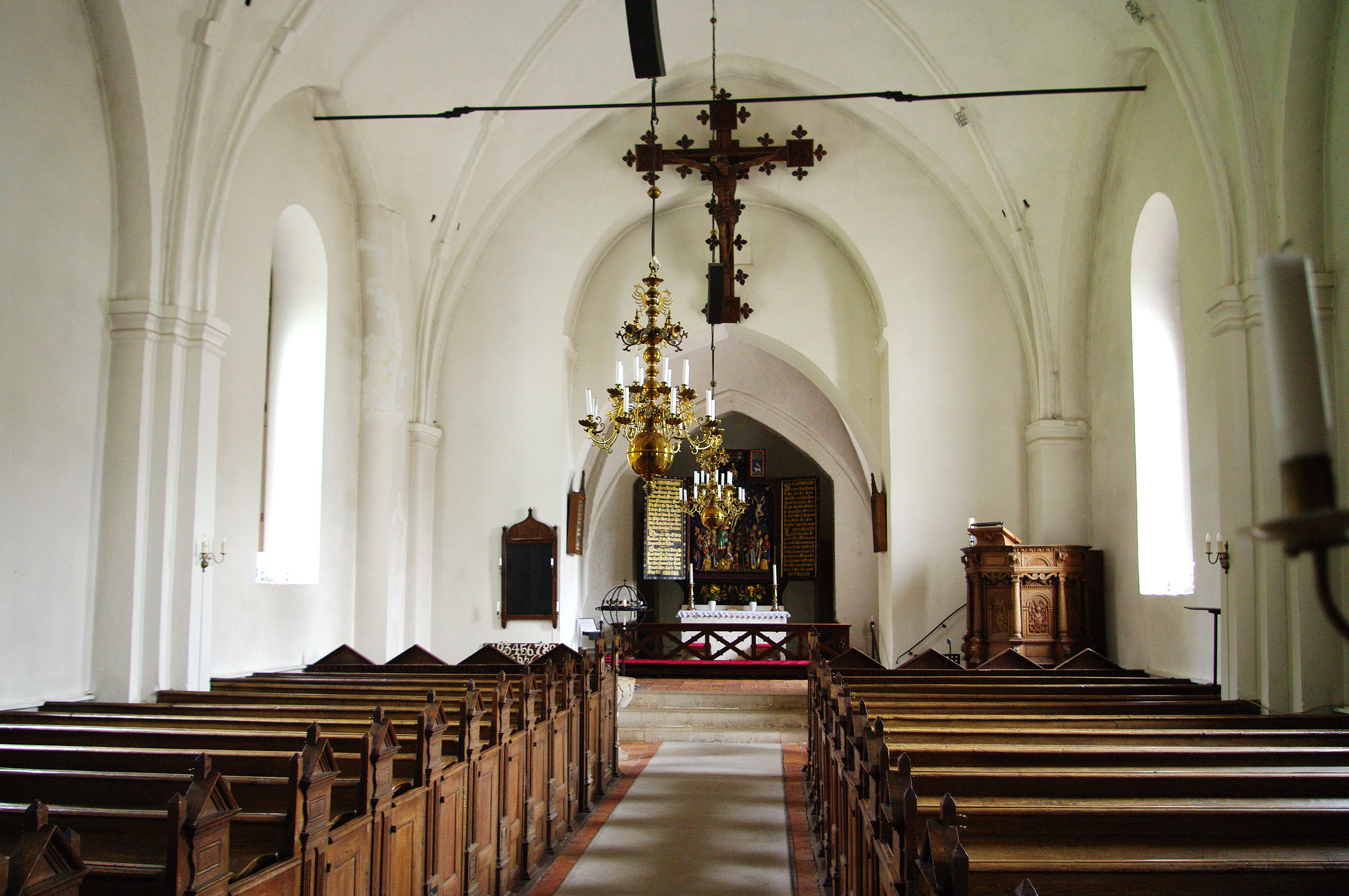
The interior of the monastery church of Bosjö

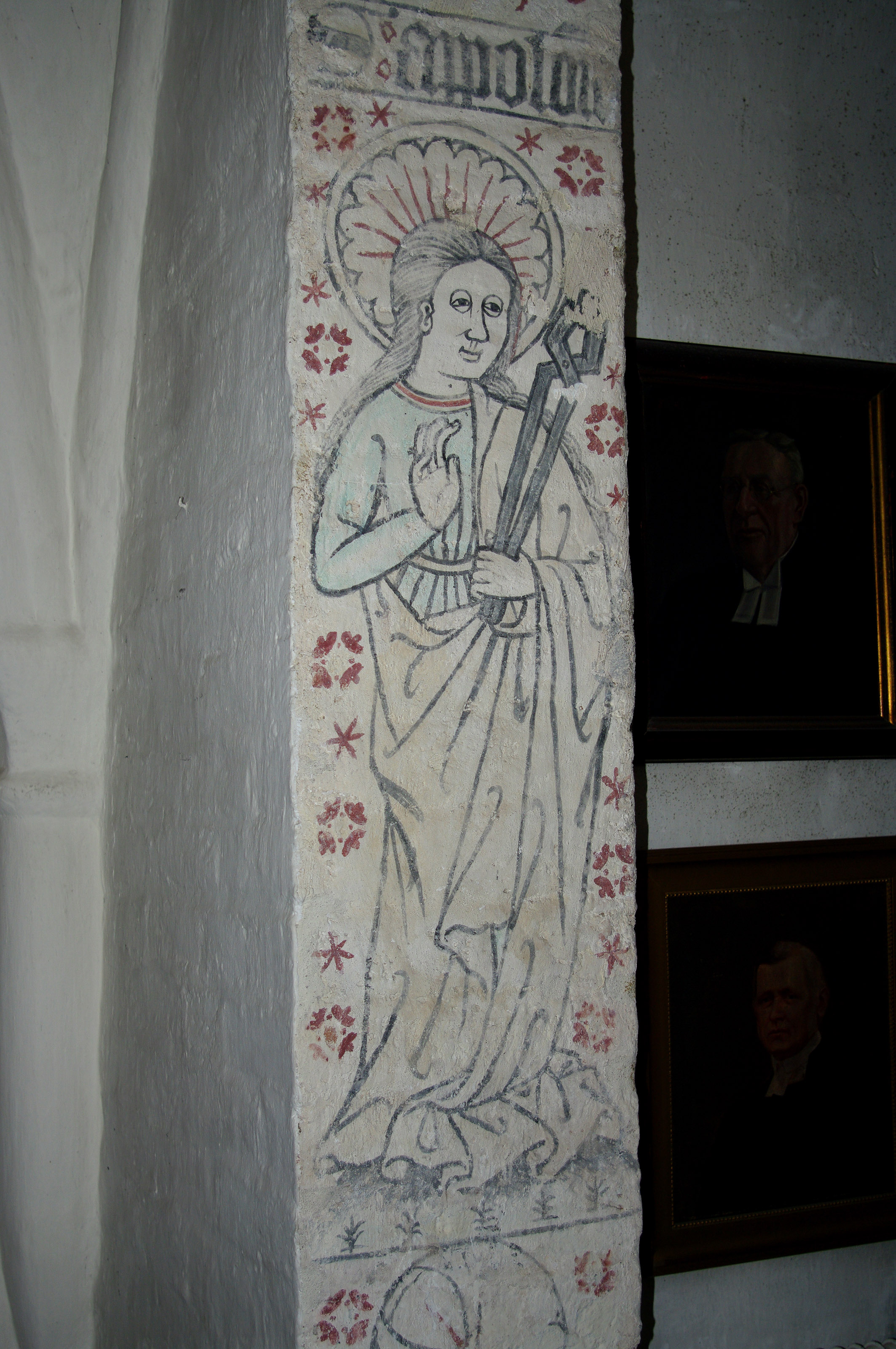
St Appolonia in the Bosjö Monastery

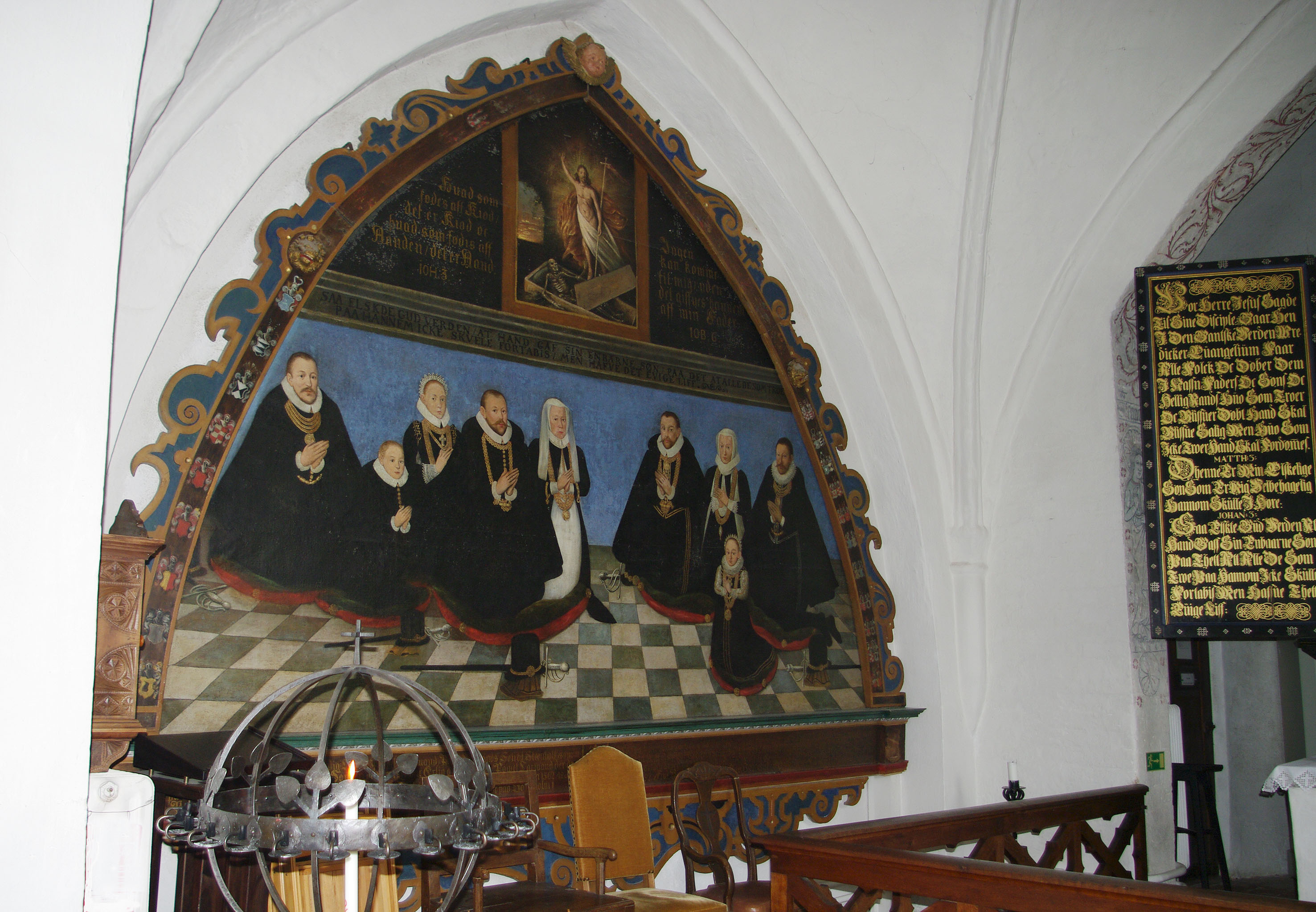
Votive portrait of several generations of the Laxmand family

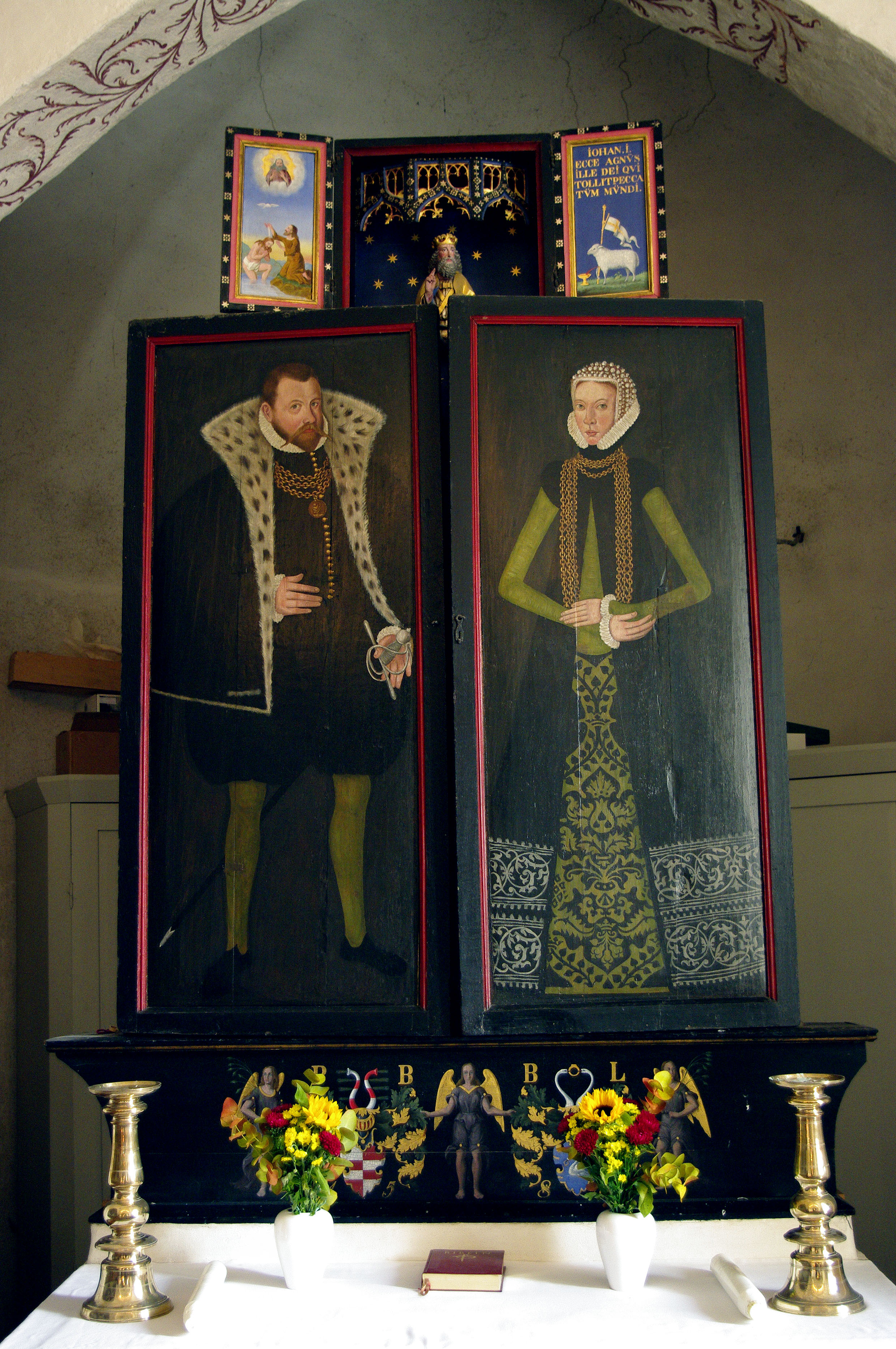
The retable in the monastery church of Bosjö #1, featuring votive portraits of the couple who donated it, Peter Bille and Birgitte Laxmand

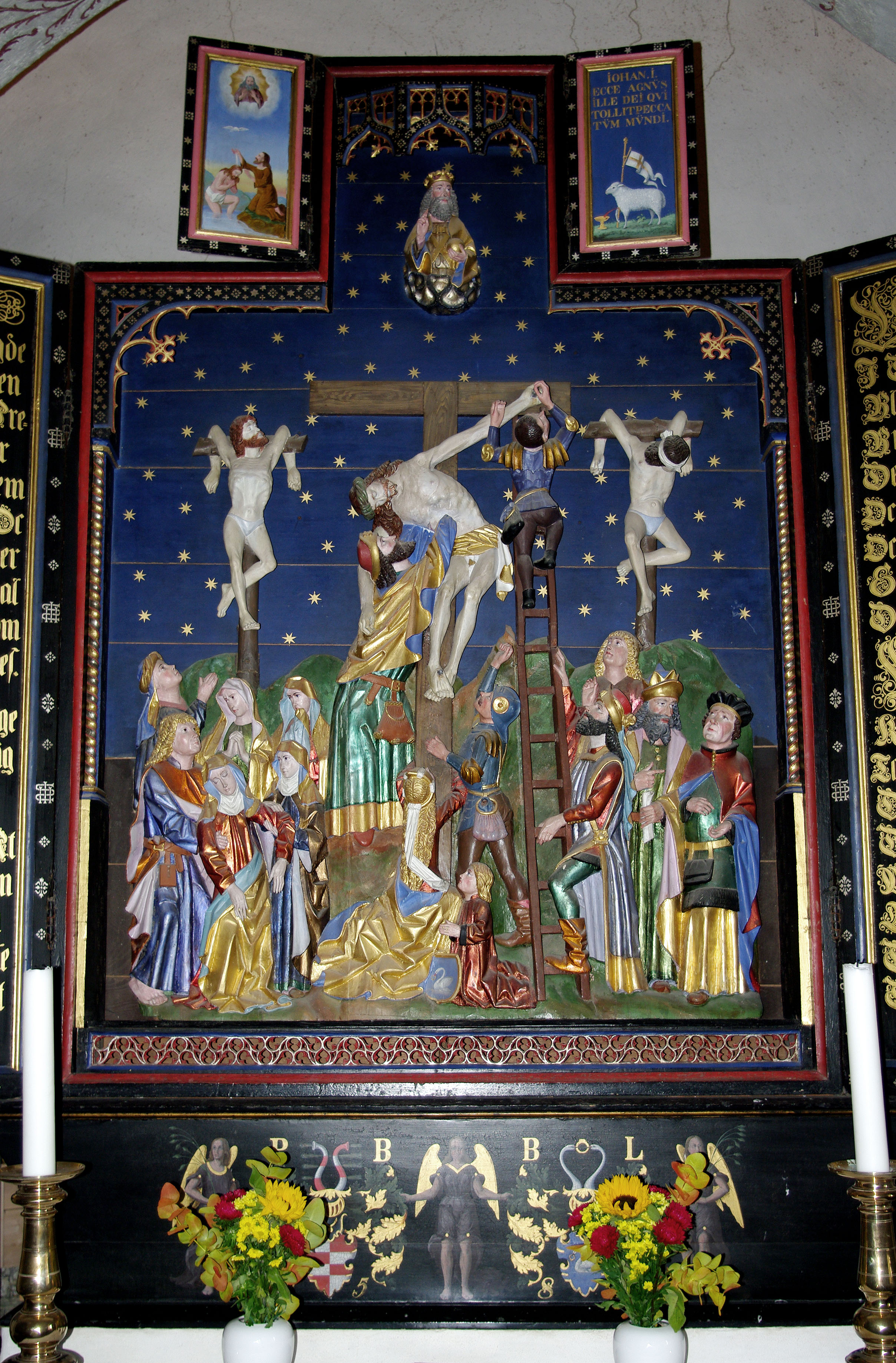
The retable in the monastery church of Bosjö #2; the initials and coats of arms of the couple who donated it are visible—P B for Peter Bille and B L for Birgitte Laxmand

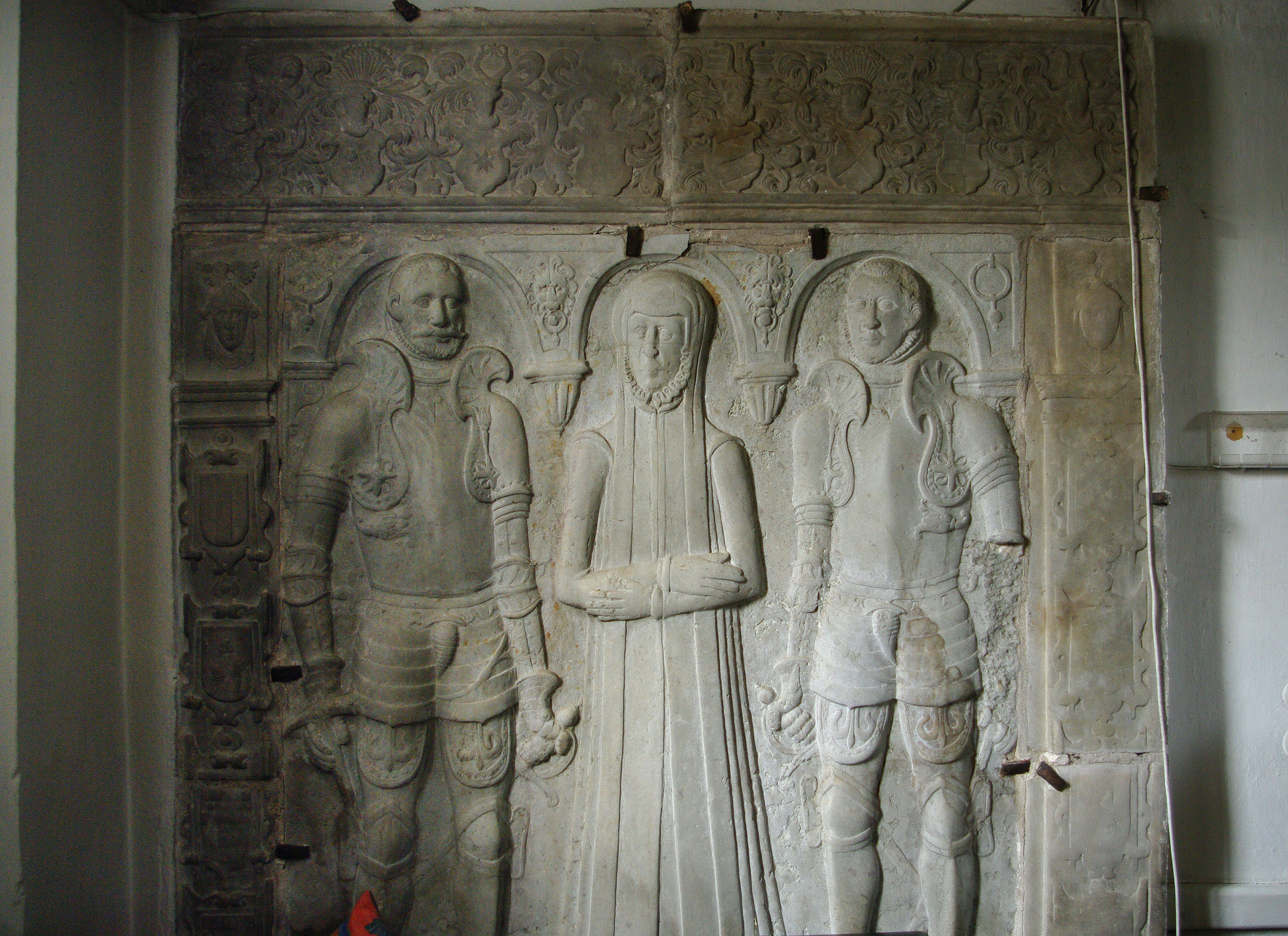
The gravestone of Thale Ulfstand from late 1500s

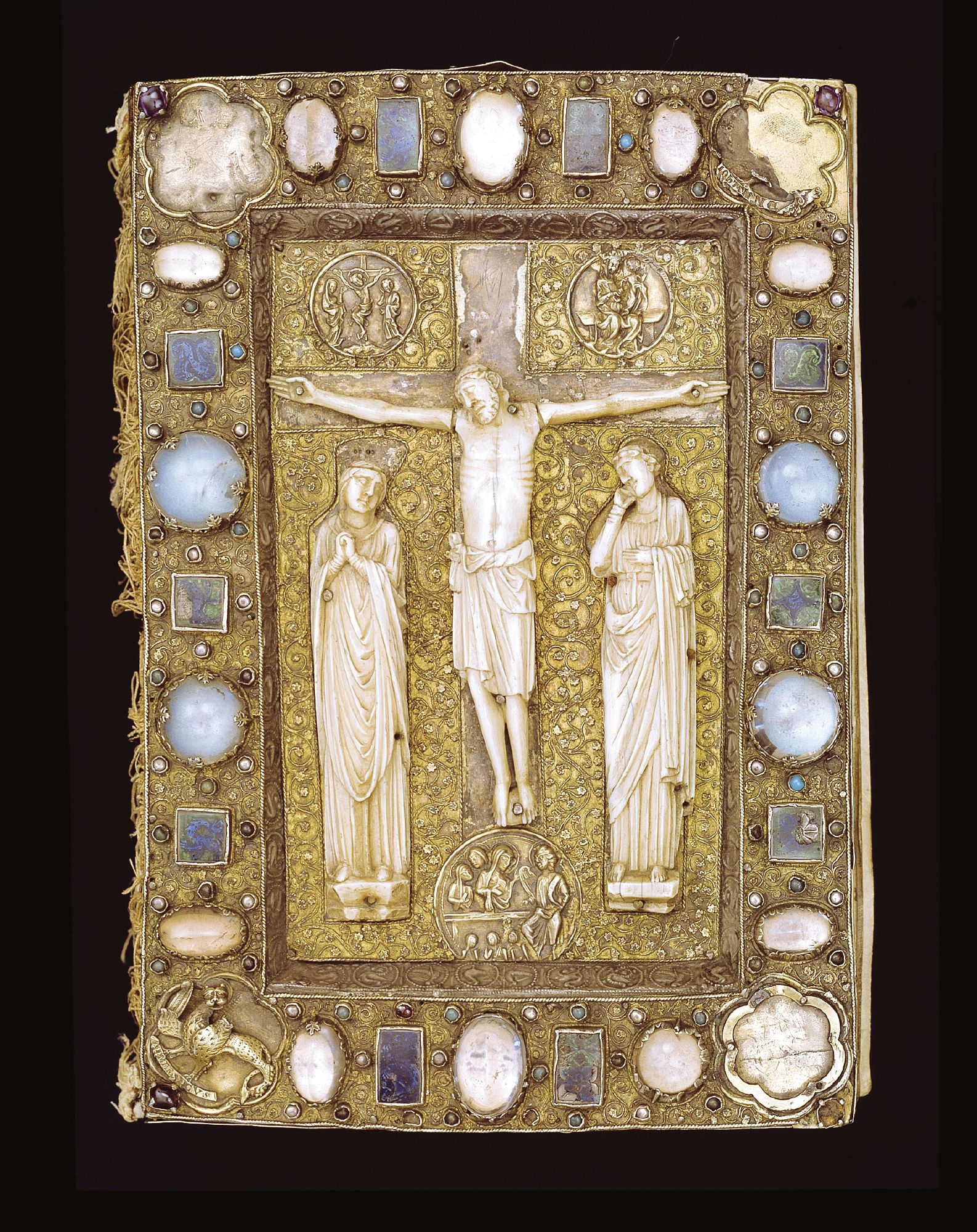
The Horne Book, a medieval manuscript possibly made för the monastery.

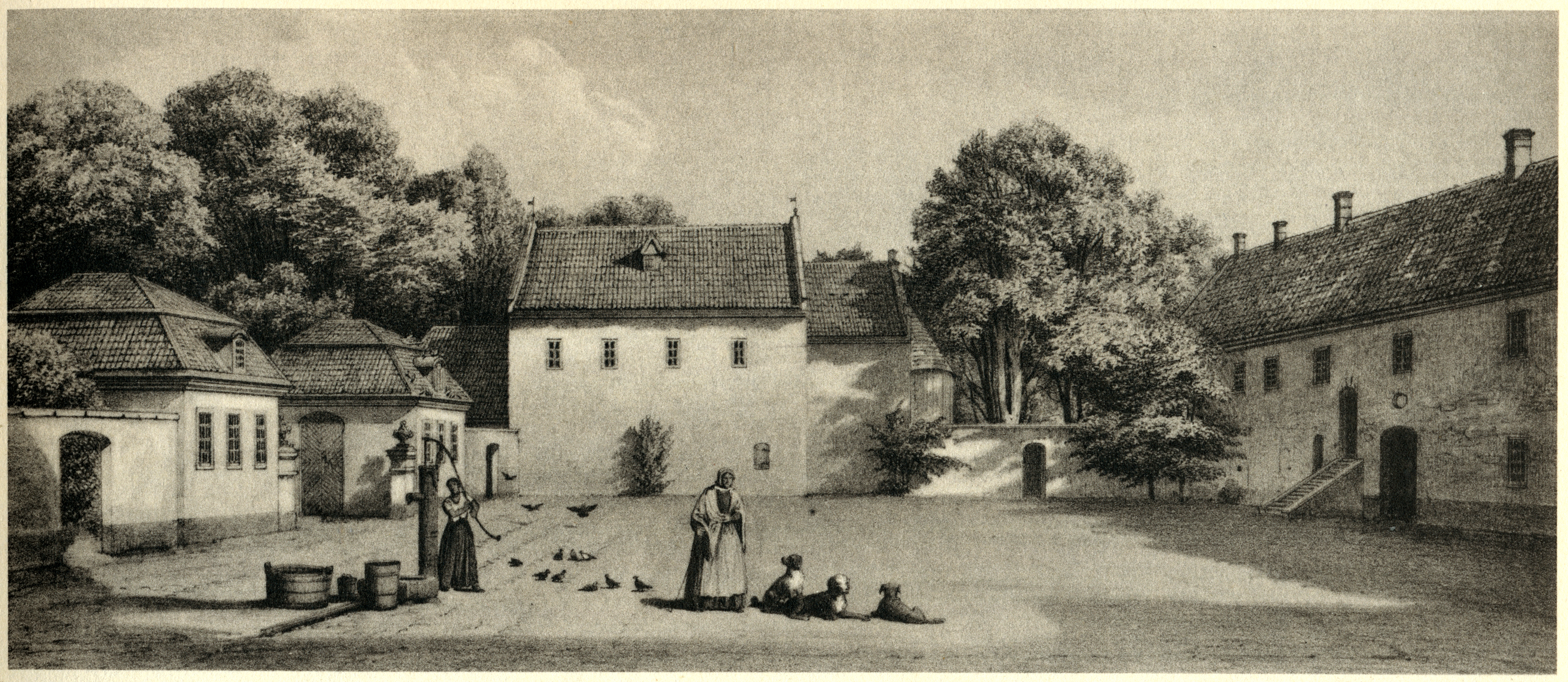
Bosjö Monastery about 1850

== See also ==
List of castles in Skåne
