= Horne Book =

13th-century manuscript

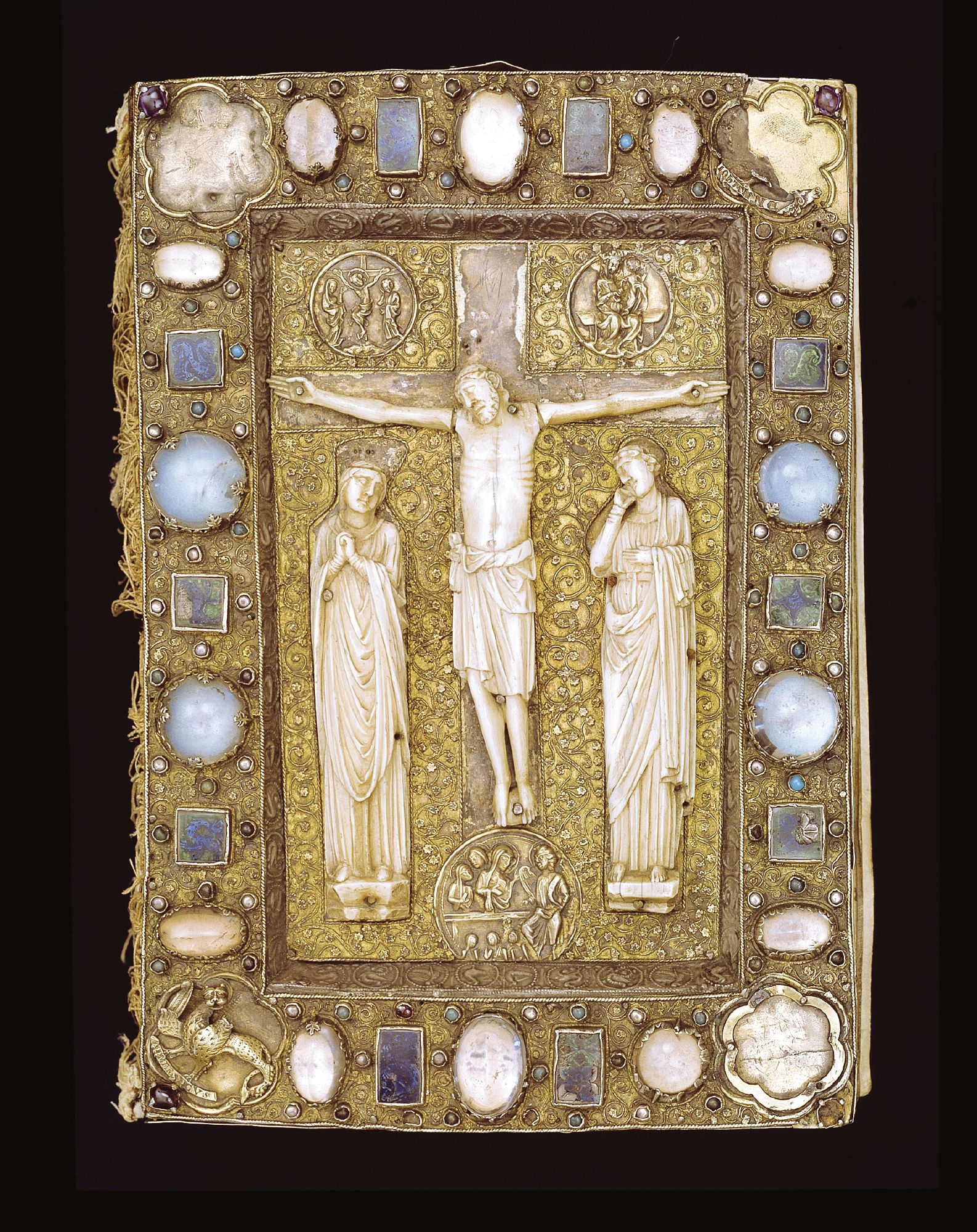
The decorated front cover of the Horne Book

The Horne Book (Danish: Hornebogen) is an evangeliary from the 13th century kept in the National Museum of Denmark. It may have been made for the Benedictine monastery Bosjökloster in present-day Sweden. In 1656 it was donated to Horne Church, where it remained until 1818, when it was taken to the National Museum in Copenhagen. It is richly decorated; it contains several full-page miniatures and other decorative elements, and its front cover is richly decorated by rock crystals, enamel, gold, and a crucifix made of walrus ivory.

== History ==
The Horne Book was made around 1200–1225. Its origins are unknown. Danish book historian Lauritz Nielsen (1881–1947) argued that the book was made in Denmark, though he also pointed to stylistic influences from England in the miniatures, and from northern Germany in the subsidiary ornamentation. Later research has pointed to the Rhineland, perhaps Cologne, as a source of origin for the miniatures.

It may have been made for the Benedictine monastery Bosjökloster in present-day Sweden (then part of Denmark). The only local saint mentioned in the pericope list included in the book is Saint Olaf, indicating a Nordic connection, and the patron saint of Bosjökloster, Saint Nicholas, is depicted in the book in a similar fashion as the same saint is depicted on the seal of the monastery. A perhaps stronger connection to Bosjökloster is also indicated by the fact that the earliest known private owner of the manuscript, Oluf Rosensparre (1559–1624), was the son of the owners of Bosjökloster (following the Reformation in Denmark and the suppression of monasteries) Steen Jensen Rosensparre (1523–1565) and Mette Rosenkrantz (1533–1588).

After 1588, the book passed by inheritance to the owners of Skovsbo Manor on Funen in present-Denmark, and then to the owners of Hvedholm Castle. In 1656 the owners of Hvedholm Castle donated the book to Horne Church, in the same parish as the castle. It remained in the church, displayed at the altar, until 1810, when lensgreve Preben Bille-Brahe donated it to a royal commission for the preservation of ancient objects (Oldsagskommissionen), who brought it to the National Museum of Denmark in Copenhagen, where it is still kept.

An abortive attempt was made in the 1990s to make a popularly accessible facsimile edition of the book.

== Description ==
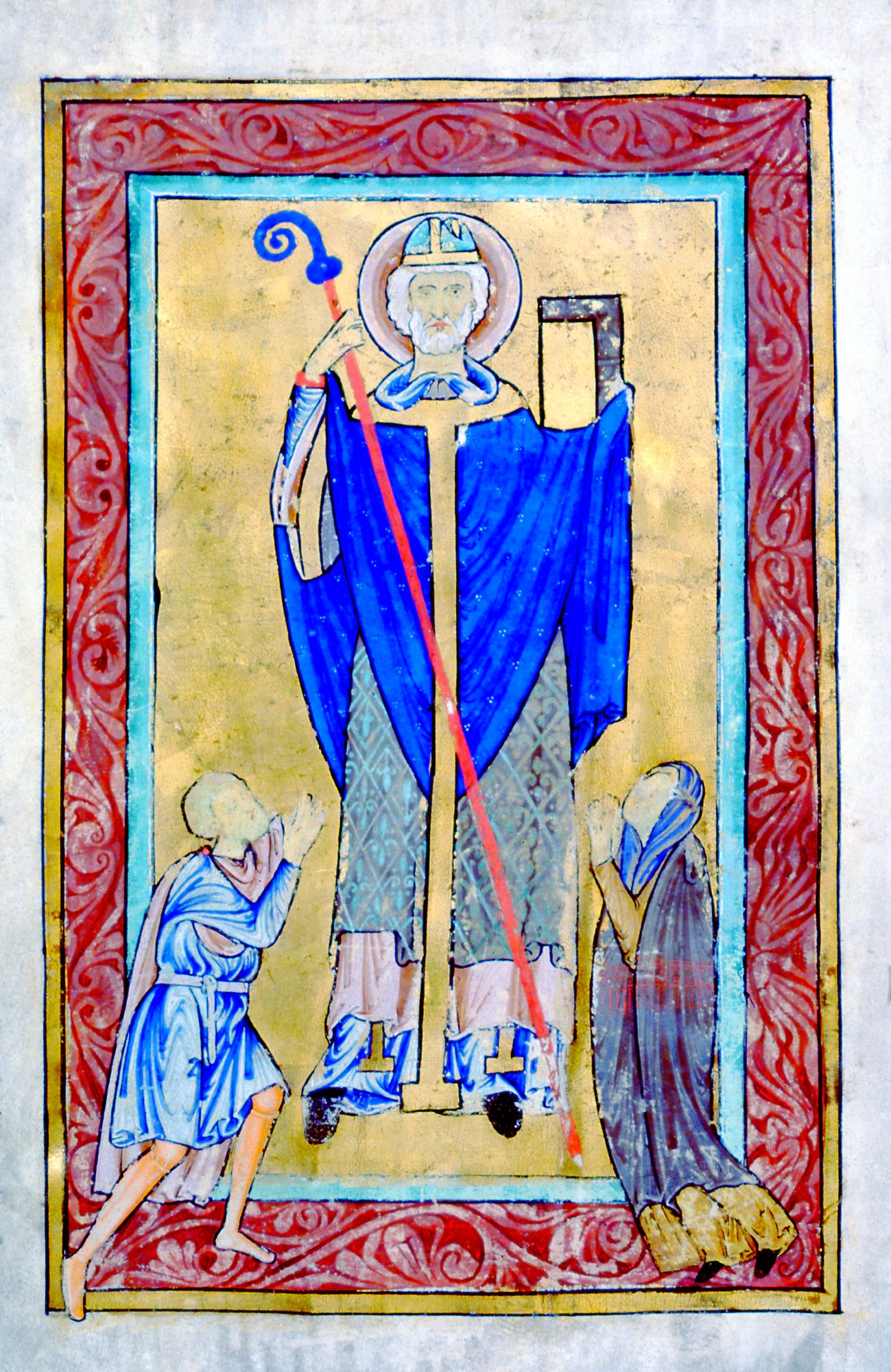
One of the full-page miniatures, with a donor portrait depicting a man and a woman, and a saint, probably Saint Nicholas.

The Horne Book is an evangeliary, written in Latin. It contains the four gospels and accompanying texts, including so-called canon tables. It consists of 203 parchment leaves and is richly illustrated. It contains seven full-page miniatures, depicting the Four Evangelists, the Crucifixion, Christ in Majesty and a donor portrait of a man and a woman. There are also five decorated pages and fourteen decorated full-page canon tables as well as several decorated initials, some of pure gold leaf and some polychromous.

The binding dates from about one century later than the rest of the book, from the early 14th century, but incorporates a 13th-century walrus ivory crucifix which may have been part of the original binding. Only the front cover is more or less preserved, though it lacks several of the original pieces. Even so it remains lavish; the front is an oak wood board covered with gilt silver plates decorated with filigree. The central panel is surrounded by a raised broad border, originally decorated in each corner with the symbols of the evangelists (only one remains). The rest of the border contains alternating cabochon pieces of rock crystal and enamelled blue and green plates, as well as several smaller gemstones.

Apart from its medieval decoration and binding, several pages in the beginning of the book have also been adorned with large and colourful coats of arms of several previous owners, beginning with Oluf Rosensparre.

== Sources cited ==
- Danmarks kirker. Skovsbos kapel og vejsidekors (PDF) (in Danish). Vol. IX. Copenhagen: National Museum of Denmark. 2017. pp. 4473–4484. OCLC 1011256092.
- Nielsen, Lauritz (1937). Danmarks middelalderlige haandskrifter [The medieval manuscripts of Denmark]. Copenhagen: Gyldendal. OCLC 260102228.
