= Horne, Faaborg-Midtfyn =

Horne
- Village
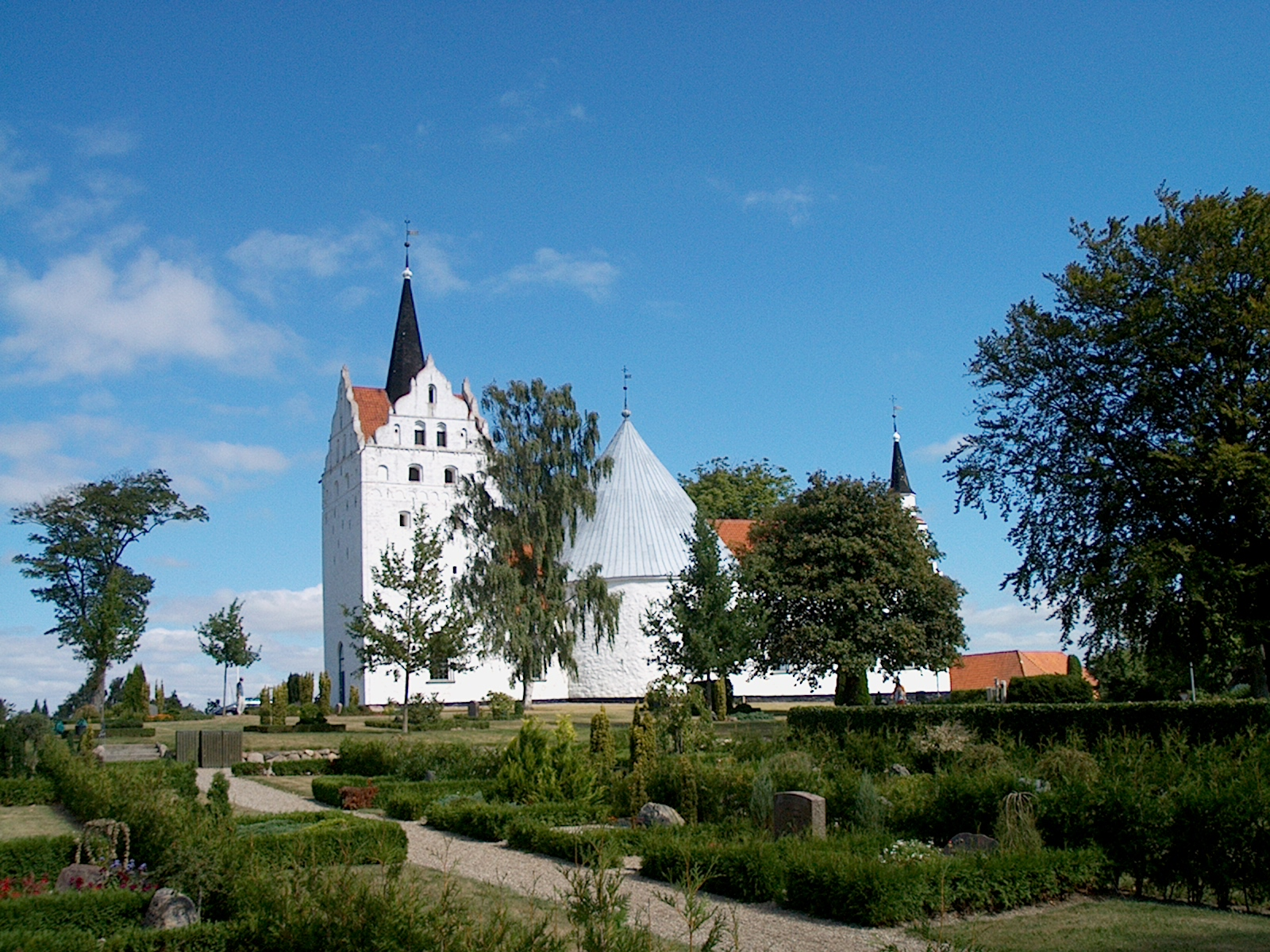
- Horne Church

- Location within Region of Southern Denmark Location within Denmark
- Coordinates: 55°6′26″N 10°10′4″E
- Country: Denmark
- Region: Southern Denmark
- Municipality: Faaborg-Midtfyn

Population (2026)
  - Total: 867

Horne is a village, with a population of 867 (1 January 2026), in Faaborg-Midtfyn Municipality, Region of Southern Denmark on the island of Funen in Denmark.

Horne Church, the only round church on Funen, is located in the village.
