= Evangeliary of Notker =

The Evangeliary of Notker, the decorated front cover

The Evangeliary of Notker is an evangeliary written around 930 and preserved within a richly decorated bookbinding.

The text of the evangeliary dates from around 930. It is traditionally believed to have been produced during the bishopric of Notker of Liège (c. 940 – 1080), and made as a gift for the Collegiate Church of St John the Evangelist in Liège. The front cover of the binding of the manuscript is elaborately decorated. It consists of three elements. In the centre, there is an ivory panel depicting a kneeling figure offering a book to Christ, depicted as Christ in Majesty within a mandorla. This ivory panel is sometimes referred to as the "Notker ivory" and is dated to the late 10th century. The cover is also decorated with eight enamel plaques from the 1160s, and finally four gilded, geometrical decorations that were added in the 15th century. Adjustments have also been made in later centuries. The evangeliary is classified as an important heritage object of French Community of Belgium (French: Trésor de la Fédération Wallonie-Bruxelles) and is kept and displayed in the Curtius Museum in Liège.
