= Evangeliary of Averbode =

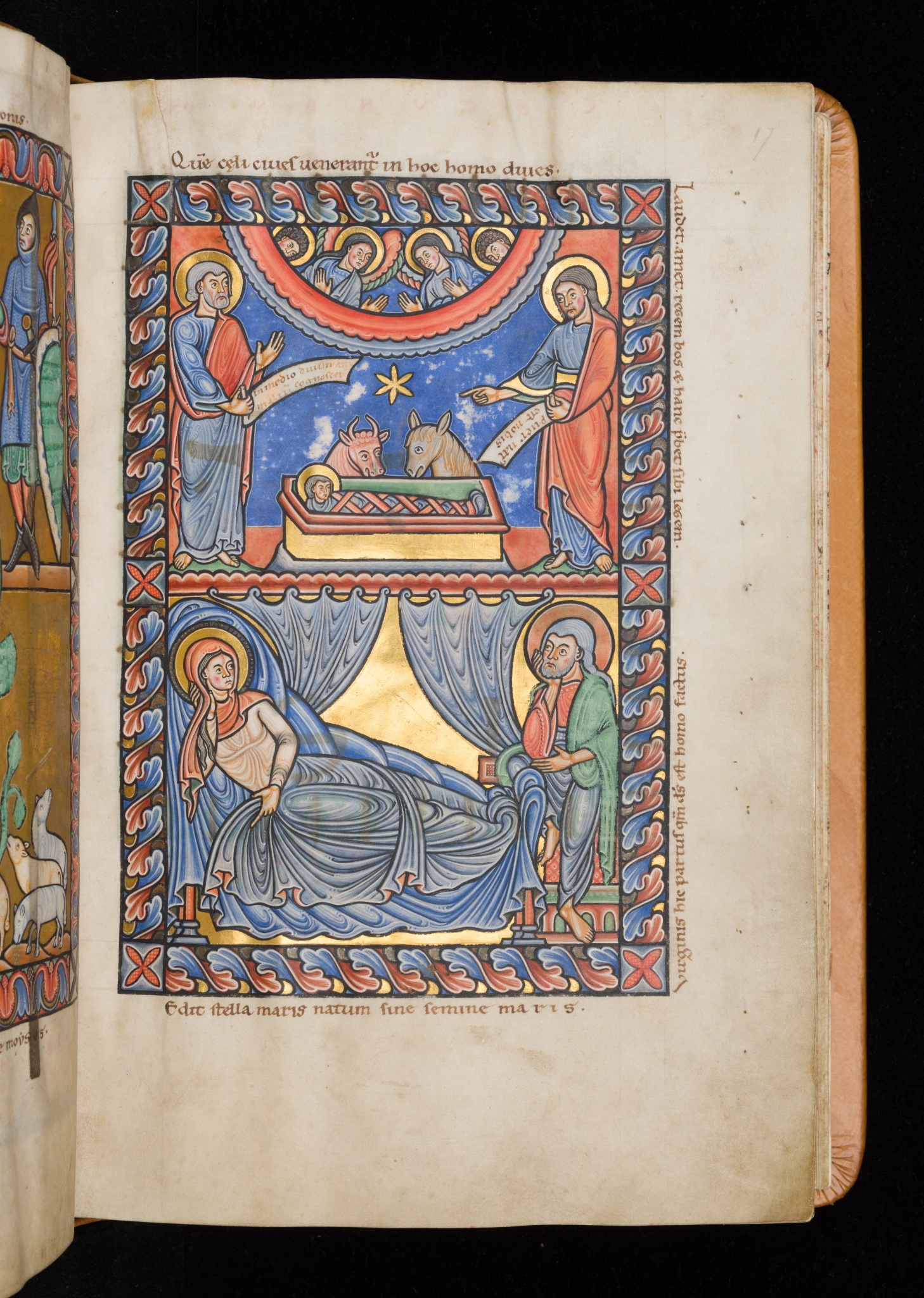
Nativity, one of the full-page miniatures of the Evangeliary of Averbode

The Evangeliary of Averbode (French: Évangéliaire d'Averbode) is an illuminated manuscript, an evangeliary created in the region of the Meuse river between 1150 and 1175. The manuscript is named after Averbode Abbey in Belgium where it was kept in the 18th century. It is considered one of the finest examples of illuminated manuscripts within Mosan art. It belongs to the collections of the library of the University of Liège.

== Description ==
The manuscript page size is 27.7 x 19.2 cm. It has 173 pages. It is in the collection of the library of the University of Liège. It contains eight richly decorated full-page miniatures, and has been described as a masterpiece of Mosan art. Its binding is from the 20th century. It is formally classified as a part of the historical heritage of Wallonia.

== History ==
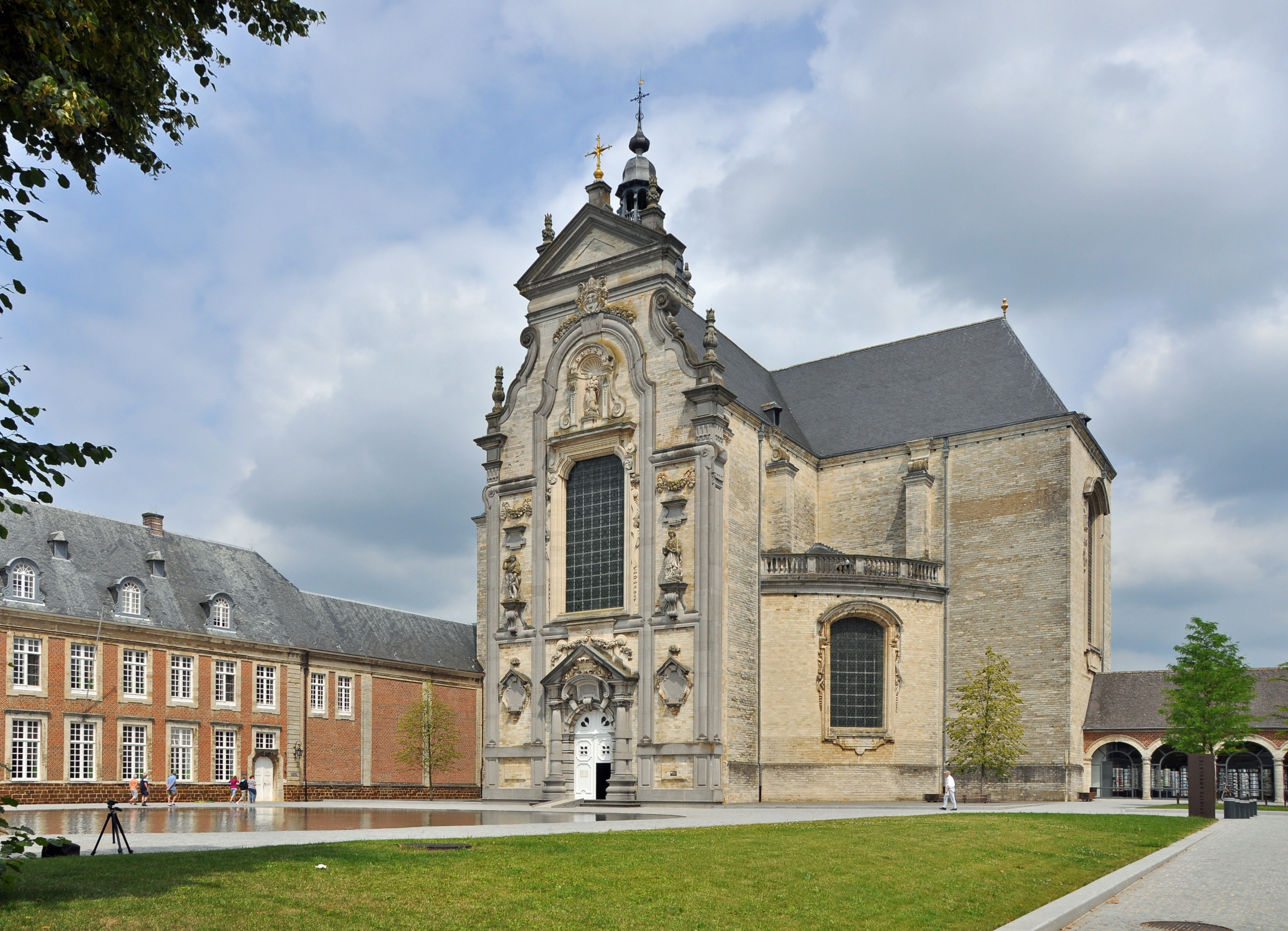
Averbode Abbey, where the book was kept before being donated to the University of Liège

The manuscript was produced between 1150 et 1175. It is named after the Averbode Abbey, where the manuscript was kept in the 18th century. The earlier fate of the manuscript is unknown, and it is not certain that it was commissioned for Averbode Abbey. Stylistically and iconographically it can however be grouped together with two other sumptuous illuminated manuscripts, created in the Prince-Bishopric of Liège during the second half of the 12th century: the Floreffe Bible (currently in the British Library) and the so-called Brussels Evangeliary (in the Royal Library of Belgium, Brussels). Its calendar contains the names of several saints particularly venerated in the area. The book was created in a time that the production of luxury evangeliaries decreased because liturgical Gospel readings were increasingly incorporated into Missals. Evangeliaries became increasingly of less importance in the art of Western Europe. This evangeliary is an exception to this trend. The book was donated to the University of Liège in 1821, after having been removed from Averbode Abbey before its suppression in 1796.
