= Evangeliary =

Book containing portions of the Gospel for public prayer in Catholicism

The Evangeliary or Book of the Gospels is a liturgical book containing only those portions of the four gospels which are read during Mass or in other public offices of the Church. The corresponding terms in Latin are Evangeliarium and Liber evangeliorum.

The Evangeliary developed from marginal notes in manuscripts of the Gospels and from lists of gospel readings (capitularia evangeliorum). Generally included at the beginning or end of the book containing the whole gospels, these lists indicated the days on which the various extracts or pericopes were to be read. They developed into books in which they were accompanied by the texts to which they referred, with the passages arranged in accordance with the liturgical year rather than in their order within the gospels themselves, and omitting passages not used in the liturgy.

== Terminology ==
The term "evangeliary" does not date back earlier than the 17th century, and refers to the collection of readings from the Acts of the Apostles. The Greeks themselves called such collections εὐαγγέλιον (evangélion, "the Gospel", literally "good message"), or ἐκλογάδιον τοῦ εὐαγγελίου (eklogádion toû evangelíou, "selections from the gospel").

In churches of the Latin Rite, the lessons from the Old Testament, the Epistles from the New Testament and portions of the Gospels are usually grouped in the same book, under the name Comes, Liber comitis, Liber comicus (from the Latin word comes, "companion"), or Lectionarium ("lectionary; book of reading"). Separate Evangeliaria are seldom to be met with in Latin. The name for a table indicating passages to be read, as well as the Sundays and Holy Days on which they are to be read is typically known as a Capitulary (capitularium), but may also be called an Evangelistary (evangelistarium), a name sometimes given to the Evangeliaria proper.

In the Eastern Orthodox liturgy, a similar role is filled by the Apostolos (Greek: Ἀπόστολος, Apóstolos), the Praxapostolos (Greek: Πραξαπόστολος, Praxapóstolos) and the Aprakos (Ἄπρακος, Áprakos).

The word "lectionary" is employed, however, to denote either the collection of passages from the Old and New Testaments, including the Gospels, or else these passages alone without the corresponding Gospels.

== Origin and use ==
Following the Jewish custom of the synagogue, the Scriptures of the Old Testament were read at the primitive Christian assemblies. According as the canon of the New Testament was decided on, certain extracts from it were included in these readings. The apologist St. Justin Martyr tells how in his day, when the Christians met together, they read the Memoirs of the Apostles and the writings of the Prophets (Apol., I, lxvii). Tertullian, Cyprian and other writers bear witness to the same custom; and in the West the clerical minor order of lector existed as early as the 3rd century.

For want of precise testimony, it is unknown how the particular passages were decided on. Most likely the presiding bishop chose them at the assembly itself; and on the occurrence of certain festivals the Scripture relating to them would be read. Little by little a more or less definite list would naturally result from this method. St. John Chrysostom in a homily delivered at Antioch exhorts his hearers to read beforehand the Scripture passages to be read and commented on in the Office of the day (Homilia de Lazaro, iii, c. i). In like manner other Churches would form a table of readings. In the margin of the manuscript text it was customary to note the Sunday or liturgical festival on which that particular passage would be read, and at the end of the manuscript, the list of such passages, the Synaxarium (Eastern name) or Capitulare (Western name), would be added. Transition from this process to the making of an Evangeliarium, or collection of all such passages, was easy. Gregory is of opinion that fragments of Evangeliaria in Greek dating from the fourth, fifth and sixth centuries are extant, and many from the ninth century onwards (according to Gregory they number 1072) are. In like manner, there are Lectionaries in the Latin Churches from as early as the fifth century. The Comes of the Roman Church dates from before St. Gregory the Great (P.L., XXX, 487-532). From the 10th century onwards there are the Gospel lessons, together with the Epistles and prayers, united in a new liturgical book, called the Missal.

== Manuscript Evangeliaria and the text of the New Testament ==
Manuscript Evangeliaria have little importance for the critic of the Gospel text. At the time when the various Gospel passages began to be collected in book form for use in liturgical reunions, the various families of the Gospel text and its translations were already in existence; and those Evangeliaria simply reproduce the particular text favoured by the Church which compiled it.

They have even exercised an unfortunate influence on the more recent manuscripts of the Gospels; certain additions of a liturgical nature (e.g., in illo tempore; dixit Dominus) which were set at the beginning or end of a reading, have found their way into the text itself. But in the official text of the Vulgate, and in modern editions of the Greek text, owing to the labours of bible scholars like Tischendorf, Westcott and Hort, these liturgical glosses are very rare. There is one example in the Vulgate text: Luke, vii, 31 (ait autem Dominus).

== Liturgy ==
Greek Evangeliaria are consistently organized in two parts, the first containing Sunday Gospels beginning with Easter, the second containing Gospels for saints' days beginning with 1 September. Western Evangeliaria vary more in format, due to the differences of usage in different rites.

== Ornamentation ==
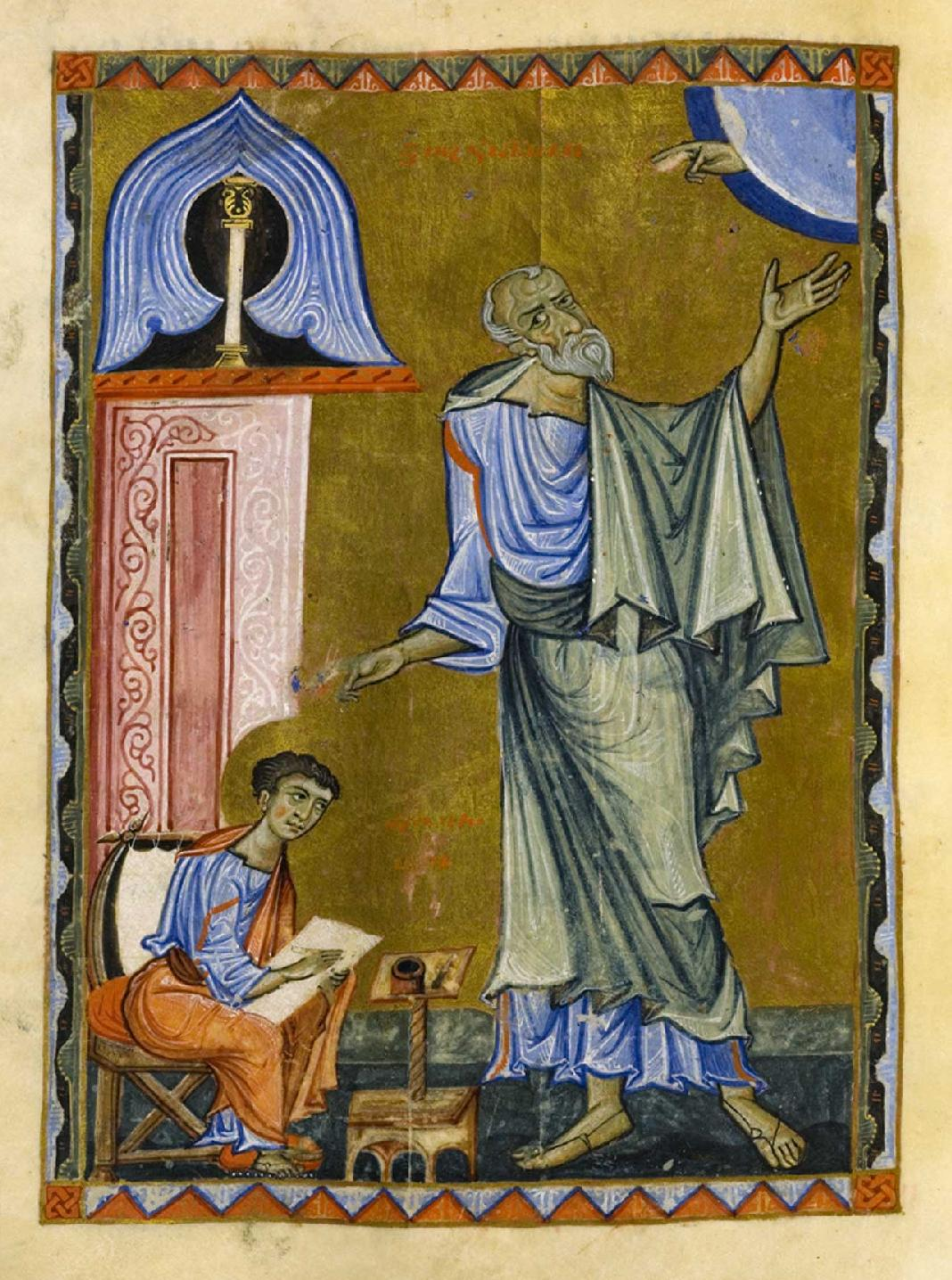
Miniature from the Armenian Skevra Evangeliary, c. 1198, National Library of Poland

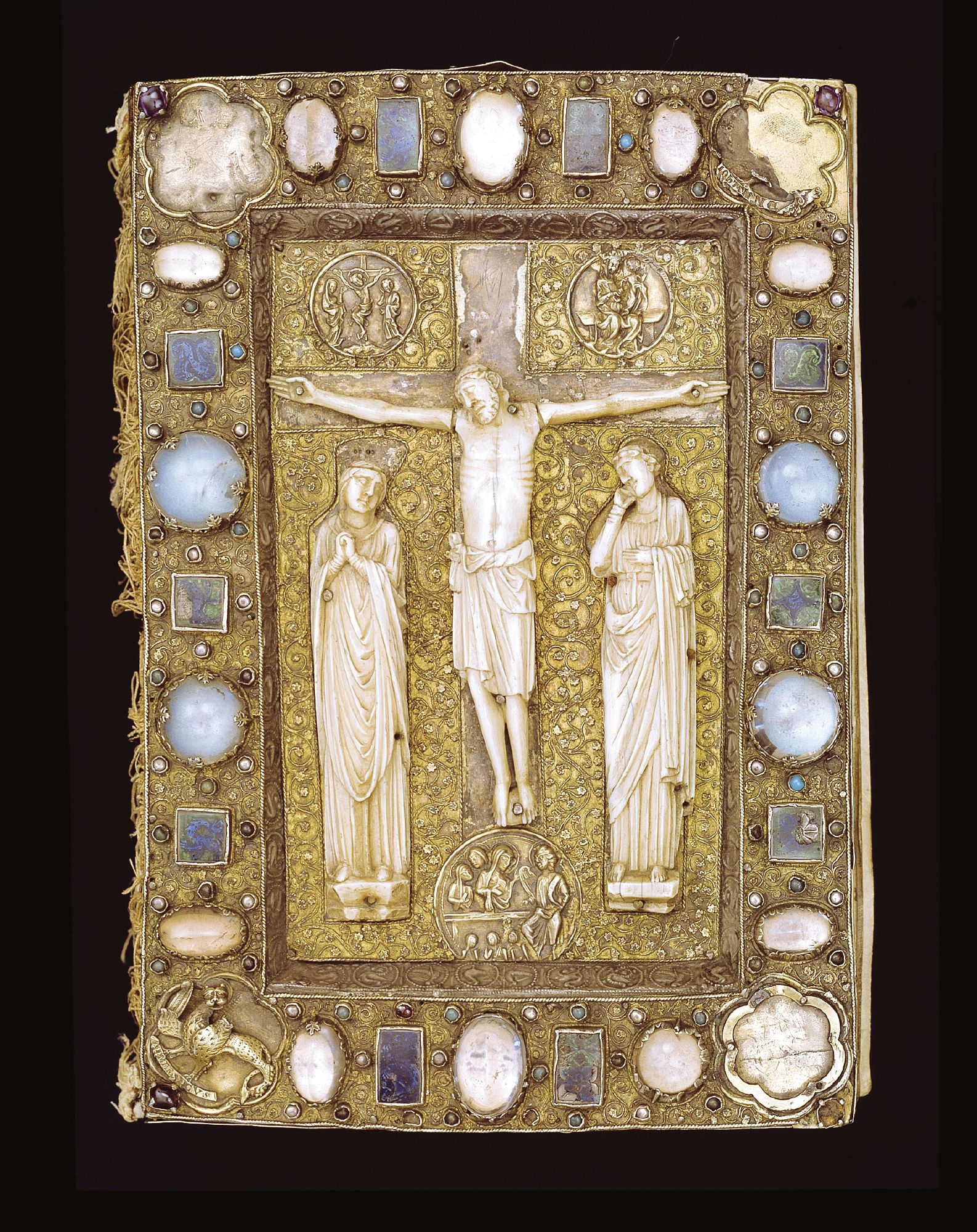
The richly decorated cover of the Horne Book (13th century) includes elements of carved walrus ivory.

From the beginning the books used in the liturgy, and more particularly the Gospel manuscripts, were highly venerated, and therefore text and cover were often richly ornamented. From an artistic point of view the distinction between Evangeliaria strictly so called and Gospel manuscripts is of little importance and is generally disregarded. It consists merely in the fact that the illuminations of the Evangeliaria occur as a rule at those passages set apart for the greater festivals of the year. The coronation oath-book of Anglo-Saxon kings, which King Athelstan received apparently from his brother-in-law Otto I, and in turn presented to the cathedral church of Canterbury, is ornamented with figures of the Evangelists freely copied from those that adorn the Evangeliarium of Charlemagne preserved at Vienna. Gospels in rolls are known only from seeing them in miniatures, especially as emblems of the Four Evangelists, until well into the Middle Ages.

The roll of the Book of Joshua (9th-10th century: Vatican Library) is a specimen of what Evangeliaria in this form with miniatures were like. The roll form remained long in use for liturgical manuscripts at Milan and in southern Italy.

Costly Evangeliaria have been noted by some for their clear and careful writing. They have helped to perpetuate and propagate certain styles of calligraphy.

The Greek uncial (lettering type) is used in many manuscripts of the 9th and 10th centuries; and the Latin uncial is also employed, especially in Gaul, far into the Middle Ages for Gospel and liturgical works. The copying of the Gospels influenced largely the writings of Irish and Anglo-Saxon scribes, and effected the spread of these characters over the European continent and the development of the Caroline minuscule and the semi-uncial of the school of Tours. The copyists of the Gospels made great use of other helps to beautify their penmanship, such as the use of purple parchment, liquid gold and silver and various coloured inks. The part played by Evangeliaria in the history of miniature painting until the twelfth and thirteenth centuries is very great. Especially noteworthy are the miniature insets to the Canons of Eusebius, or tables of Gospel concordance. Illuminated initial letters differed according to the various schools of writing; the Irish scribes used artistic knots and loops, the Merovingian and Lombard writers preferred animal forms, especially fish.

Illuminated scenes, of interest to the iconographist, are often to be met in these copies of the Gospel text. Frequently it is the figure of the Evangelist that stands at the head of his Gospel; the donor, or rather a sketch showing the donation of the book, is often found in miniatures from the days of Charlemagne to the end of the Middle Ages. The prince is shown receiving from the hands of the abbot the Evangeliarium he will use whenever he assists at the holy offices in the abbey church (e.g. the picture of Charles the Bald in the Vivien Bible, Bibliothèque Nationale, Paris). But in the 10th and 11th centuries the prince is shown offering the precious manuscript to Christ or to the patron saint of the church or abbey (cf. the Evangeliarium at Bamberg State Library showing the Emperor Henry II offering the book to Christ).

== Precious examples ==
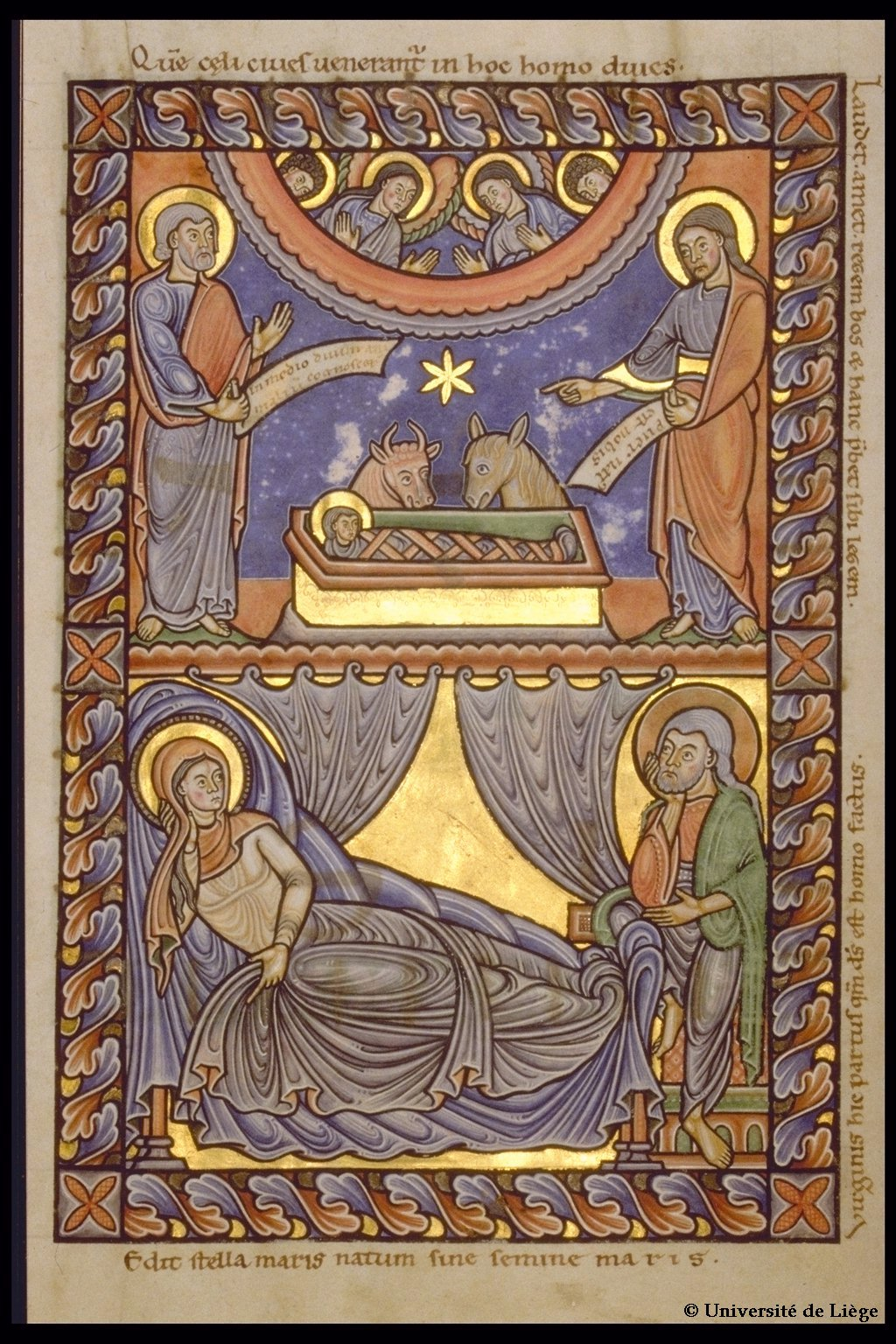
Nativity, one of the full-page miniatures of the Evangeliary of Averbode

Famous Evangeliaria include:

- the portion of an Evangeliarium from Sinope (6th century: in the Bibliothèque Nationale, Paris)
- the Syrian codices of Rabbula (586, at Florence) and Etschmiadzin (miniatures of the 6th century)
- the Evangeliarium of Gregory I (at Cambridge) in Latin uncials
- the Irish-Continental Evangeliaria of St. Gall (about 800)
- the Carolingian Evangeliarium of Godescalc (about 782, in the Bibliothèque Nationale, Paris)
- the Ada Codex (9th century, at Trier)
- the Evangeliarium of Echternach (10th century, at Gotha)
- the Evangeliarium of the Abbess Uta (about 1002, at Munich)
- the Evangeliary of Notker (c. 930)
- the Evangeliary of Averbode (second half of the 12th century)
- the Horne Book (13th century)

Valuable Evangeliaria were carefully treasured, and when used in the offices were placed on a strip of cloth or on a cushion. The back leaf of the binding was usually left plain, but the front cover was enriched with all the skill of the goldsmith. One of the most ancient bindings or covers known is that offered by the Lombard Queen Theodelinda (600) to the cathedral of Monza. At times plaques of ivory, resembling diptychs, were set into these bindings. The earliest of them were of Oriental or Italian origin, and bear isolated figures of Christ or the Blessed Virgin, etc. A number of them, to be found in the countries along the Rhine and the Meuse and in Northern France (10th and 11th centuries), have the scene of the Crucifixion.
