= Horne Church =

Coordinates: 55°6′22.2″N 10°10′26.8″E

- Horne Kirke
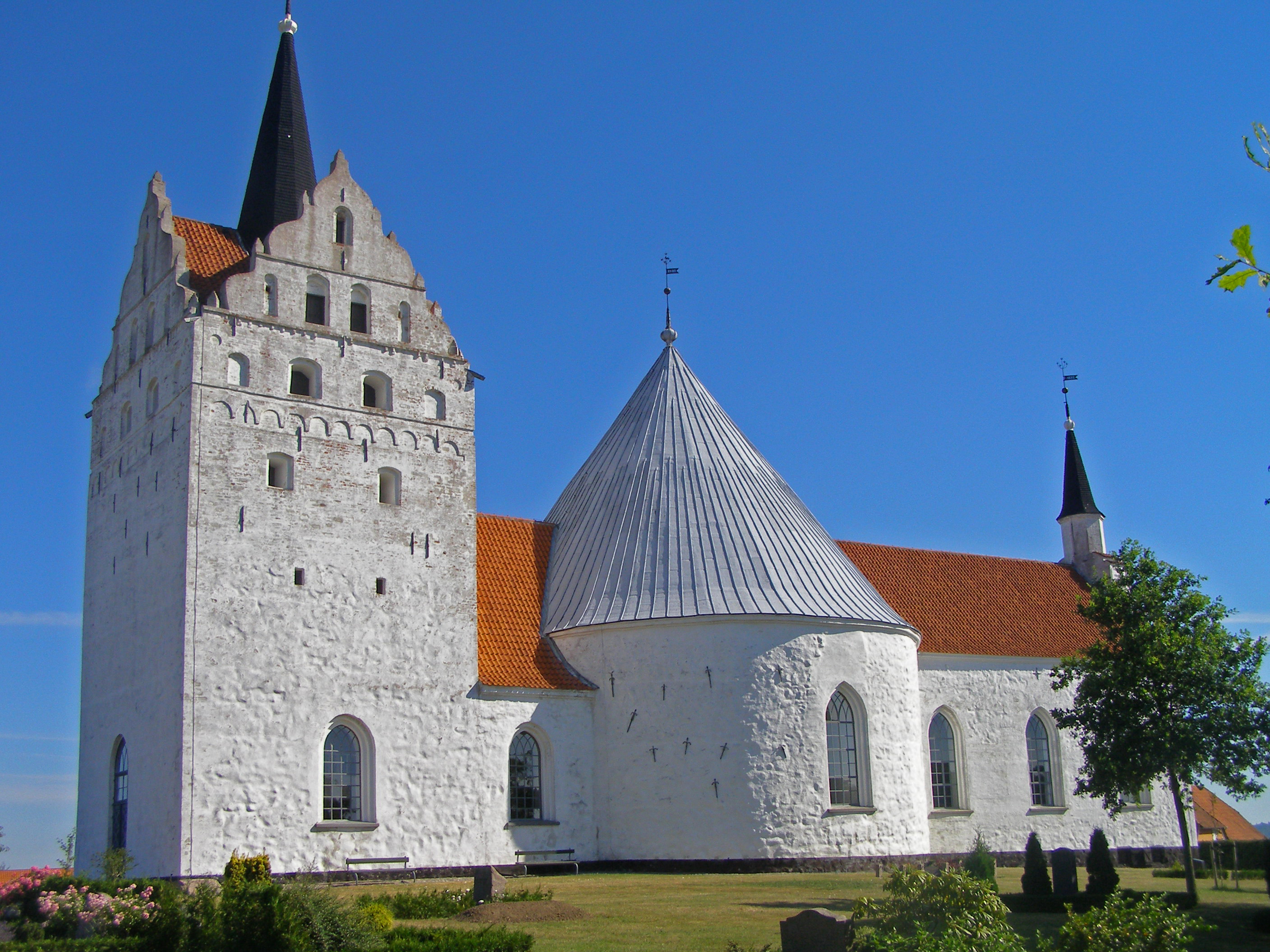
- Horne Church
- Location: Faaborg, Denmark
- Denomination: Church of Denmark
- Website: hornepraesten.d

Architecture
- Completed: c. 1100

Administration
- Diocese: Diocese of Funen
- Parish: Horne Sogn

Horne Church (Danish: Horne Kirke) was established in the Late Middle Ages on the southwest part of the island of Funen, Denmark. This church, founded as a Catholic place of worship, is situated in the village of Horne. The church no longer serves as a Catholic parish; it now belongs to the lutheran Church of Denmark. Horne Church is the only round church on Funen. Originally constructed from granite stonework, it was modified in the 15th century with the addition of Gothic extensions on the east and west.

The history of Horne Church is inextricably tied to Hvedholm Manor, located about 2 km (1.2 mi) to the south and to the noble family Brahe associated with that estate. Several of the church's content items date from the 17th century and earlier; one of the original possessions is a medieval evangeliary known as the Horne Book, a national treasure of Denmark that is held by the National Museum of Denmark in Copenhagen.

== Architecture ==
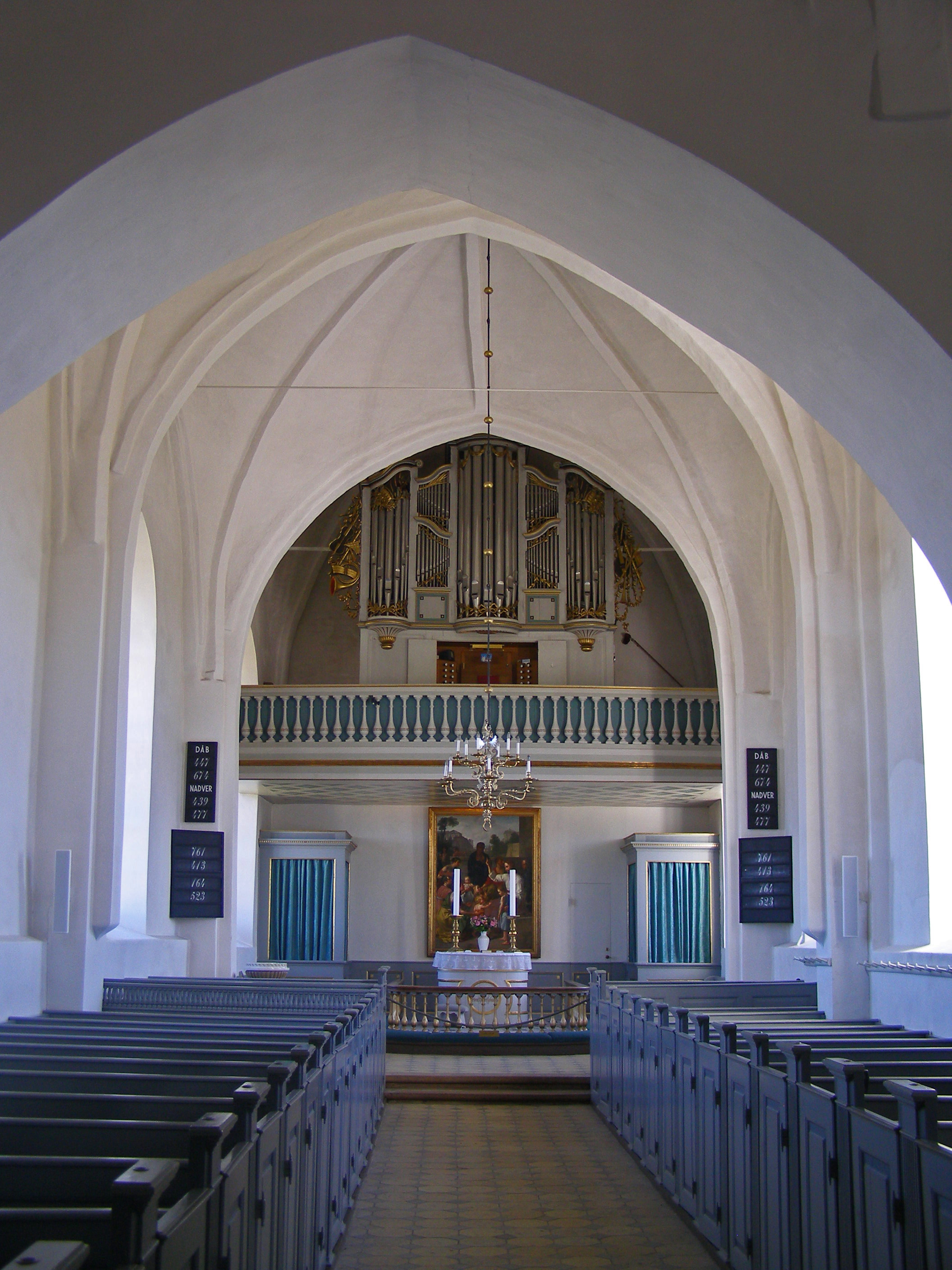
Horne Church interior.

The original central round church is a ponderous looking medieval structure, attached to which are the rectilinear east and west wings. The alignment of these later extensions was not quite set at 180 degrees, so that the resulting central interior aisle does not split the congregation pews evenly, and the traditional women's side is more spacious than the men's. The circular roof of the massive central tower is constructed of lead panels, which forms an interesting colour and texture contrast to the orange-red roof tiling of the remainder. The exterior stonework has been covered over by many layers of white paint, giving a look of an almost harled coating.

There are three interesting and delicately designed weather vanes atop the church, one at the apex of each of the vaulted circular towers, but each at a different height. On one of the vanes are the initials P.B.B. (Preben Bille Brahe) to denote the association of the Brahe family of Hvedholm. The church tower bells are dated to 1568 and 1613.

The curved lines of the gables of the taller western square tower reveal the Renaissance character of that element. These gables attain a height of 32.4 m (106 ft), and are the highest element other than the west circular tower. The entry porch displays the Vicars' Plaque, bearing the date 1472.

The interior features a granite baptismal font, one of the oldest interior remains from the Middle Ages construction, matching the exterior stonework. The pulpit, of French Empire influence, is situated within the central round original church because of the elongated congregation seating. Perhaps the most interesting interior feature is situated at the upper level near the pulpit: a special box for the noble Brahe family, called the "Count's Box". This box was constructed at the behest of the earlier mentioned Preben Bille Brahe and is designed almost identically to those boxes of the Royal Danish Theatre. The nephew of Bille Brahe was astronomer Tycho Brahe, who was reared by his uncle and would have sat in this box on Sundays as a child. Not only did the Brahe nobility have its privileged seating, but the Brahe servants had their own private upper level box, called the "Tjenerloftet" or "Servants' Loft". The interior has a painted wood coffered ceiling under the organ gallery.

== Church contents ==
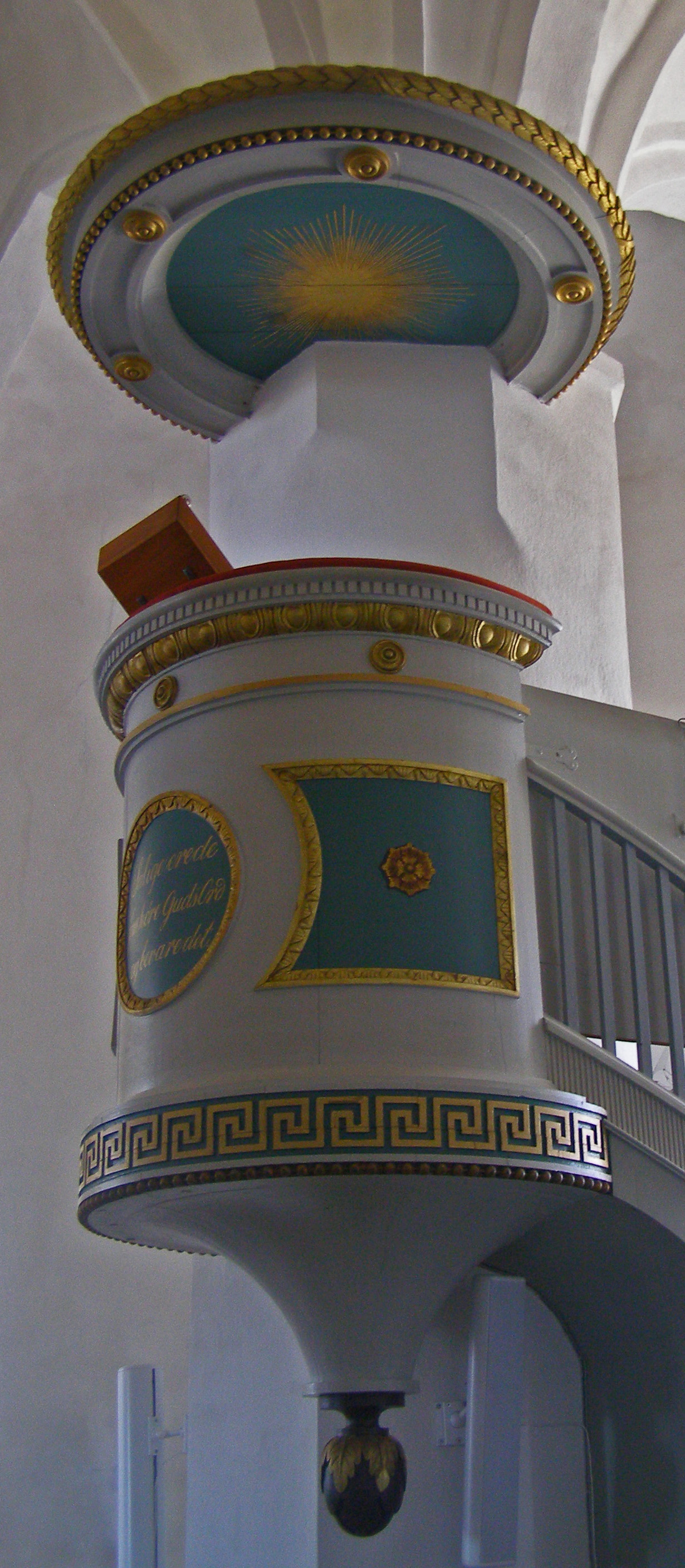
Horne Church pulpit.

Beside the original granite baptismal font now situated within the entrance porch is an intentionally uncomfortable bench called the "kællingbænken", or "hags' bench". The present baptismal font is believed to be the work of Bertel Thorvaldsen; however, the font was loaned out in the early 20th century, and no one is able to tell whether the Thorvaldsen font was returned or a similar one from Svanninge. Other yet older treasures of the church are the ciborium from 1639 and the chalice from 1676. The bronze candlesticks dating to 1640 are another special holding.

== Area setting ==
Horne Church is situated in a countryside of gently rolling hills, most of which is utilized for grain cultivation and cattle grazing. It sits atop a knoll at the north side of the village of Horne, and it is quite visible from many aspects for up to 5 km (3.1 mi) from certain vantage points. Hvedholm Manor, a building historically related through the Brahe family, is located about 3 km (1.9 mi) to the east. The Bøjden Nor is a bird sanctuary about 5 km (3.1 mi) distant where over 50 bird species in a flat meadow can be observed from a hide. Behind the altar is hung the oil painting Jesus and the Little Children by Christoffer Wilhelm Eckersberg.

== See also ==
- Egeskov Castle
- Renaissance architecture
- Tycho Brahe
