= Waldemar Lindgren =

Swedish-American economic geologist

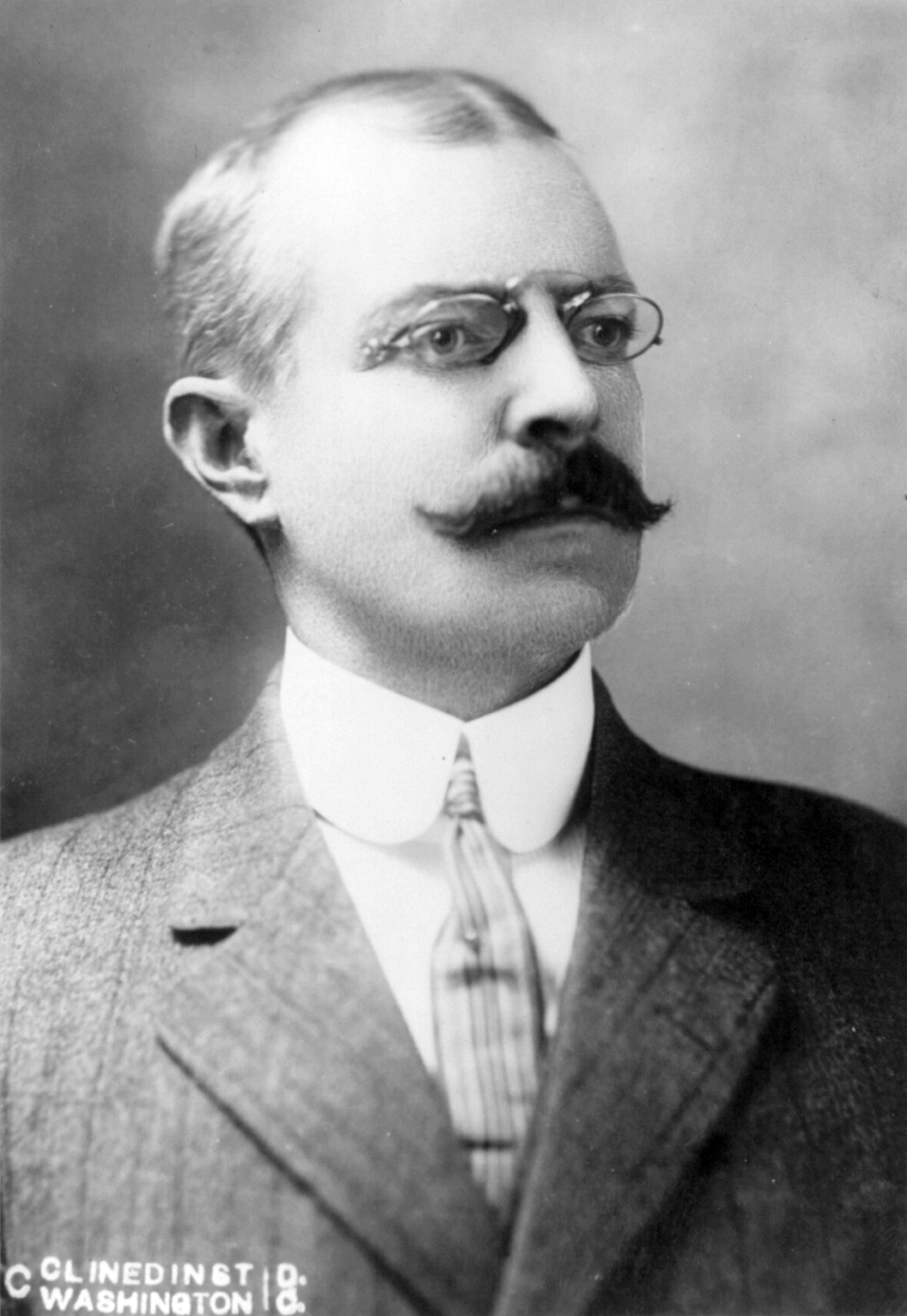
Lindgren in 1912

Waldemar Lindgren (February 14, 1860 – November 3, 1939) was a Swedish-American geologist and a founder of modern economic geology.

== Life ==
Lindgren was born in Vassmolösa, Kalmar Municipality, Småland, Sweden, the son of Johan and Emma Lindgren. Johan was a judge and member of parliament, Emma the daughter of a clergyman. He attended the Freiberg Mining Academy, Germany, graduating as a mining engineer in 1882.

In 1884, Lindgren began a 31-year career with the U.S. Geological Survey, working on ore deposits in the Rocky Mountains. In 1905, he helped found the journal Economic Geology. In 1912, he was appointed head of the Department of Geology at the Massachusetts Institute of Technology.

Lindgren was elected to the United States National Academy of Sciences in 1909, the American Academy of Arts and Sciences in 1912, and the American Philosophical Society in 1917. He was elected a foreign member of the Royal Swedish Academy of Sciences in 1931. He was a fellow of the Mineralogical Society of America. He was president of the Geological Society of America in 1924 (winning its Penrose Medal in 1933) and of the Society of Economic Geologists (winning its Penrose Gold Medal in 1928).

Lindgren's published writings run to nearly 200 titles, not counting discussions, reviews, and more than 1,000 abstracts. Most are on the great ore deposits. Editions of Mineral Deposits, his widely used textbook, were published in 1913, 1919, 1928 and 1933.

Lindgren died in 1939 in Brighton, Boston.

== Publications ==
- The Gold-quartz Veins of Nevada City and Grass Valley Districts, California (U.S. Government Printing Office. 1896.)
- The Gold Belt of the Blue Mountains of Oregon Extract from the 22nd Annual Report (1900–1901) Part 2: Ore Deposits (U.S. Geological Survey. 1902. pages 553–776)
- The water resources of Molokai, Hawaiian Islands (US Geological Survey Water-Supply Paper No. 77. 1903. 62 pages)
- The copper deposits of the Clifton-Morenci district, Arizona (US Geological Survey Professional Paper No. 43. 1905. 375 pages)
- Geology and gold deposits of the Cripple Creek District, Colorado. (Lindgren, W., & Ransome, F. L. US Geological Survey Professional Paper No. 54. 1906. 516 pages)
- The ore deposits of New Mexico (Lindgren, W., Graton, L. C., Schrader, F. C., & Hill, J. M. US Geological Survey Professional Paper No. 68 1910. 361 pages)
- The Tertiary Gravels of the Sierra Nevada of California (US Geological Survey Professional Paper No. 73. 1911. 226 pages)
- Mineral Deposits (New York, McGraw-Hill. 1913)
