= Steve Brown (yo-yo player) =

American professional yo-yo performer

- Born: February 20, 1976; Jacksonville, Florida, U.S.
- Occupations: Yo-yo designer and competition judge
- Known for: Creating freehand yo-yo play

Steve Brown (born 1976) is an American competitive yo-yo player, competition judge, yo-yo designer, and yoyo blogger currently based out of North Olmsted, Ohio. He is currently the editor for YoYoNews.com and a co-producer of the Triple Crown of YoYo events. In 2001, the National Yo-Yo League named him as one of eight National Yo-Yo masters. He has designed multiple yo-yos, including the "Cherry Bomb" for Team Losi. While employed by Duncan Toys Company as marketing and promotions coordinator, Brown invented and patented freehand yo-yo play where instead of being attached to the finger, the string is actually attached to a counterweight, and designed a line of yo-yos for the new style. He also authored a book called Duncan Yo-Yo Trick Book while employed by the company.

A regular competitor in the 1990s, he has moved out of competing in most venues and has shifted his focus to judging. His skill with yo-yos also landed him a job as a stuntman on the 2001 movie Zoolander, work as a consultant on "The Lone Ranger (2013 film)" where he developed and taught several of the actors the pocket watch trick that features prominently in the film, and led to an appearance on The Best Damn Sports Show Period.

== Biography ==
Steve Brown was young when he first held a yo-yo, but as a child, took little interest in the few tricks he learned. It was not until his later years and after some instability in his life that he got serious about yo-yoing. Brown was looking for a job at the time when came back to the yo-yo trade. Finding himself in a job of assembling yo-yo's for Lofty Pursuits, he was thrown into retail one day, making a huge impression on his customers and his boss, Greg Cohen. He impressed everyone with not only his ability to yo-yo, but also to juggle, showing his multitude of talents.

After working the next two years with his independent cart, fine-tuning his yo-yo skills through hours of practice, Brown joined with Duncan Toys Company. Working as Duncan's marketing and promotions coordinator, Steve created a following with his creative designs and yo-yo tricks.

Brown worked for Duncan Toys for the start of his career. He worked for Duncan for seven years (1999–2006), where his unique style and flare created a name for himself. Brown was, and is, known for his punk rocker sense of style that he has brought to the yo-yo world. At contests early in his career, his unique style and accompanying punk rock music helped him to stand out among the other competitors who were either significantly older or significantly younger.

After leaving Duncan Toys in 2006, and finding less time to spend yo-yoing with age and a newly established family, Brown kept himself active in the yo-yo community by creating his website 365yoyotricks.com, on which he recorded and posted one original yo-yo trick every day for an entire year in 2011. The following year, Steve outsourced some of the tricks from a few of his favorite yo-yoers, but continued to contribute tricks of his own alongside them. He continued this system in 2013 with a different group of players, but this is no longer an active sight, since Brown stopped posts to the site in 2013. Currently, he works as an editor on another website called yoyonews.com. Here he works to keep the yo-yo community alive, and persisting towards creativity. Alongside the creation of his websites, Brown was also sponsored by the Yo-Yo Factory, where they created four specific yo-yo models inspired by / for Brown.

Now, Brown resides in Cleveland, Ohio with his three kids. He currently works on Yoyonews, keeping up on current yo-yo trends and events all over. In addition to this, he works on the Triple Crown of Yo-yo event, which occurs every year, except in 2015, due to the birth of Brown's youngest child. He also works at the Caribou Lodge Yo-yo Works. There he serves as the team and marketing manager, creating yo-yo's with creative, abstract designs. He has obtained a patent for his yo-yo design involving counterweights. Since Steve himself started off using plain wood yo-yo's, he dedicates this site and company to creating a unique image for the yo-yo community while maintaining a signature old school style that Brown has been recognized for throughout his career. Along with hand crafted yo-yo's, they also produce a limited clothing line and offer video tutorials on their website.

== Competitive Record ==
Steve Brown has won many awards throughout his career in competitive yo-yoing. He has participated in many different contests and championships, and currently holds various titles and placed in several yo-yo competitions. To current date, Steve Brown's competitive records include:

- 1996 World Yo-Yo Contest, 4th place
- 1997 World Yo-Yo Contest - Single A, 4th place
- 1997 World Yo-Yo Contest - Single A freestyle, 3rd place
- 1998 World Yo-Yo Contest - Single A freestyle, 4th place
  - The World Yo-Yo Contest is the most prestigious Yo-Yo competition in the world. The competition is run by the International Yo-Yo Federation or (IYYF) and the host nations Yo-Yo organization. As of 2015 there are 33 countries that participate in the competition. There are more than 1000 yo-yo players and fans that come together to battle for the title of champion. There are six different types of categories for the players to compete in to get the gold medal. The rules are that there is a 30-second wild card, then a one-minute preliminary, after that a 90-second semi-final, then finally a 3-minute final to decide the winner.
- 1999 Bay Area Classic Invitational - Freestyle, 1st place:
  - During the 1999 Bay Area Classic Invitational, not only did Steve Brown win first place, but also was the first person to use/create the Freehand yo-yo technique. This technique has since caught on as an exciting yo-yo trick that may be hard for some to master. The freehand technique is executed by putting a small weight on the end of the string, near the space where your hand is placed and there is no other physical change added to the yo-yo. Steve Brown, the creator of this technique, has created a now popular style of competitive yo-yoing that is exciting to watch and difficult to master. Freehand easily shows each person's style who executes this move.
- 2001 Bay Area Classic Invitational - Freestyle, 1st place
  - During the 2001 Bay Area Classic Invitational, Steve Brown took first place in the competition. What made this win special was that Brown competed in this competition while being blindfolded. After the Invitational was over, Brown was then asked to never enter or participate in this event again.
- 2001 National Yo-Yo Master Award Recipient.
  - This award is only given to a select few that have shown their dedication and contributions to the sport. It is not a yearly award and the recipients are chosen from the masters.
- 2004 Donald F. Duncan Family Award for Industry Excellence Recipient.
  - This award is given annually from the US National Yo-Yo Museum during the National Yo-Yo contest to an individual for quality of innovation, production or promotion that helps advance the sport.
- 2007 Yo-Yo Contest - Five A - 10th place
- 2011 Trick Innovator of the Year Award.
  - Given annually from the US National Yo-Yo Museum during the US National Yo-Yo contest to an individual that has developed or created influential new Yo-Yo tricks over the year.

Steve Brown has now retired from being a competitive yo-yo player, but has continued on to be a judge in numerous different competitions around the world.
