= Boholmarna =

- Location within Kalmar Location within Sweden
- Coordinates: 56°39′N 16°18′E
- Country: Sweden
- Province: Småland
- County: Kalmar County
- Municipality: Kalmar Municipality

Area
  - Total: 0.47 km^{2} (0.18 sq mi)

Population (31 December 2010)
  - Total: 297
  - Density: 635/km^{2} (1,640/sq mi)
- Time zone: UTC+1 (CET)
  - Summer (DST): UTC+2 (CEST)

Boholmarna is a locality situated in Kalmar Municipality, Kalmar County, Sweden with 297 inhabitants in 2010. It consists of several islands.
