= Duno =

Duno may refer to:

== People ==
- José Duno (born 1977), Venezuelan football player
- Milka Duno (born 1972), Venezuelan race car driver
- Romero Duno (born 1995), Filipino boxer

== Places ==
- Duno, Lombardy, a village in the province of Varese, northern Italy
- Dunö, Kalmar County, Sweden

== Organizations ==
- Duno College, former name of Dorenweerd College
- DUNO, Dutch football club

== See also ==
- Duno-, prefix meaning fort in many toponyms, derived from dun
