= Bengt Berg =

Bengt Berg may refer to:

- Bengt Berg (footballer), Swedish former footballer
- Bengt Berg (ornithologist) (1885–1967), Swedish ornithologist, zoologist, wildlife photographer and writer
- Bengt Berg (poet) (born 1946), Swedish poet and politician
