= Proof of purchase =

Proof of purchase is often required for sales promotions and manufacturer rebates as evidence that the customer purchased the product. When multiple purchases are required to redeem these rewards, it is referred to as a premium incentive or collector mechanic. A proof of purchase is also required for some product recalls.

Traditional proof of purchase systems require the consumer to send some portion of the packaging, as defined by the product's manufacturer, along with a register receipt or sales invoice proving the product's purchase, with the latter being required for a product return to a retailer. An internal confirmation or tracking number may also be accepted as a proof of purchase, depending on the circumstances.

For a defective product such as an optical disc containing a film or musical album, the company will ask for the return of the defective media in order to facilitate an even exchange with one that properly works, or for the box proof and receipt (or often, a cardboard tab with several proofs separately perforated, to not compromise the packaging's integrity) to send back an item (such as a board game piece or pawn, or guide) inadvertently mispacked without it in the original packaging.

Unique codes printed on packaging are increasingly used as a mechanism for proof of purchase. Consumers can submit the code electronically for validation against a central database, thus establishing proof of purchase. Such systems allow manufacturers to develop a direct relationship with the consumer, for use in short term sales promotions, loyalty systems and collection and profiling of consumer data.

== See also ==
- Donald F. Duncan, Sr. — premium incentive inventor
