= Donald Duncan =

Donald Duncan or Don Duncan may refer to:

- Donald B. Duncan (1896–1975), American naval officer
- Donald W. Duncan (1930–2009), American soldier and anti-war activist
- Donald F. Duncan Sr. (1892–1971), American toy manufacturer and inventor
- Donald Keith Duncan, Jamaican dental surgeon and politician
- Donald A. Duncan, American swimming coach

== See also ==
- Joe Don Duncan (born 1990), American football player
- Duncan (surname)
