= Hagby Church, Småland =

Coordinates: 56°33′16″N 16°10′36″E

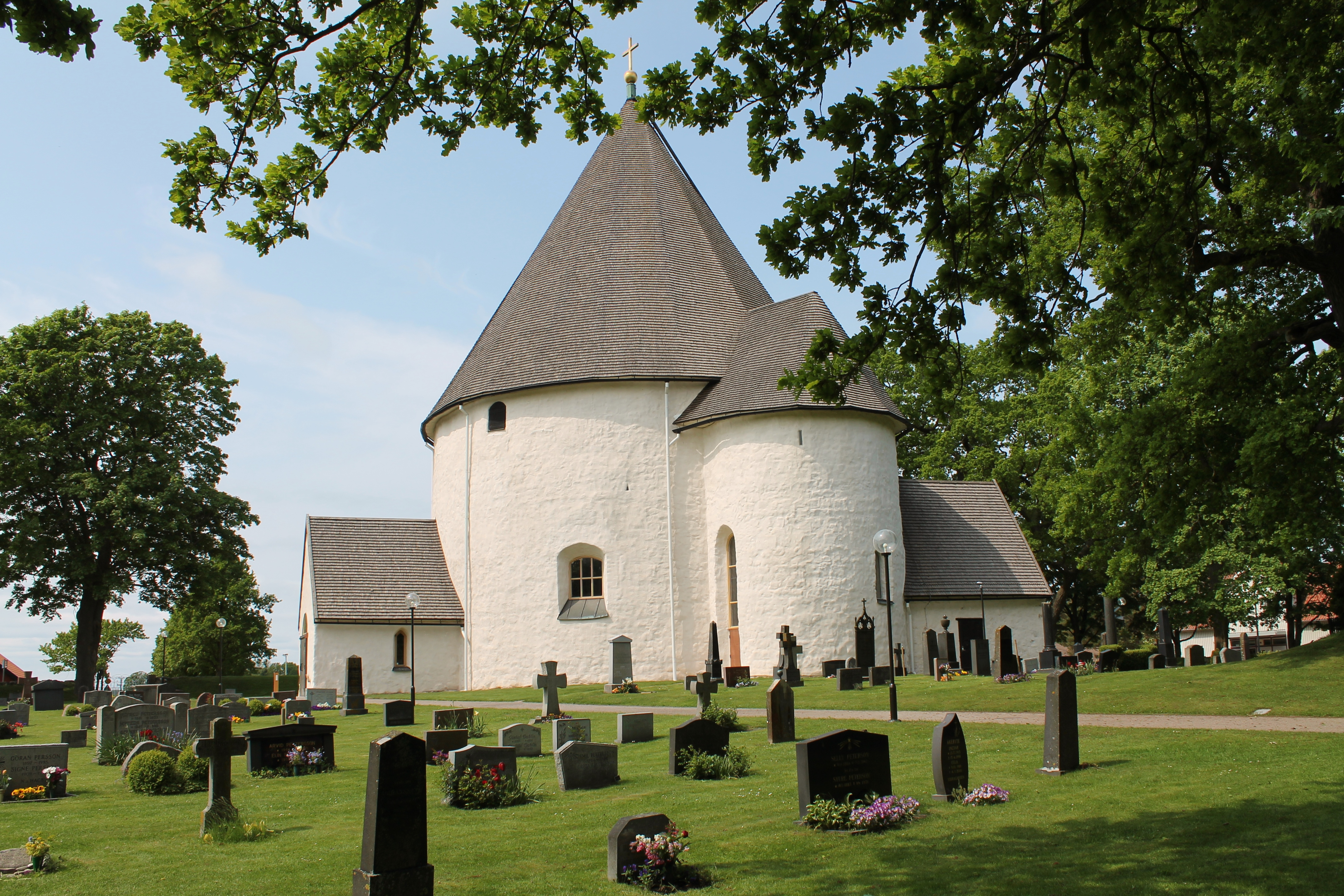
Hagby Church, view of the exterior

Hagby Church (Swedish: Hagby kyrka) is a medieval round church in Hagby, Kalmar County in Sweden. It belongs to the Diocese of Växjö.

== History and architecture ==
Hagby Church dates from the late 12th century. It was preceded by a wooden chapel dedicated to Saint Sigfrid of Sweden a few kilometres south of the present church; by 1541 it was abandoned. The present church was dedicated to Saint Olaf during the Catholic era .

The church was built in a round shape to serve both a religious purpose and a defensive one, i.e. it was a fortified church. 17 arrowslits have been identified in the upper part of the wall. The interior layout has changed considerably through the centuries. Originally it consisted of two floors, a basement floor and an upper floor that served as the church proper. The present layout of the church largely dates from a renovation carried out in 1968.

Inside the church, there are fragments of frescos from the 14th century on the walls. The church contains a wooden crucifix from the 16th century and a baptismal font of Gotlandic limestone. The pulpit dates from the 1760s. A silver chalice and paten dating from the 16th century were found under the church floor during a renovation in 1889, and are today part of the collections of the Swedish History Museum.
