= Trekanten, Sweden =

Trekanten
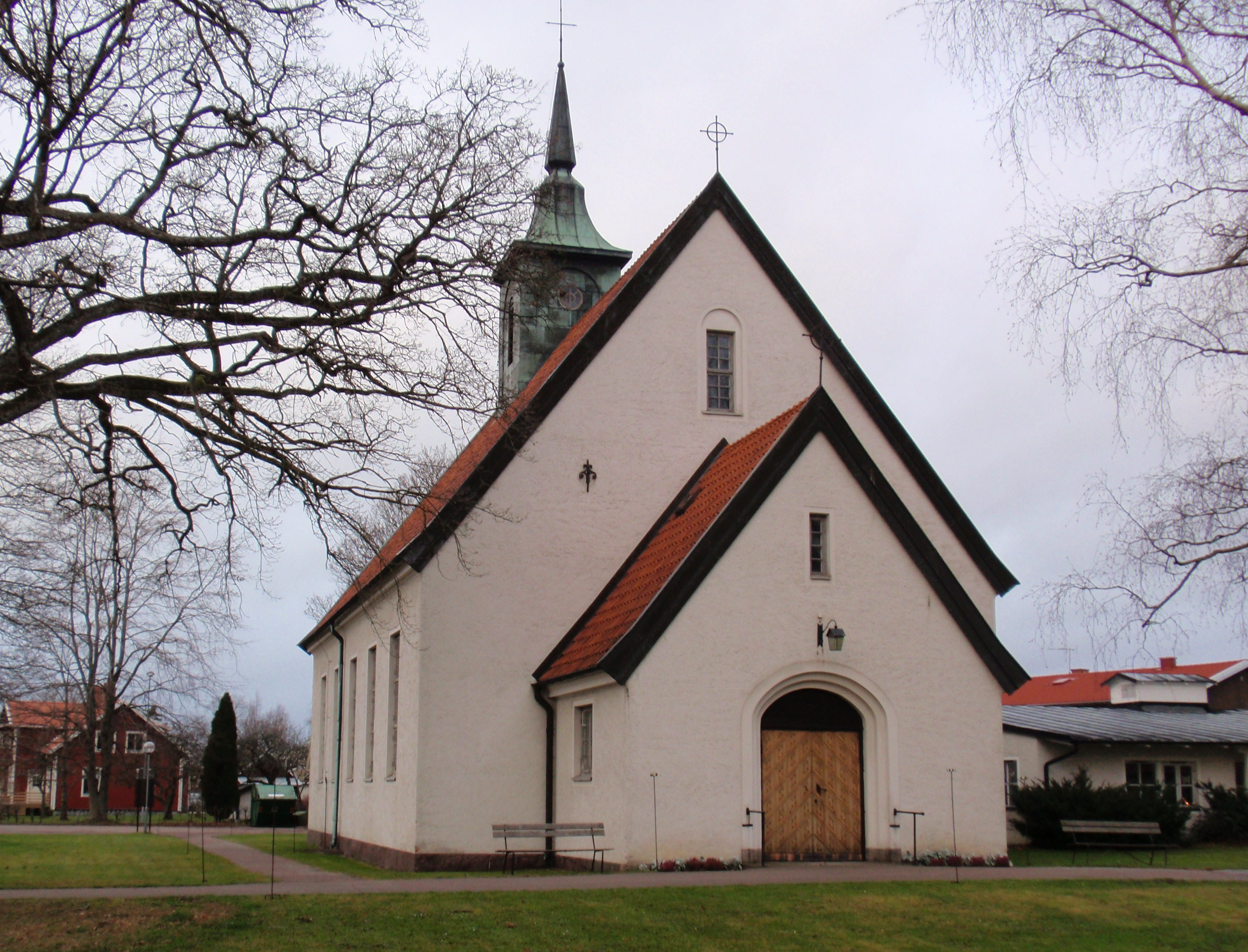

- Location within Kalmar Location within Sweden
- Coordinates: 56°42′N 16°07′E
- Country: Sweden
- Province: Småland
- County: Kalmar County
- Municipality: Kalmar Municipality

Area
  - Total: 1.94 km^{2} (0.75 sq mi)

Population (31 December 2010)
  - Total: 1,422
  - Density: 733/km^{2} (1,900/sq mi)
- Time zone: UTC+1 (CET)
  - Summer (DST): UTC+2 (CEST)

Trekanten is a locality situated in Kalmar Municipality, Kalmar County, Sweden with 1,422 inhabitants in 2010.
