= Tom Kuhn =

American dentist and yo-yo designer

Tom Kuhn (also known as Dr. Yo) is an American dentist and yo-yo designer based in San Francisco, California. Dissatisfied with the plastic yoyos of the 1970s, and nostalgic for the wooden yoyos of his youth, Kuhn developed the "No-Jive" yoyo, which is popular to the present.

Kuhn's own dental patients provided him support in his yo-yo career, with a lawyer patient advising him on a patent, and another advising he contact NASA regarding new space-age materials. Kuhn continued his dentistry while working in the yo-yo field, displaying his yo-yo collection in the lobby of the Victorian home used as his office.

In 1979, Kuhn set a Guinness World Record for the largest yo-yo, weighing 256 pounds.
