= Kalmartrissan =

Swedish yo-yo brand

Kalmartrissan is a brand of yo-yo which has been manufactured since 1932. The company that makes it, Elfverson & Co., is located in Påryd, about 30 kilometres (19 mi) from Kalmar in Småland, Sweden. In the early 1930s, Gösta Elfverson saw a yo-yo during a trip to England, and brought the idea with him to Sweden, where the manager of Elfverson's factory developed a unique construction: the Kalmartrissan is made in wood and in a single piece, rather than two pieces that have been glued together.

The toy is manufactured from beech wood, and bears a logo depicting the Castle of Kalmar, one of the best kept renaissance castles in Europe. "Trissa" is a Swedish word meaning pulley, which is sometimes used informally for other round objects, including yo-yos.

Between 150,000 and a million Kalmartrissan yo-yos are manufactured every year in Sweden.
