= Påryd =

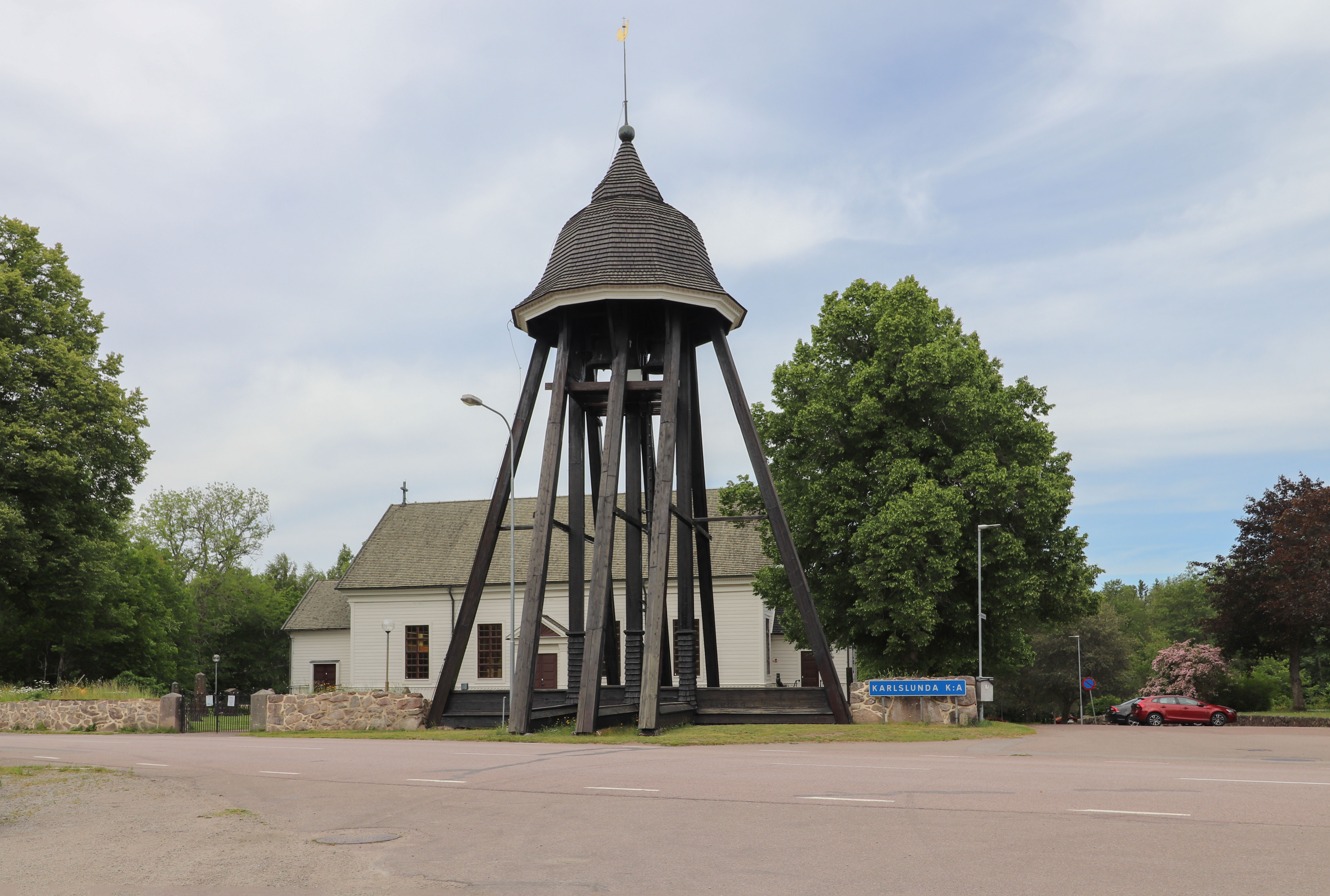

- Location within Kalmar Location within Sweden
- Coordinates: 56°34′N 15°55′E
- Country: Sweden
- Province: Småland
- County: Kalmar County
- Municipality: Kalmar Municipality

Area
  - Total: 1.15 km^{2} (0.44 sq mi)

Population (31 December 2010)
  - Total: 651
  - Density: 565/km^{2} (1,460/sq mi)
- Time zone: UTC+1 (CET)
  - Summer (DST): UTC+2 (CEST)

Påryd (Swedish pronunciation: [ˈpôːryːd]) is a locality within the Karlslunda district of Kalmar Municipality, Kalmar County, Sweden with 651 inhabitants in 2010. It lies 29 kilometres (18 mi) southwest of Kalmar. Påryd is home to the "Pårydsskolan" Elementary School and an outdoor heated public pool open during the season. Behind the outdoor pool are 3 hiking (cross country skiing) trails of varying distance that are marked and lit until 10pm. The head parish church for the Karlslunda parish is located here also.

Recently TeliaSonera has offered to the community to lay fiber optic cables for access to high speed internet services with 1000 mbs capable lines to each of the homes, which has been accepted by over 50% of the homeowners. Plans are underway to complete this by December 2015.

The woodworking company Elfverson & Co., which used to manufacture wooden bobbins (used in sewing machines and thread) and the Kalmartrissan yo-yo, is located in Påryd. Nowadays, they produce high quality wooden caps and tops for high end whiskey and tequila brands in the UK and USA.

== Karlslunda district ==
Besides Påryd, the district includes the localities of Billsäng, Bossmåla, Grötsjö, Harstensbo, Harstensbomåla, Hundshyltan, Hylkebo, Idehult, Kanagärde, Kättilhult, Mjödehult, Sävjö, Skärvsjö, Starbäck, Stenskallehult, Toragärde, Träkniv, Ugglebo, Vänsjö and Vörehult.
