= Pedro Flores (inventor) =

Filipino-American toymaker and businessman

- Born: April 26, 1896; Vintar, Ilocos Norte, Captaincy General of the Philippines
- Died: January 3, 1964 (aged 67); Coshocton, Ohio, U.S
- Education: University of California, Hastings College of the Law
- Occupation: Yo-yo maker

Pedro Edralin Flores (26 April 1896 – 3 January 1964) was a Filipino businessman and yo-yo maker who has been credited with popularizing yo-yos in the United States. He patented an innovation to yo-yos that used a loop instead of a knot around the axle, allowing for new tricks such as the ability to "sleep".

== Early history ==
Pedro Flores was born in Vintar, Ilocos Norte, Philippines and came to the United States in 1915. He attended the High School of Commerce in San Francisco from 1919 to 1920, and subsequently studied law at University of California, Berkeley and the Hastings College of Law in San Francisco. Flores dropped out of school and moved to Santa Barbara, California, where he worked at odd jobs to make a living.

While working as a bellboy, Flores read an article about a self-made millionaire who made his money by selling a ball attached to a rubber band. At this point he remembered the yo-yo (previously known as the bandalore), a game which has been played for hundreds of years in the Philippines. Bringing it all together, Flores saw a good market opportunity in the US, and the ability to go into business for himself.

== Flores yo-yos ==
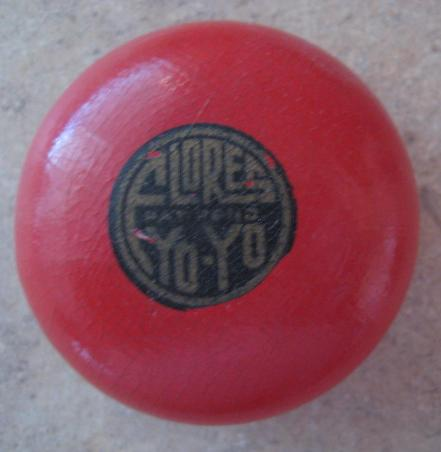
Flores Yo-yo c. 1928–1929

He founded a yo-yo manufacturing company in Santa Barbara, California, in 1928, founded the Flores Corporation in Hollywood and cofounded Flores and Stone in Los Angeles around 1929.

Flores initially made yo-yos for neighborhood children by hand, but soon started buying machinery to produce them more quickly. Approximately a year after Flores opened his yo-yo business, his company was selling 300,000 yo-yos annually. Flores has been credited with popularizing the yo-yo in the US, but he never claimed to have invented the yo-yo. Yo-yos were introduced to the Philippines in the 1800s. The word "yóyo" was a Tagalog word that means "come and go" or "come back" or "come-come". Flores is sometimes referred to as the original patent holder of the yo-yo. Although he didn't patent the first yo-yo in the US, his patent included the Filipino innovation of using a loop instead of a knot around the axle. This is known as an "unresponsive yo-yo" and allows for additional tricks such as the ability to "sleep". The ability to do tricks was one of the main selling points for Flores' yo-yos, and he created some of the first yo-yo trick competitions. Other types of yo-yos (Bandalores) had already been patented prior to the company's existence.

Between 1928 and 1932, Flores started and ran the Yo-yo Manufacturing Company in Santa Barbara before selling the initial rights to Duncan, who then also bought the trademark and continued to market and sell Flores yo-yos alongside the Duncan line. In the 1930s, Flores promoted yo-yo contests alongside Duncan. Later on, Flores cofounded the Chico yo-yo company in 1950 and founded the Flores Corporation of America in 1954.

== Duncan ==
Between 1930 and 1932, Flores sold his interest in his yo-yo manufacturing companies for more than $750,000, to Donald F. Duncan Sr., which during the depression of the 1930s was a fortune. On this transaction Flores was quoted saying "I am more interested in teaching children to use the yo-yos than I am in manufacturing of yo-yos."

He became one of the key promoters in Duncan's early yo-yo campaigns. During 1931-1932, Flores was instrumental in setting up a large number of the promotions in the cities where the early Duncan contests were being held. The new Duncan contests were vastly different from his contests from two years earlier. These contests required a series of tricks similar to modern day contests with ties being broken by the number of "loop the loops" completed.

== Sources ==
- Meisenheimer, Lucky J. (1999). Lucky's Collectors Guide to 20th Century Yo-Yos: History and Values. Orlando, Fl.: Lucky J's Swim & Surf, Inc.
- Hirahara, Naomi. (2003). Distinguished Asian American Business Leaders. Greenwood Publishing. pp. 56–58. ISBN 1-57356-344-7.
