= Hagby =

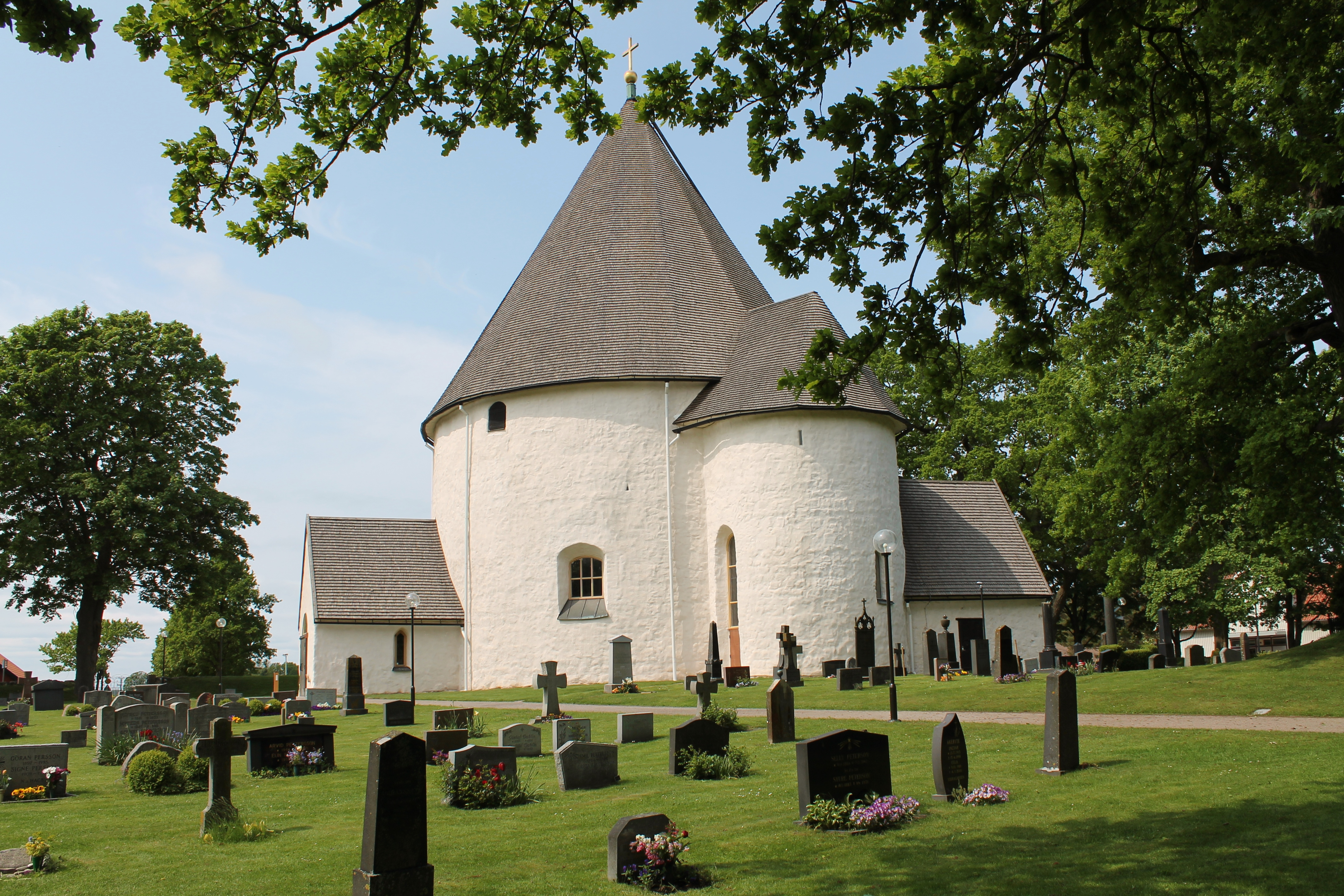
- Hagby Church

- Location within Kalmar Location within Sweden
- Coordinates: 56°33′37″N 16°10′55″E
- Country: Sweden
- Province: Småland
- County: Kalmar County
- Municipality: Kalmar Municipality

Area
  - Total: 1.94 km^{2} (0.75 sq mi)

Population (31 December 2010)
  - Total: 689
  - Density: 355/km^{2} (920/sq mi)
- Time zone: UTC+1 (CET)
  - Summer (DST): UTC+2 (CEST)

Hagby is a locality situated in Kalmar Municipality, Kalmar County, Sweden with 689 inhabitants in 2010. Hagby Church that lies in Hagby is one of only eight medieval round churches in Sweden.
