= Läckeby =

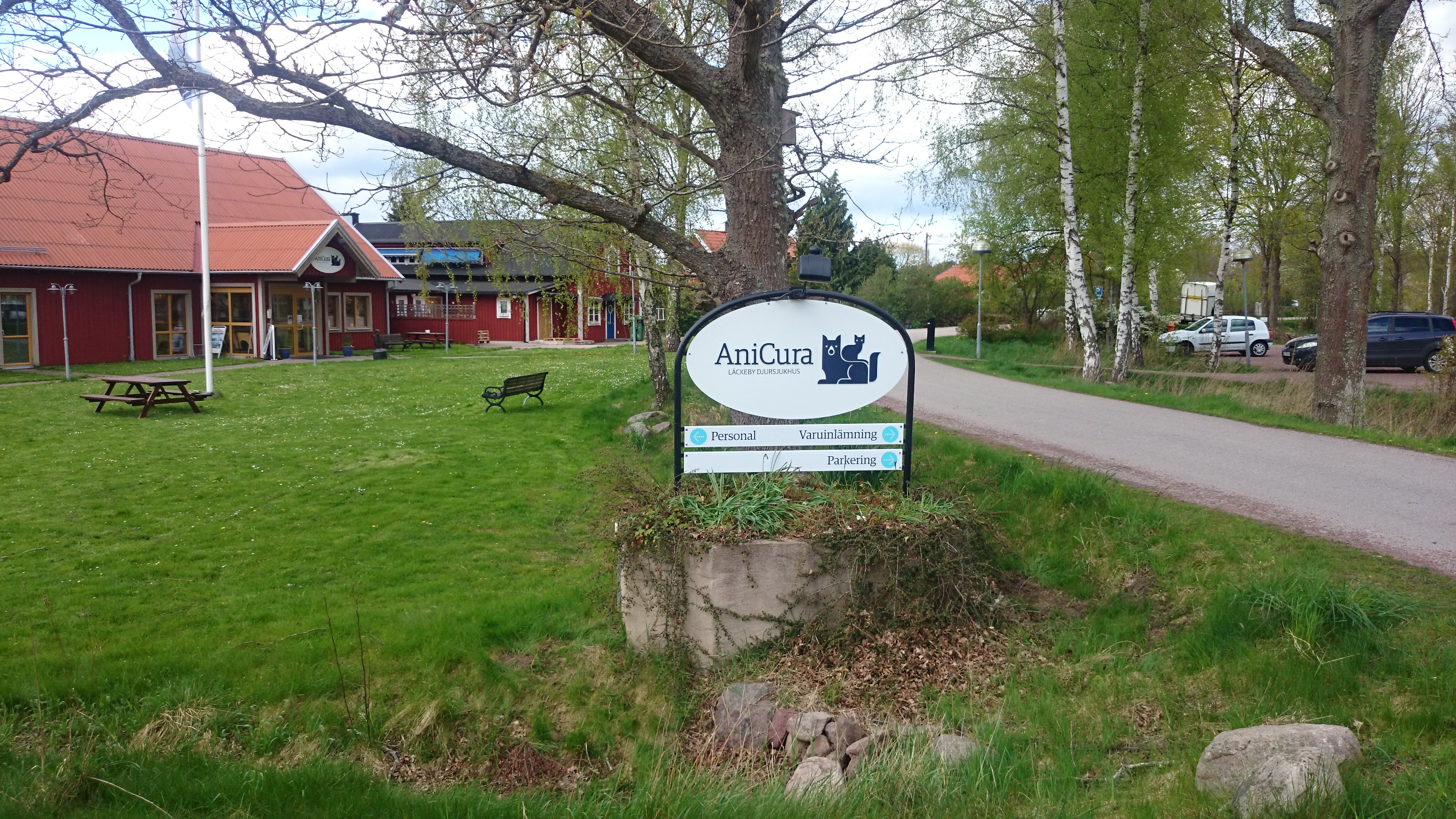

- Location within Kalmar Location within Sweden
- Coordinates: 56°47′00″N 16°17′41″E
- Country: Sweden
- Province: Småland
- County: Kalmar County
- Municipality: Kalmar Municipality

Area
  - Total: 1.02 km^{2} (0.39 sq mi)

Population (31 December 2010)
  - Total: 847
  - Density: 831/km^{2} (2,150/sq mi)
- Time zone: UTC+1 (CET)
  - Summer (DST): UTC+2 (CEST)

Läckeby is a locality situated in Kalmar Municipality, Kalmar County, Sweden with 847 inhabitants in 2010.
