= Lindsdal =

- Location within Kalmar Location within Sweden
- Coordinates: 56°44′N 16°18′E
- Country: Sweden
- Province: Småland
- County: Kalmar County
- Municipality: Kalmar Municipality

Area
  - Total: 3.59 km^{2} (1.39 sq mi)

Population (31 December 2010)
  - Total: 5,510
  - Density: 1,534/km^{2} (3,970/sq mi)
- Time zone: UTC+1 (CET)
  - Summer (DST): UTC+2 (CEST)

Lindsdal is a locality situated in Kalmar Municipality, Kalmar County, Sweden with 5,510 inhabitants in 2010.
