= Tvärskog =

- Location within Kalmar Location within Sweden
- Coordinates: 56°37′N 16°02′E
- Country: Sweden
- Province: Småland
- County: Kalmar County
- Municipality: Kalmar Municipality

Area
  - Total: 0.67 km^{2} (0.26 sq mi)

Population (31 December 2010)
  - Total: 404
  - Density: 607/km^{2} (1,570/sq mi)
- Time zone: UTC+1 (CET)
  - Summer (DST): UTC+2 (CEST)

Tvärskog (Swedish pronunciation: [tvæˈʂkuːɡ]) is a locality situated in Kalmar Municipality, Kalmar County, Sweden with 404 inhabitants in 2010.
