= Yo-yo =

Toy

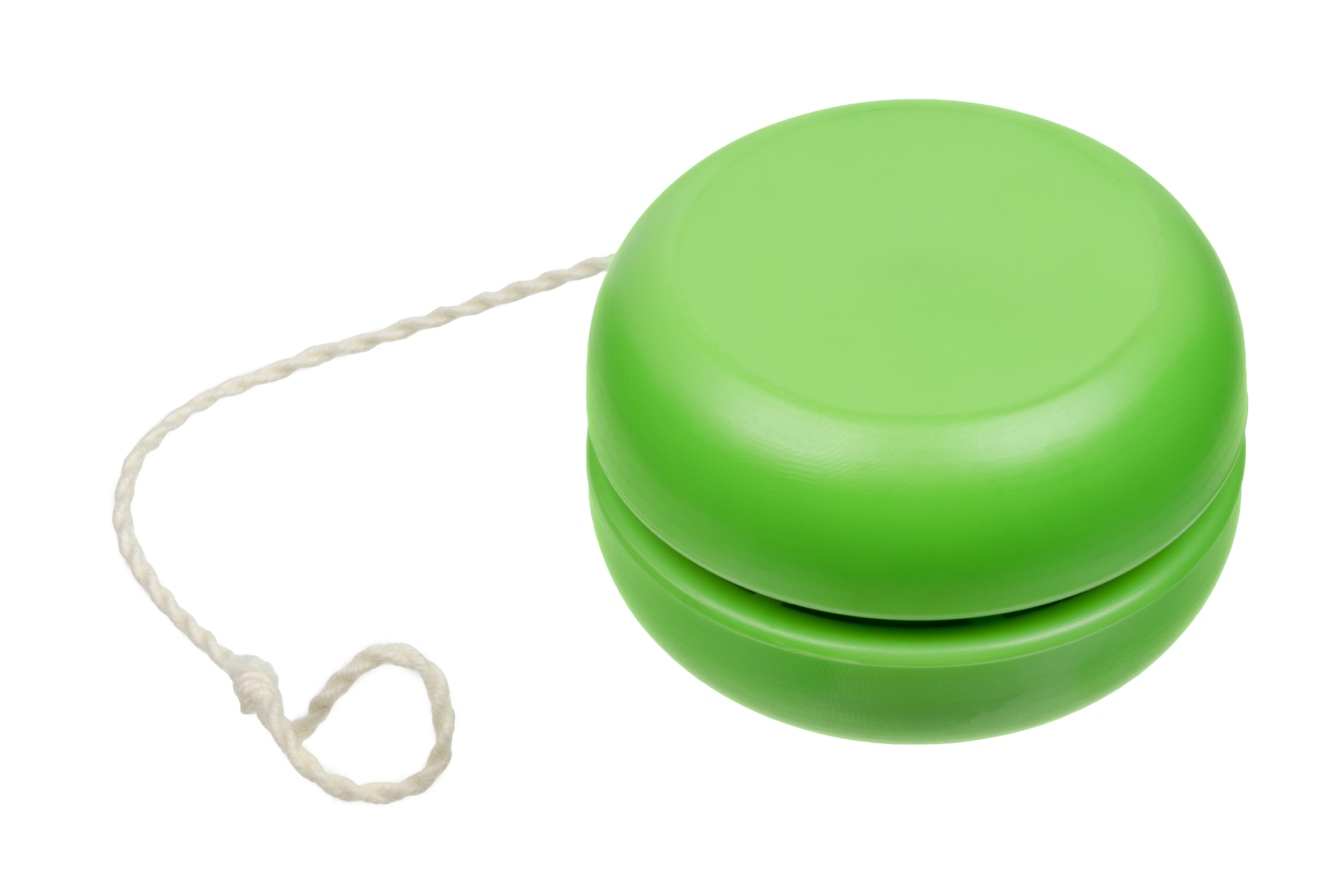
A plastic yo-yo

A yo-yo (also spelled yoyo) is a toy consisting of an axle connected to two disks, and a string is fastened around the axle, similar to a spool. It is an ancient toy documented since 440 BC. It was also called a bandalore in the 18th century.

It is played by holding the free end of the string known as the handle (by inserting one finger—usually the middle or ring finger—into a slip knot), allowing gravity (or the force of a throw and gravity) to spin the yo-yo and unwind the string (similar to how a pullstring works). The player then allows the yo-yo to wind itself back to the player's hand, exploiting its spin (and the associated rotational energy). This is often called "yo-yoing" or "playing yo-yo". The player can do various tricks such as looping, walking the dog, and the cartwheel.

In the simplest play, the string is intended to be wound on the spool by hand; the yo-yo is thrown downward, hits the end of the string then winds up the string toward the hand, and finally the yo-yo is grabbed, ready to be thrown again. One of the most basic tricks is called the sleeper, where the yo-yo spins at the end of the string for a noticeable amount of time before returning to the hand.

== Etymology and history ==
Yo-yos were known to the Ancient Greeks, and they appear in several Ancient Greek vase paintings, though the Ancient Greek word for them is unknown. Surviving examples from the period exist made of bronze and terracotta (fired clay), though the most common material was likely wood.

A Mughal painting from around 1770 shows the use of a string toy that is similar, but not identical, to the modern yo-yo.

Yo-yos were popular in England around the end of the eighteenth century, where they were commonly called bandalores or bandylores.

The word yo-yo probably comes from the Ilocano term yóyo, or a cognate word from the Philippines.

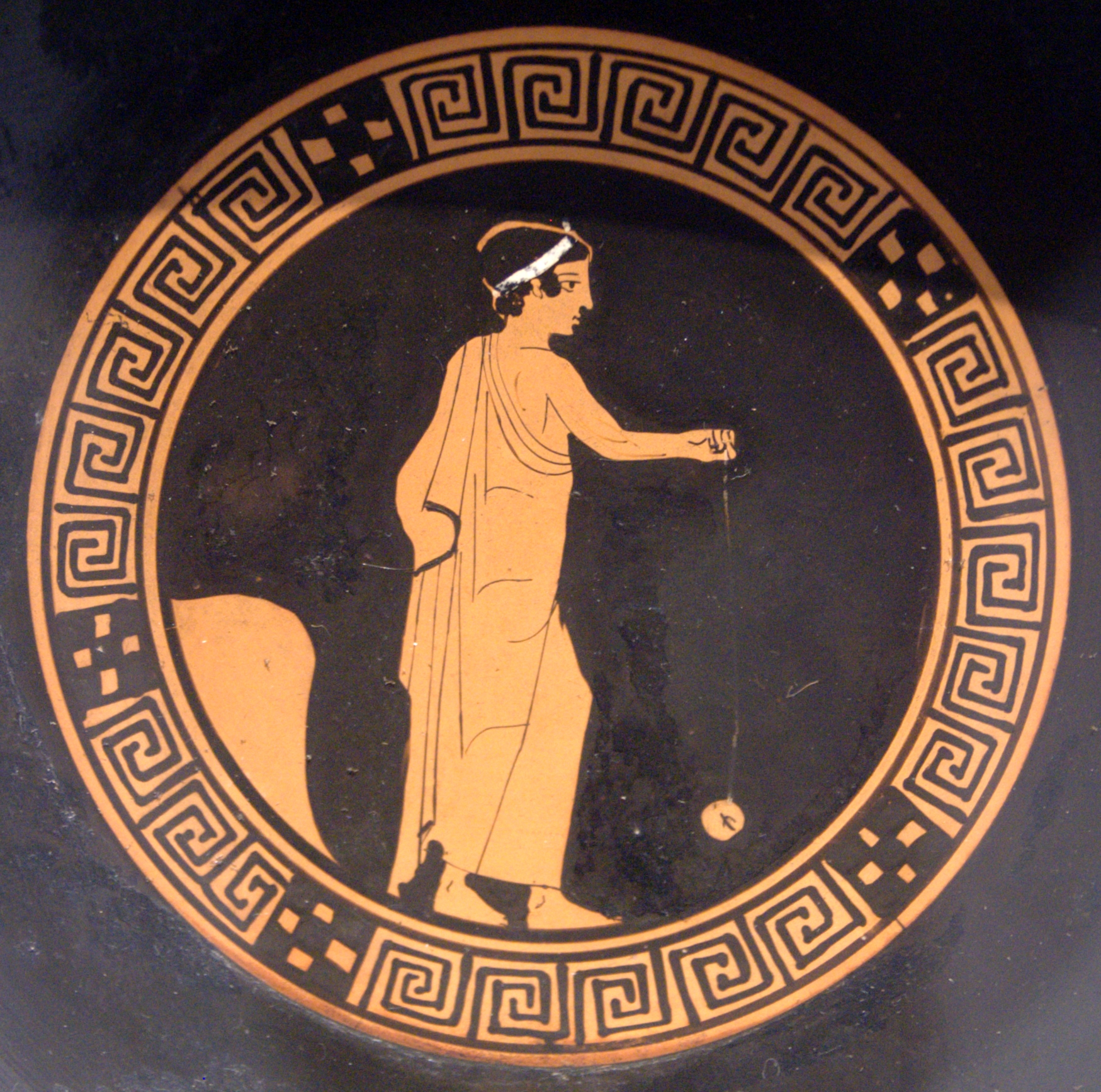
Boy playing with a yo-yo, Attic kylix, c. 440 BC, Antikensammlung Berlin (F 2549)

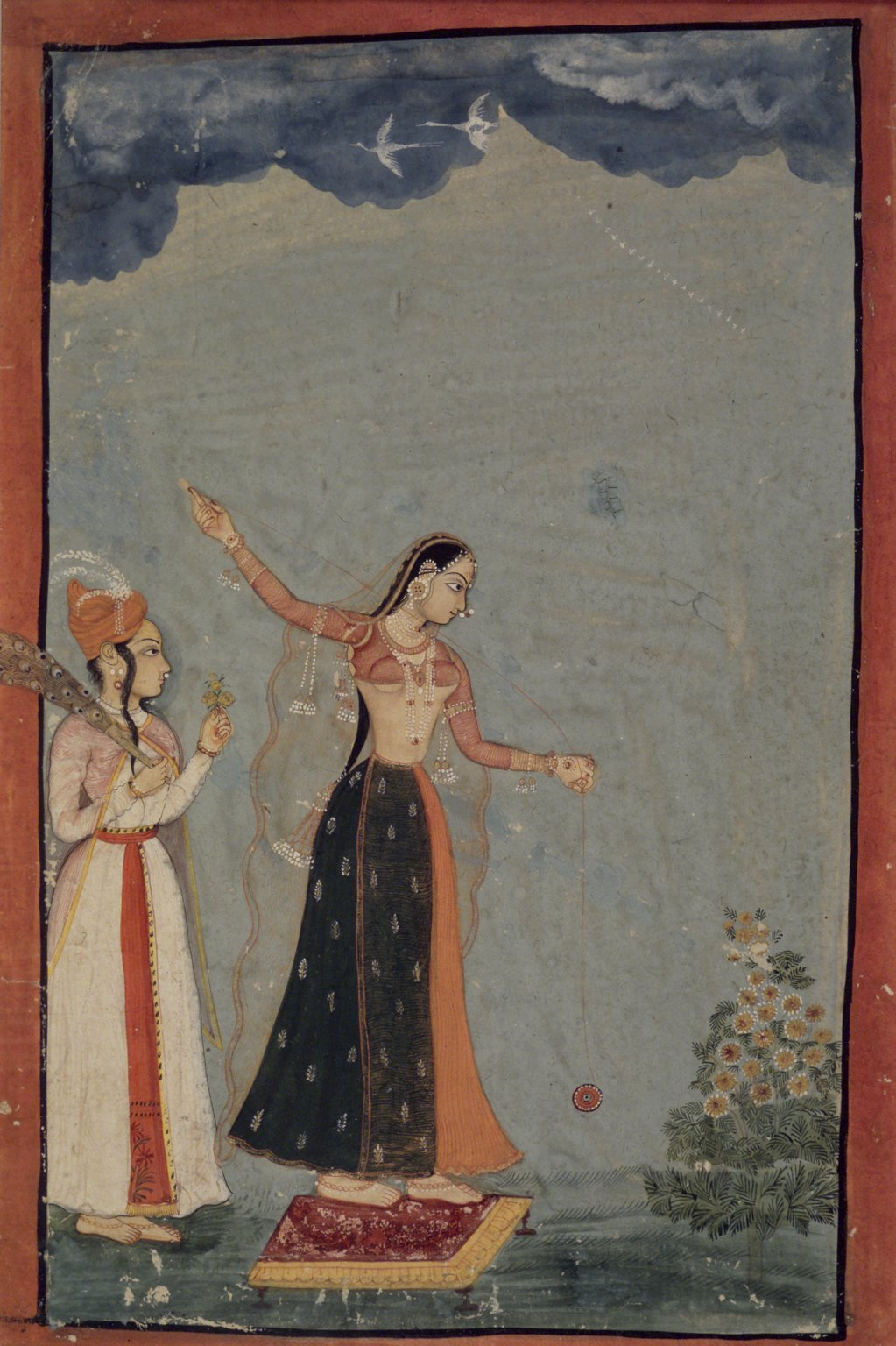
Lady with a yo-yo, Northern India (Rajasthan, Bundi or Kota), c. 1770 Opaque watercolor and gold on paper

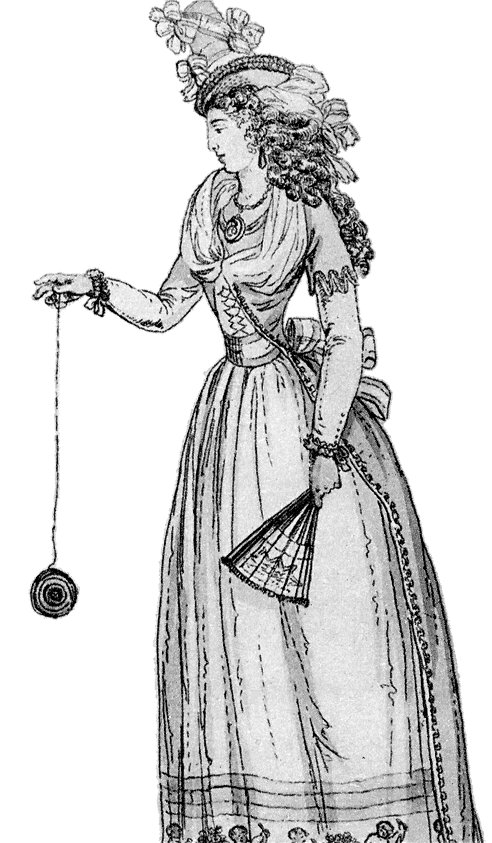
A 1791 illustration of a woman playing with an early version of the yo-yo, which was then called a "bandalore"

=== First yo-yo company ===
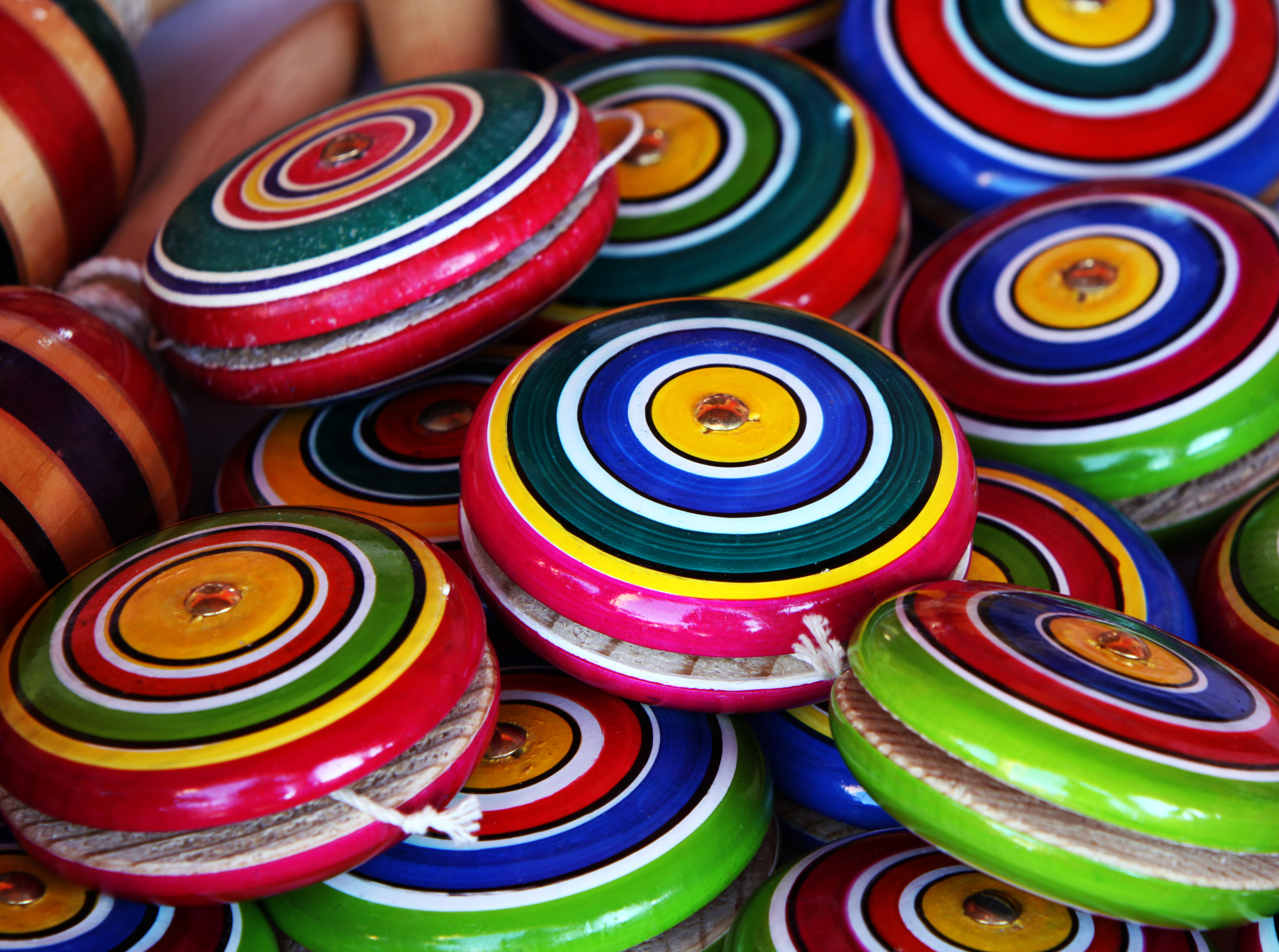
After the yo-yo was introduced to the United States, it spread to Mexico—a pile of handmade wood Mexican yo-yos is pictured.

In 1928, Pedro Flores, a Filipino immigrant to the United States, opened the Yo-yo Manufacturing Company in Santa Barbara, California. The business started with a dozen handmade toys; by November 1929, Flores was operating two additional factories in Los Angeles and Hollywood, which all together employed 600 workers and produced 300,000 units daily.

The principal distinction between the Filipino design popularized by Flores and the more traditional yo-yos is in the way the yo-yo is strung. In older (and some remaining inexpensive) yo-yo designs, the string is tied to the axle using a knot. With this technique, the yo-yo just goes back and forth; it returns easily, but it is impossible to make it sleep. In Flores's design, one continuous piece of string, double the desired length, is twisted around something to produce a loop at one end which is fitted around the axle. Also termed a looped slip-string, this seemingly minor modification allows for a far greater variety and sophistication of motion, thanks to increased stability and suspension of movement during free spin.

Shortly thereafter (c. 1929), entrepreneur Donald F. Duncan recognized the potential of this new fad and purchased the Flores Yo-yo Corporation and all its assets, including the Flores name, which was transferred to the new company in 1932.

The name "Yo-yo" was registered in 1932 as a trademark by Sam Dubiner in Vancouver, Canada, and remains a trademark in that country. Harvey Lowe won the first World Yo-Yo Contest in London, England. In 1932, Swedish Kalmartrissan yo-yos started to be manufactured as well.

In 1933, yo-yos were banned in Syria, because many locals superstitiously blamed the use of them for a severe drought.

In 1946, the Duncan Toys Company opened a yo-yo factory in Luck, Wisconsin. The Duncan yo-yo was inducted into the National Toy Hall of Fame at The Strong in Rochester, New York, in 1999.

=== 1960s resurgence ===
Declining sales after World War II prompted Duncan to launch a comeback campaign for his trademarked "Yo-Yo" in 1962 with a series of television advertisements.

In a trademark case in 1965, a federal court of appeal ruled in favor of the Royal Tops Company, determining that yo-yo had become a part of common speech and that Duncan no longer had exclusive rights to the term. As a result of the expenses incurred by this legal battle as well as other financial pressures, the Duncan family sold the company name and associated trademarks in 1968 to Flambeau, Inc, which had manufactured Duncan's plastic models since 1955. As of 2020, Flambeau Plastics continued to run the company.

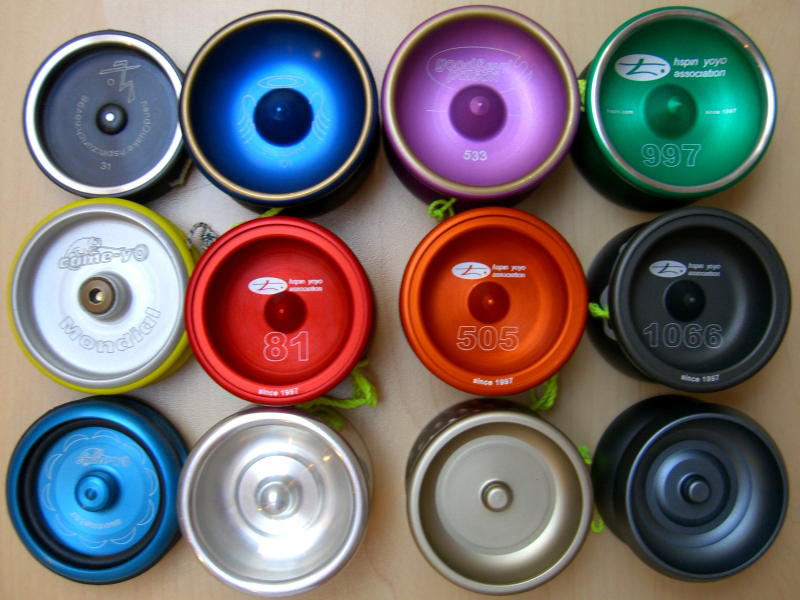
Modern yo-yos, some made of both aluminium and stainless steel

=== Rise of the ball bearing ===
As popularity spread through the 1970s and 1980s, there were a number of innovations in yo-yo technology, primarily regarding the connection between the string and the axle. In 1979, dentist and yo-yo celebrity Tom Kuhn patented the "No Jive 3-in-1" yo-yo, creating the world's first "take-apart" yo-yo, which enabled yo-yo players to change the axle.

Swedish bearing company SKF briefly manufactured novelty yo-yos with ball bearings in 1984. In 1990, Kuhn introduced the SB-2 yo-yo that had an aluminum transaxle, making it the first successful ball-bearing yo-yo. The SB2 was originally offered only in a natural silver color, but as time went on, it became available in many different colors, with various decorative embellishments.

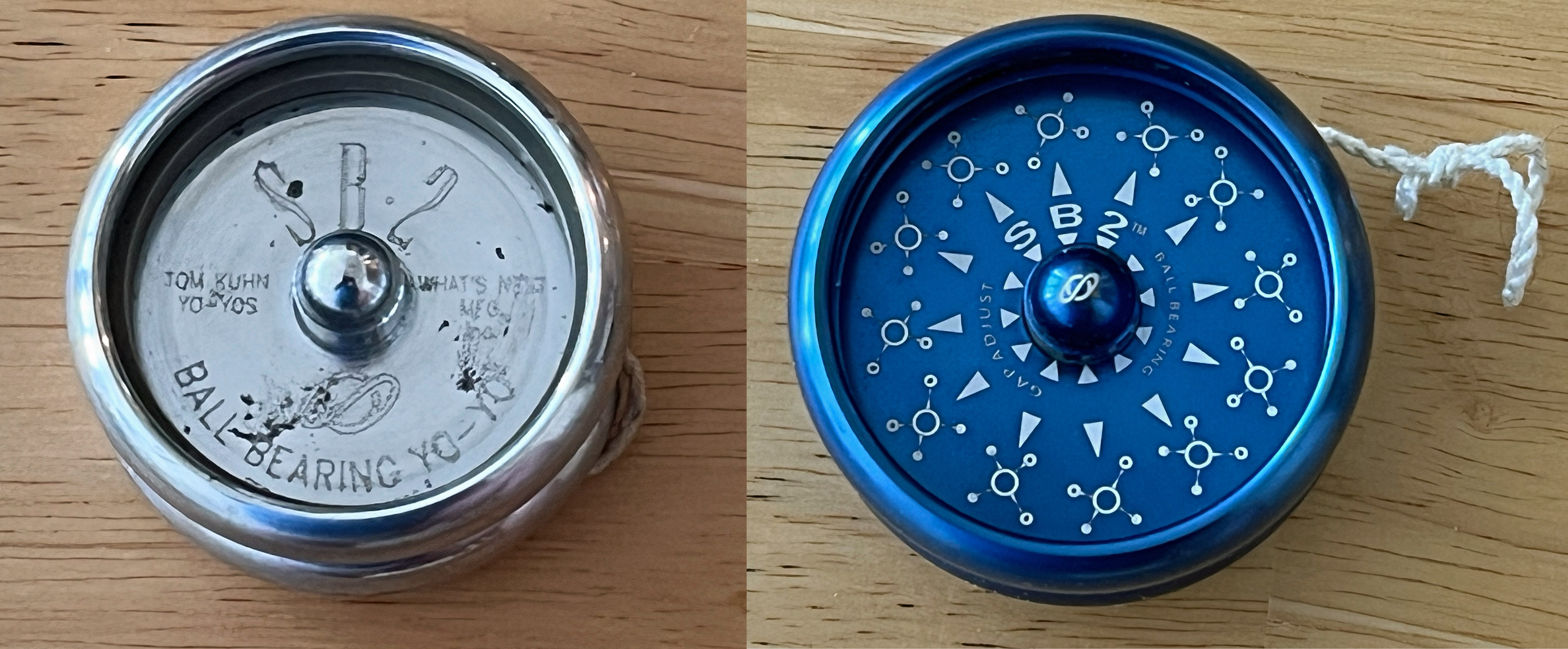
Tom Kuhn SB2 ball-bearing yoyos: left, original model from the early 1990s; right, a modern colored offering

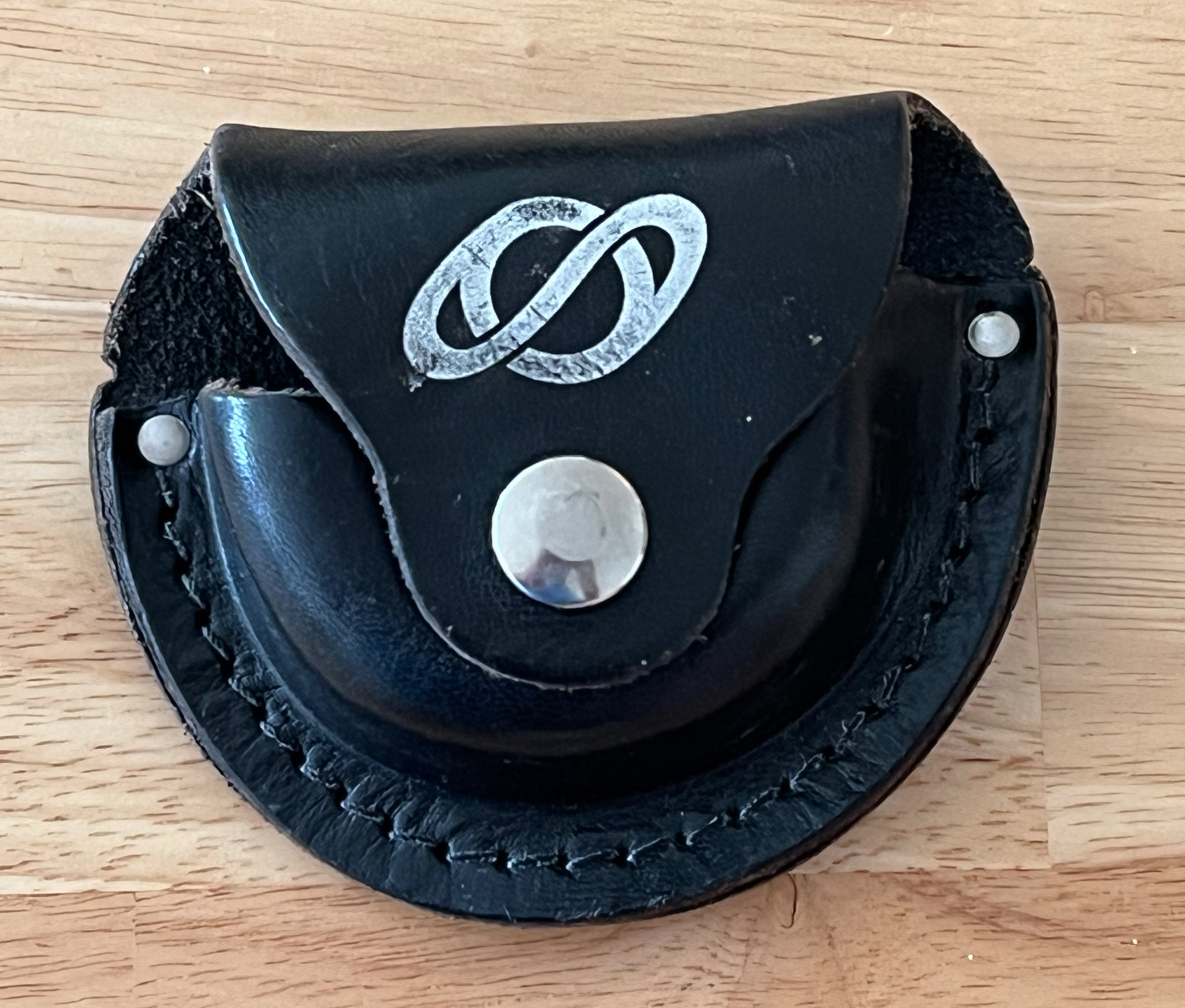
Tom Kuhn leather case for SB2 yoyo, 1990s

In all transaxle yo-yos, ball bearings significantly reduce friction when the yo-yo is spinning, enabling longer and more complex tricks. Subsequent yo-yo players used this ability to their advantage, creating new tricks that had not been possible with fixed-axle designs.

There are many new types of ball bearings in the market which deviate from the original design and/or material of the standard stainless steel ball bearing. For example, a certain type of bearing has an inward facing curved surface, to prevent the string from rubbing on the sides of the yo-yo, which would cause unwanted friction when performing intricate string tricks. Other manufacturers replicate this with a similar inwardly curved surface, but use minor modifications. Some high-end bearings use ceramic composites in the balls of the bearing, to reduce internal friction, again making for a smoother spinning yo-yo. Precious materials such as ruby have also been used as a material in prototype ball bearings for its properties such as extreme hardness. The material was first tested in a prototype bearing made by Wolf Yoyo Works in May 2018.

=== Modern yo-yo ===
The era following the yo-yo boom of the late 1990s is often referred to as the "modern" era of yo-yo. The modern era of yo-yo is characterized by markedly more complicated and sophisticated yo-yo techniques than came before in addition to a plethora of different yo-yo designs created to serve various niche purposes. This increased complexity of yo-yo play was allowed by the introduction of the ball-bearing technology to yo-yos, which enabled yo-yos to spin much longer than was previously possible. This, in addition to the advent of the bind technique and unresponsive yo-yoing equipped yo-yo players with an essentially limitless amount of freedom, with which they were able to create myriad yo-yo tricks and techniques.

In the wake of this revolution that took place in yo-yo, a landscape of yo-yo competitions tailored towards this modern style of yo-yo play emerged. One example of such competitions is the World Yo-Yo Contest. Outside of the competition scene, yo-yo players regularly share videos of their yo-yo tricks on the Internet; a common place players do so is on Instagram, using the hashtag "#trickcircle". Some yo-yo players have also found modest success outside the yo-yo community, going viral on TikTok, gaining significant YouTube followings, or being featured guests on television programs.

In 2026, the reign of unresponsive yo-yos has shifted the landscape of competitive play as well as the responsive yoyos. Responsive yo-yos are still used as seen at The Modern Responsive Freestyle Division Presented by OneDrop - PNWR 2026"

== Techniques ==
=== Sleeping ===
The sleeper is one of the most common yo-yo throws and is the basis for nearly all yo-yo throws other than looping, the basic yo-yo skill taught to children and beginners. Keeping a yo-yo spinning while remaining at the end of its uncoiled string is known as sleeping. While the yo-yo is in the "sleeping" state at the end of the string, one can then execute tricks like "walk the dog", "the elevator", "around the world", or the slightly more complex "rock the baby".

The essence of the throw is that one throws the yo-yo with a very pronounced wrist action so that when the yo-yo reaches the end of the string it spins in place rather than rolling back up the string to the thrower's hand. Most modern yo-yos have a transaxle or ball bearing to assist this, but if it is a fixed axle yo-yo, the tension must be loose enough to allow this. The two main ways to do this are (1) allow the yo-yo to sit at the bottom of the string to unwind, or (2) perform lariat or UFO to loosen the tension. When one decides to end the "sleeping" state, one merely jerks the wrist and the yo-yo "catches" the string and rolls back up to the hand. Ball-bearing yo-yos with a "butterfly" shape, primarily used for string tricks, frequently have a low response or are completely unresponsive, requiring a "bind" for the yo-yo to return.

In competition, mastery of sleeping is the basis for the 1A division. Inexpensive fixed-axle yo-yos usually spin between 10 and 20 seconds, while the expensive ball bearing yo-yos can spin about 1–4 minutes depending on the throw. As of 2010, the world record sleep times were 3:51.54 minutes for fixed-axle and 21:15.17 minutes for transaxle yo-yos. In 2012, the transaxle yo-yo sleep time record was broken by the C3YoyoDesign BTH, with a time of 30:28.30 minutes. A traditional sleeper throw is employed to start frontstyle combinations, whereas a sideways sleeper, or "breakaway" is used to start sidestyle combinations.

=== Mounts, transitions, and dismounts ===
Yo-yo tricks in which the yo-yo comes to be sitting on a string are called mounts. Transitions are employed to move from one mount to another. Frontstyle mounts include the under and over mounts, as well as the split bottom mount. Sidestyle mounts include the man on the flying trapeze. Combinations can be produced by transitioning from one mount to another in various ways.

Combinations which can repeat indefinitely are called "repeaters" or "flow tricks".

=== Loops and regens ===
Loops are yoyo tricks that consist of the yoyo looping around the throw hand.

A certain class of looping tricks, regens, are tricks that add spin to a yoyo without having to return it to the throwing hand. Because regens switch between frontstyle and sidestyle, they are frequently used to transition between frontstyle and sidestyle combinations.

=== Tricks which adjust string tension ===
Certain tricks, such as the UFO and Sidewinder, can alter the string tension, making it looser or tighter, thereby altering the response of the yo-yo. This also allows for a certain type of trick called slack tricks to be completed with greater ease.

=== Yo-yo notation ===
Several methods of notating yo-yo tricks have been formulated, including a system described by Mark Mcbride in his work about yo-yo theory, the Yonomicon. This system is similar to Ross Levine's "Modern Yoyo Notation". Modern yo-yo notation is designed to be ambidextrous, further eschewing terms like "clockwise" and "counterclockwise".

== Styles ==
=== Unresponsive (1A) ===
Eventually, wider string gaps and silicone response systems led to the innovation of unresponsive yoyoing, otherwise known as 1A. Traditional yoyos (responsive) would return to the hand when one would tug on the string, but unresponsive yoyos behave a little differently. Instead of returning to the hand when one tugs on the string, one has to perform a trick called a "bind" where the string is doubled over inside the string gap to increase friction on the response system. This has brought about innovation of many different kinds of tricks involving leaving slack in the string, as this would have caused a responsive yoyo to return to the hand. This style of yoyoing is the most popular and the most common, and the most yoyo tricks are done with 1A yoyos.

=== Looping (2A) ===
Looping is a yo-yo technique which emphasizes keeping the body of two yo-yos, one on each hand, in constant motion, with or without sleeping.

Yo-yos optimized for looping have weight concentrated in their centers so they may easily rotate about the string's axis without their mass contributing to resistance due to a gyroscopic effect.

In yo-yo competitions, looping both to the inside and outside of the hand with the yo-yo plays a strong role in the 2A division. Sometimes the yoyos would wrap around arms, legs, or necks.

Also known as two hands looping freestyle.

=== Two-handed string tricks (3A) ===
Two-handed or 3A style play involves doing string tricks with two flared bearing yo-yos. Popularized and pioneered by Mark McBride, the first modern Triple A trick appeared in Fiend Magazine and was called the Velvet Rolls. The different mounts in this style are referred to as houses (e.g. "Kink House").

Photos from as early as the late 1950s show early yo-yo demonstrators performing very basic 3A tricks, such as a sleeper with one hand, and a trapeze with the other. While 3A as a concept has existed for many years, it was not until the debut of velvet rolls, coupled with the rise of unresponsive yoyo play, that development began on what is currently considered Triple A. This is one of the most complex styles, and is the most likely to obtain knots in the string, along with dings and scuffs against the yoyos.

In competition, two handed string tricks are referred to under the 3A division.

=== Off-string (4A) ===
In the "off-string" technique, the yo-yo's string is not tied directly to the axle, and the yo-yo is usually launched into the air by performing a "forward pass" to be caught again on the string. However, some players can 'throw down' off-string yo-yos and catch it on the string just as it leaves the end of the string by pivoting the string around a finger as it unwinds, so that the yo-yo is caught on the string. This is exactly the opposite of a "forward pass", but with the same result.

Yo-yos optimized for off-string tricks have flared designs, like the butterfly shape, which makes it easier to land on the string, and until recently, rubber rims on the edges, so minimum damage is inflicted on the yo-yo, the player, or anyone who happens to be standing nearby, should a trick go wrong. There are also tricks which involve the use of two off-string yoyos at the same time, thrown with the same hand, this is known as "soloham". Most offstring yoyos in the modern day are made from polycarbonate, POM, and delrin plastics, sometimes with inner metal weight rings to improve spin time and stability.

Yo-yo competitions have the 4A division for off-string tricks.

=== Freehand (5A) ===
In freehand tricks, the yo-yo's string is not tied to the player's hand, instead ending in a counterweight. The counterweight is then thrown from hand to hand, bouncing off of the body, wrapping around the yo-yo's axle and swung around, used as an additional element in the trick.

Developed in 1999 by Steve Brown, as of 2008 freehand is considered to be the fastest-growing style of yo-yo play. Steve Brown was awarded a patent on his freehand yo-yo system, which was assigned to Flambeau Products (Duncan's parent company). Duncan patented the counterweight, and no one was able to sell their own counterweight designs. However, since March 28, 2020, the patent has expired.

In yo-yo competitions, counterweight yo-yos are emphasized in the 5A division.

=== Modern responsive (0A) ===
Modern responsive yo-yo can be thought of as 2A with a single yoyo, but differs from 2A in the fact that it, like 1A, has access to tricks involving the use of the free hand. Unlike 1A, modern responsive deliberately abstains from tricks that involve sleeping, frequently replacing mounts with stalls, and tossing the yoyo in the air whilst in these mounts, sometimes referring these tricks as skateboarding tricks; ex kick flip.

== Physical mechanism ==
When the yo-yo is first released, the gravity (and the throw) give it translational kinetic energy and necessarily, since the string must unwind, much of this energy is converted into rotational kinetic energy establishing the free movement of the yo-yo, and causing it to spin rapidly. As the yo-yo unwinds downward, it also converts potential energy from gravity to translational energy in its rotation to overcome gravity all the way back up to the hand.

Because the sense of spinning does not change during the whole move, the string winds up in the opposite direction upon the return of the yo-yo. If the shaft of the yo-yo is connected to the string with a loop, there may not be enough frictional force to overcome the weight of the yo-yo, which is necessary to begin winding up the string. In this case, the yo-yo will continue to spin in the loop at the end of the string (or sleep), just being slightly braked by the small dynamic friction, instead of returning. However, if the string is jerked slightly up, or the hand is lowered, the slack created in the string will allow it to begin winding around the shaft, thereby increasing friction and allowing it to catch as the static friction force rises above the gravitation force holding the yo-yo at the bottom of the string, making the yo-yo wind up the string returning to the hand.

Patents have been issued to create more complicated mechanisms to allow tension control and an adjustable mechanism.

== Purported use as weapons ==
There is no sound historical evidence that yo-yos were ever used as weapons; the notion is believed to have been a marketing gimmick disseminated by Duncan yo-yo demonstrators in the early years of the company.

Regardless, the notion that yo-yos can be used as weapons persists to this day in pop culture, as in the Chinese television series Blazing Teens, in the French franchise Miraculous by the character Ladybug and in the Super Smash Bros. video game series by the character Ness. Other characters depicted wielding yo-yos as weapons include Bridget, Kirby, and Pipistrello. The video games EarthBound and Terraria feature many yo-yo weapons. The yo-yo weapon depicted in the 1983 James Bond film Octopussy, in which the disks are large circular saw blades, has been described as "wholly improbable, impractical, and probably suicidal".

== See also ==
- Chinese yo-yo
- Clackers
- Eskimo yo-yo
- Kendama
- Spinning top
- Yo-yo balloon
