= Duncan Toys Company =

American toy company

Duncan Toys
- Industry: Retail
- Founded: November 15, 1929; 96 years ago
- Headquarters: Middlefield, Ohio
- Products: Toys
- Parent: The Nordic Group of Companies
- Website: duncantoys.com

Duncan Toys Company is an American toy manufacturer based in Middlefield, Ohio. The company was founded in 1929 by Donald F. Duncan Sr. and purchased the Flores Yo-Yo Company from Pedro Flores, who brought the yo-yo to the United States from the Philippines.

Duncan popularized the yo-yo through competitions; it was promoted in publications by William Randolph Hearst in exchange for a requirement that contestants had to sell subscriptions to Hearst newspapers as a condition of entry. In 1965, a federal court ruled that Duncan did not have exclusive rights to the word "yo-yo" because the word had become a part of common speech.

In 1968, Duncan Toys became a division of Flambeau. In October of 2024, Duncan Toys spun out of Flambeau to become an entirely separate and independent corporate entity.

In 1999, the Duncan yo-yo was inducted into the Strong National Museum of Play's National Toy Hall of Fame.

In 2017, the makers of Rubik's Cube sued Duncan Toys Company over their "Quick Cube", alleging that the toy "mimics the features and overall appearance" of the Rubik's Cube puzzle.
