= Smedby =

- Location within Kalmar Location within Sweden
- Coordinates: 56°40′45″N 16°14′08″E
- Country: Sweden
- Province: Småland
- County: Kalmar County
- Municipality: Kalmar Municipality

Area
  - Total: 2.06 km^{2} (0.80 sq mi)

Population (31 December 2010)
  - Total: 3,487
  - Density: 1,693/km^{2} (4,380/sq mi)
- Time zone: UTC+1 (CET)
  - Summer (DST): UTC+2 (CEST)

Smedby is a locality situated in Kalmar Municipality, Kalmar County, Sweden with 3,487 inhabitants in 2010.
