= Bengt Berg (ornithologist) =

Swedish photographer, scientist and writer (1885–1967)

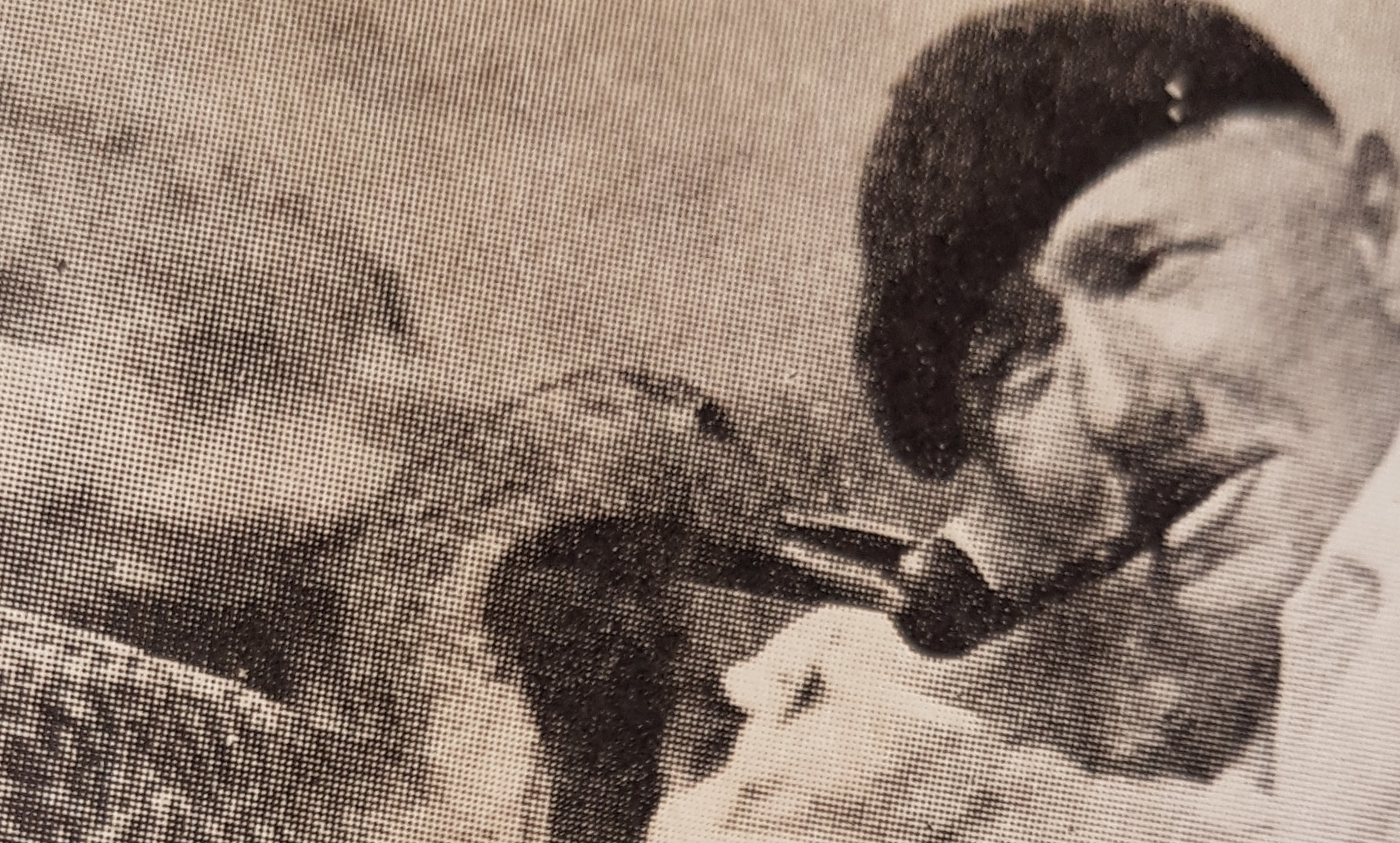
- Born: 9 January 1885; Kalmar, Småland, Sweden
- Died: 31 July 1967 (aged 82); Halltorp, Kalmar, Sweden

Bengt Magnus Kristoffer Berg (9 January 1885 – 31 July 1967) was a Swedish ornithologist, zoologist, wildlife photographer, and writer. He is best remembered for photos and movies of birds, taken on several expeditions. His avifauna photography is highly celebrated.

== Selected works (in German) ==
- Abu Markub. Mit der Filmkamera unter Elefanten und Riesenstörchen. Reimer, Berlin 1940
- Arizona Charleys Junge. Verlag Putty, Wuppertal 1954
- Der Lämmergeier im Himalaja. Antigone-Verlag, Allendorf/Eder 2006, ISBN 3-929987-36-8
- Die letzten Adler. Reimer, Berlin 1943
- Die Liebesgeschichte einer Wildgans. Reimer, Berlin 1949
- Mein Freund, der Regenpfeifer. Antigone-Verlag, Allendorf/Eder 2003, ISBN 3-921755-78-6
- Meine Jagd nach dem Einhorn. Rütten & Loening, Frankfurt/M. 1933
- Mit den Zugvögeln nach Afrika. Antigone-Verlag, Allendorf/Eder 2001, ISBN 3-929987-28-7
- Tiger und Mensch. Limpert-Verlag, Frankfurt/M. 1958
