= Drag, Sweden =

Drag
- Location within Kalmar Location within Sweden
- Coordinates: 56°46′30″N 16°24′20″E
- Country: Sweden
- Province: Småland
- County: Kalmar County
- Municipality: Kalmar Municipality

Area
  - Total: 0.62 km^{2} (0.24 sq mi)

Population (31 December 2010)
  - Total: 274
  - Density: 440/km^{2} (1,100/sq mi)
- Time zone: UTC+1 (CET)
  - Summer (DST): UTC+2 (CEST)

Drag (or Söregärde och Drag) is a locality situated in Kalmar Municipality, Kalmar County, Sweden with 274 inhabitants in 2010.
