= Rinkabyholm =

- Location within Kalmar Location within Sweden
- Coordinates: 56°39′N 16°16′E
- Country: Sweden
- Province: Småland
- County: Kalmar County
- Municipality: Kalmar Municipality

Area
  - Total: 1.21 km^{2} (0.47 sq mi)

Population (31 December 2010)
  - Total: 1,607
  - Density: 1,332/km^{2} (3,450/sq mi)
- Time zone: UTC+1 (CET)
  - Summer (DST): UTC+2 (CEST)

Rinkabyholm is a locality situated in Kalmar Municipality, Kalmar County, Sweden with 1,607 inhabitants in 2010.
