= Vassmolösa =

- Location within Kalmar Location within Sweden
- Coordinates: 56°36′N 16°10′E
- Country: Sweden
- Province: Småland
- County: Kalmar County
- Municipality: Kalmar Municipality

Area
  - Total: 1.36 km^{2} (0.53 sq mi)

Population (31 December 2010)
  - Total: 535
  - Density: 392/km^{2} (1,020/sq mi)
- Time zone: UTC+1 (CET)
  - Summer (DST): UTC+2 (CEST)

Vassmolösa is a locality situated in Kalmar Municipality, Kalmar County, Sweden with 535 inhabitants in 2010. It has a Thing, inn, railway station, sawmill and cement foundry.

Historical population
Year	Pop.	±%
1960	470	—
1965	526	+11.9%
1970	524	−0.4%
1975	536	+2.3%
1980	523	−2.4%
1990	538	+2.9%
1995	553	+2.8%
2000	552	−0.2%
2005	544	−1.4%
2010	535	−1.7%
2015	524	−2.1%
