= Dunö =

- Location within Kalmar Location within Sweden
- Coordinates: 56°38′N 16°16′E
- Country: Sweden
- Province: Småland
- County: Kalmar County
- Municipality: Kalmar Municipality

Area
  - Total: 0.50 km^{2} (0.19 sq mi)

Population (31 December 2010)
  - Total: 384
  - Density: 763/km^{2} (1,980/sq mi)
- Time zone: UTC+1 (CET)
  - Summer (DST): UTC+2 (CEST)

Dunö is a locality situated in Kalmar Municipality, Kalmar County, Sweden with 384 inhabitants as of 2010.
