= Halltorp, Kalmar =

Halltorp
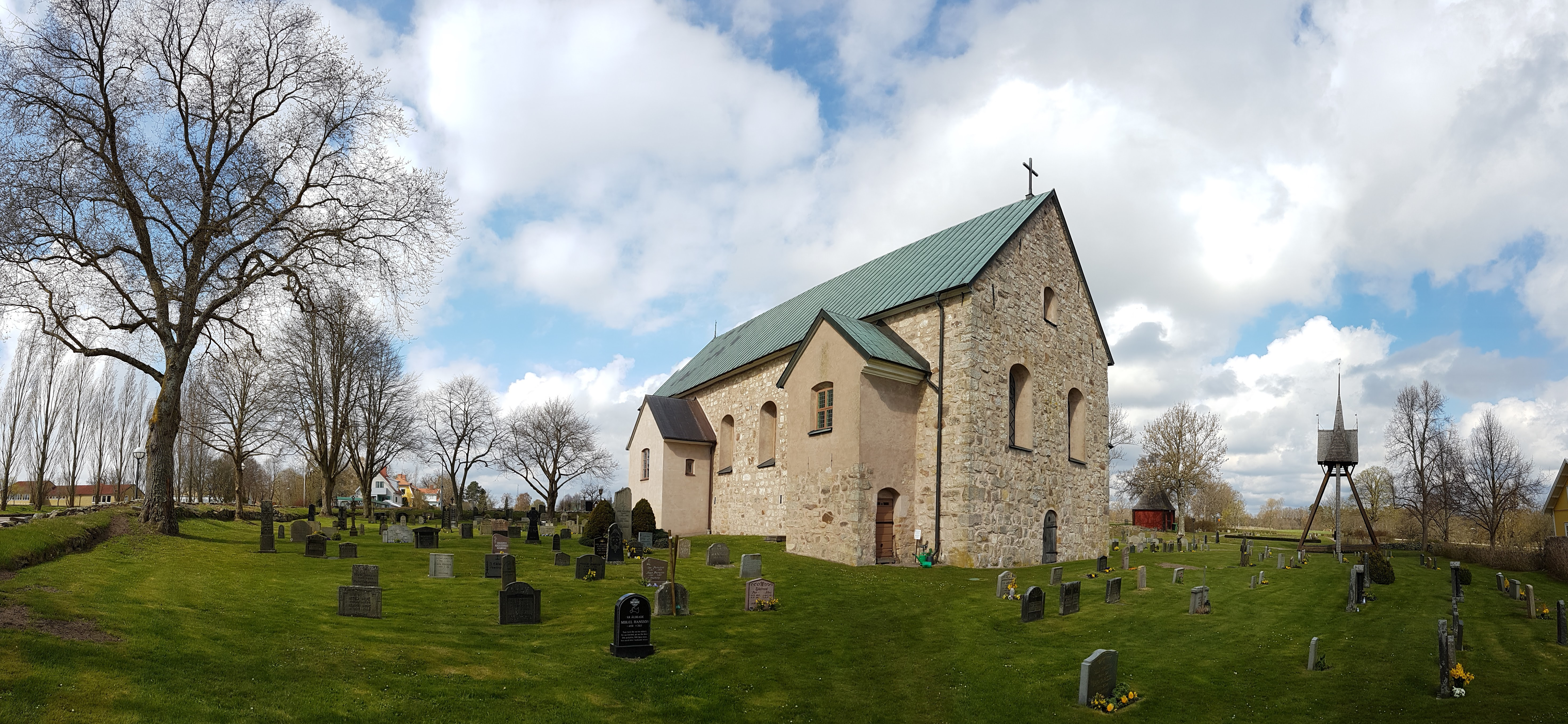

- Location within Kalmar Location within Sweden
- Coordinates: 56°30′N 16°06′E
- Country: Sweden
- Province: Småland
- County: Kalmar County
- Municipality: Kalmar Municipality

Area
  - Total: 0.62 km^{2} (0.24 sq mi)

Population (31 December 2010)
  - Total: 266
  - Density: 428/km^{2} (1,110/sq mi)
- Time zone: UTC+1 (CET)
  - Summer (DST): UTC+2 (CEST)

Halltorp is a locality situated in Kalmar Municipality, Kalmar County, Sweden with 266 inhabitants in 2010.
