= Donald F. Duncan Sr. =

American entrepreneur, inventor and toymaker

Donald Franklin Duncan Sr.
- Born: June 6, 1892; Kansas City, Missouri
- Died: May 15, 1971 (aged 78); Palm Springs, California
- Known for: Marketing of the Yo-yo and making it a commercial success

This is about the American manufacturer. For others, see Donald Duncan (disambiguation).

Donald Franklin Duncan Sr. (June 6, 1892 – May 15, 1971) was an American entrepreneur and inventor, and founder of the Duncan Toys Company. He is known for marketing of the Yo-yo, and making it a commercial success.

== Career ==
Duncan is most commonly associated with the Yo-yo, the commercial success and iconic status they enjoyed during the 20th century in the United States and the world being largely the result of his marketing efforts. Duncan is often miscredited with invention of the Yo-Yo. The name Yo-Yo was a trademark of his company from 1930 until 1965, when the case Donald F. Duncan, Inc. v. Royal Tops Mfg. Co., 343 F.2d 655 (7th Cir. 1965) resulted in a federal court of appeals ruling in favor of the Royal Tops Company, asserting that the trademark had become a part of common speech.

Duncan, who was born in Kansas City, Missouri, founded other companies, including the Good Humor mobile frozen treats franchise and a parking meter manufacturing company. Most notable among the innovations credited to Duncan is the concept of the premium incentive, a marketing tactic wherein the consumer is encouraged to collect proofs of purchase and redeem them for rewards, such as small toys or discount coupons.

He died in Palm Springs, California due to "the effects of a stroke."

Duncan's Birthday has been immortalized as National Yo-Yo Day, June 6.
