= Kalmar Municipality =

Kalmar Municipality Kalmar kommun
- Municipality
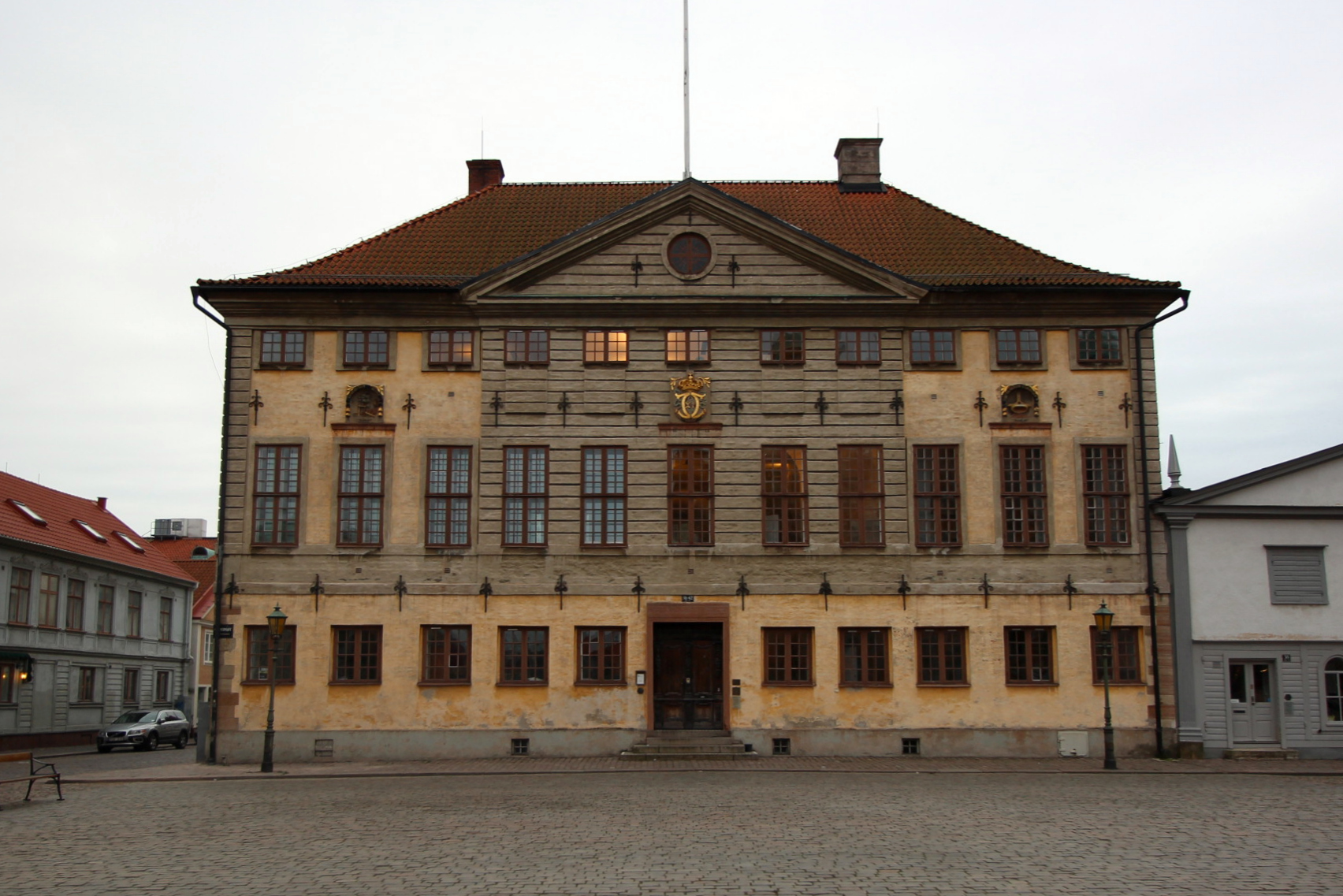
- Kalmar City Hall

- Flag Coat of arms

- Coordinates: 56°40′N 16°22′E
- Country: Sweden
- County: Kalmar County
- Seat: Kalmar

Area
  - Total: 1,250.96 km^{2} (483.00 sq mi)
  - Land: 956.9 km^{2} (369.5 sq mi)
  - Water: 294.06 km^{2} (113.54 sq mi)
- Area as of 1 January 2014.

Population (30 June 2025)
  - Total: 72,657
  - Density: 75.93/km^{2} (196.7/sq mi)
- Time zone: UTC+1 (CET)
  - Summer (DST): UTC+2 (CEST)
- ISO 3166 code: SE
- Province: Småland
- Municipal code: 0880
- Website: www.kalmar.se
- Density is calculated using land area only.

Kalmar Municipality (Swedish: Kalmar kommun) is a municipality in Kalmar County, southeastern Sweden. The city of Kalmar is the municipal seat.

The present municipality was created in 1971, when the City of Kalmar was amalgamated with five surrounding rural municipalities. The municipality consists of fifteen original local government units.

== Localities ==
There are 16 urban areas (also called a Tätort or locality) in Kalmar Municipality.

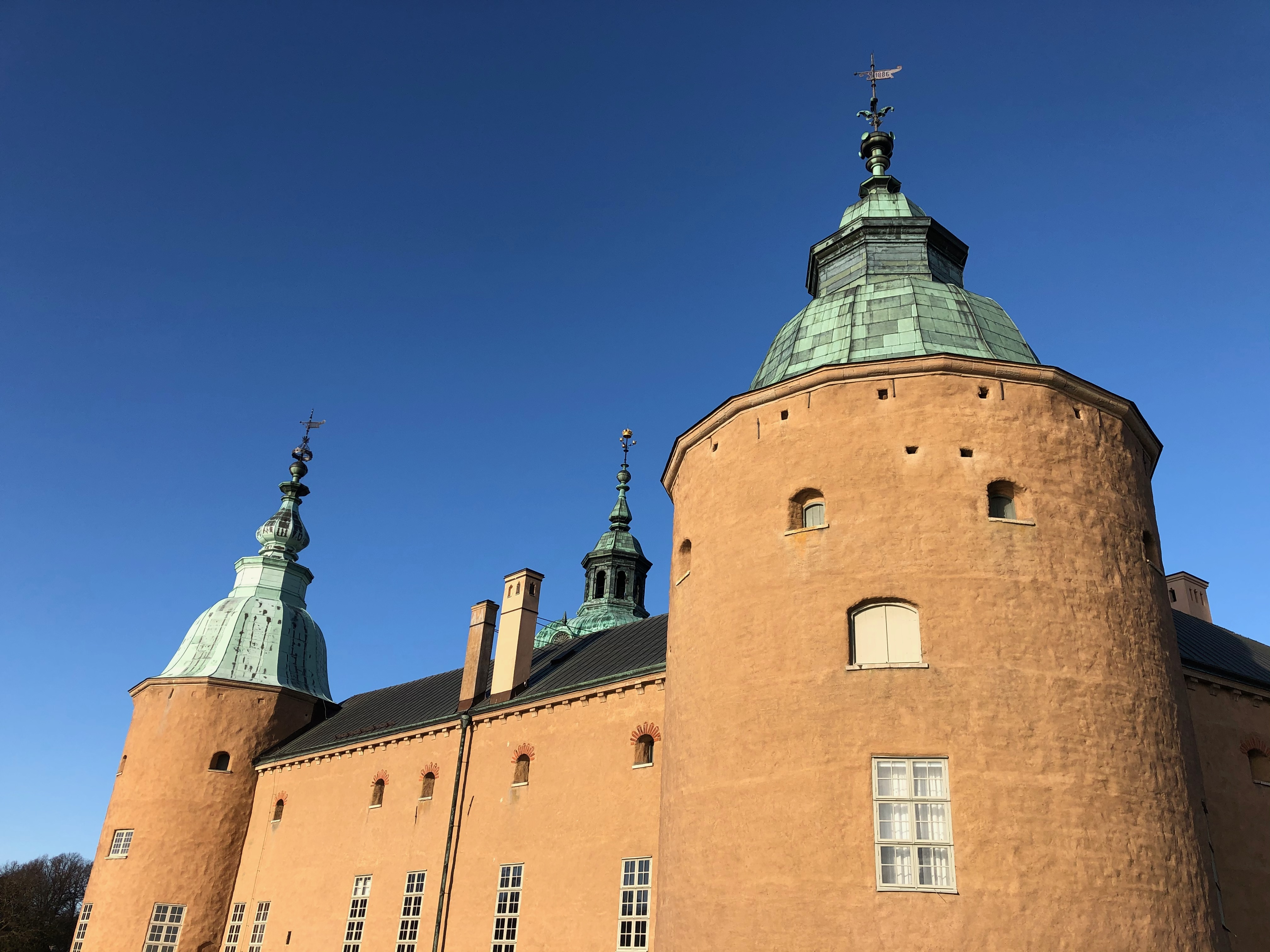
Kalmar castle

In the table the localities are listed according to the size of the population as of December 31, 2019. The municipal seat is in bold characters.

#	Locality	Population
1	**Kalmar**	41,110
2	Lindsdal	5,958
3	Smedby	3,658
4	Ljungbyholm	1,809
5	Rinkabyholm	1,659
6	Trekanten	1,608
7	Rockneby	960
8	Läckeby	943
9	Hagby	831
10	Påryd	685
11	Drag	550
12	Vassmolösa	534
13	Dunö	430
14	Tvärskog	394
15	Åmunnen	343
16	Halltorp	286

== Demographics ==
This is a demographic table based on Kalmar Municipality's electoral districts in the 2022 Swedish general election sourced from SVT's election platform, in turn taken from SCB official statistics.

In total there were 54,430 Swedish citizens of voting age resident in the municipality. 48.4 % voted for the left coalition and 50.5 % for the right coalition. Indicators are in percentage points except population totals and income.

Location	Residents	Citizen adults	Left vote	Right vote	Employed	Swedish parents	Foreign heritage	Income SEK	Degree
Location			%	%					
Berga	2,120	1,611	47.8	51.7	88	91	9	32,411	64
Berga C	2,098	1,644	52.9	45.6	74	68	32	20,807	33
Bergavik	1,629	1,216	46.7	52.2	87	84	16	30,744	58
Björkenäs	1,289	1,035	49.0	50.6	82	86	14	27,948	63
Djurängen V	1,543	1,260	55.6	42.8	70	71	29	21,565	43
Djurängen Ö	1,933	1,794	49.1	49.6	77	78	22	22,566	46
Drag-Revsudden	1,429	1,079	41.6	57.8	87	92	8	29,606	52
Falkenberg	1,843	1,500	57.9	40.8	71	76	24	21,466	52
Funkabo	1,804	1,301	58.4	40.2	70	64	36	20,046	39
Gamla stan	1,796	1,546	47.7	51.4	81	90	10	27,873	57
Getinge-Tallhagen	1,246	960	49.8	49.5	75	87	13	28,844	67
Hagby Vassmolösa S	1,941	1,521	47.6	51.2	87	91	9	25,734	41
Halltorp-Voxtorp	1,022	794	39.8	59.2	83	91	9	24,952	40
Kalmarsundsparken	1,467	1,230	47.0	52.5	88	92	8	32,806	67
Kvarnholmen	1,991	1,805	47.2	51.7	82	87	13	27,507	52
Lindsdal NO	1,523	1,106	51.3	47.5	84	87	13	25,649	42
Lindsdal NV-Förlösa	1,648	1,271	40.4	58.7	88	91	9	29,298	47
Lindsdal SO-Fjölebro	1,964	1,322	47.1	52.2	91	87	13	29,275	54
Lindsdal SV-Kläckeberga	1,537	1,109	48.2	50.4	83	80	20	26,515	45
Ljungbyholm-Vassmolösa	2,503	1,836	43.5	55.5	87	90	10	28,125	47
Läckeby	1,771	1,300	42.7	56.8	87	93	7	28,176	41
Malmen S	1,201	956	48.7	50.4	71	80	20	23,397	55
Malmen V	1,882	1,552	53.2	45.8	72	82	18	24,281	53
Malmen-Norrgårdsgärdet	1,843	1,768	49.6	49.0	80	88	12	25,870	52
Norrgårdsgärdet V	1,134	1,002	47.0	51.6	81	84	16	24,955	46
Norrliden V	2,020	1,227	66.1	31.1	65	38	62	18,201	29
Norrliden Ö	2,030	1,195	67.8	29.3	59	38	62	16,211	29
Oxhagen	1,851	1,329	60.7	37.8	67	55	45	19,015	34
Påryd	922	732	44.3	54.3	76	84	16	20,757	25
Rinkabyholm S-Hossmo	2,179	1,486	41.7	57.1	90	95	5	32,119	61
Rockneby	1,453	1,115	40.7	57.8	85	93	7	26,592	34
Sandås-Stensberg	2,008	1,606	46.6	52.0	81	86	14	25,794	53
Skälby	1,269	1,009	53.8	44.7	64	79	21	16,704	51
Smedby S-Rinkabyholm N	1,807	1,280	43.8	55.9	88	90	10	30,348	54
Smedby V	1,540	1,076	56.6	41.5	69	60	40	21,191	33
Smedby Ö	1,729	1,194	50.9	47.3	82	79	21	26,328	39
Snurrom	1,219	781	43.5	55.1	77	72	28	22,536	35
Tegelviken-Johannesborg	1,678	1,317	50.6	48.5	83	89	11	29,154	56
Trekanten	2,310	1,649	38.0	60.6	87	90	10	27,836	40
Tvärskog	1,168	855	46.2	52.9	85	91	9	26,174	34
Vimpeltorpet	2,468	1,712	45.2	54.3	86	78	22	30,102	55
Ängö-Varvsholmen	1,437	1,349	36.4	62.7	85	92	8	30,709	56
Source: SVT

== International relations ==
=== Twin towns — sister cities ===
Kalmar is twinned with:

- Gdańsk, Poland (since 1991)
- Kaliningrad, Russia
- Wilmington, Delaware, United States
- Savonlinna, Finland
- Samsun, Turkey
- Panevėžys, Lithuania
