= Brazil =

Country in South America

Federative Republic of Brazil República Federativa do Brasil
- Flag Coat of arms
- Motto: Ordem e Progresso "Order and Progress"
- Anthem: Hino Nacional Brasileiro "Brazilian National Anthem" Flag anthem: Hino à Bandeira Nacional "National Flag Anthem"
- Seal: Selo Nacional do Brasil National Seal of Brazil

- Capital: Brasília; 15°47′S 47°52′W
- Largest city: São Paulo; 23°33′S 46°38′W
- Official language and national language: Portuguese (Note: According to Article 13 of the Constitution: A língua portuguesa é o idioma oficial da República Federativa do Brasil ("The Portuguese language is the official language of the Federative Republic of Brazil"). Brazilian Sign Language is also officially recognized and protected. 95 municipalities and 3 Brazilian states also have co-official languages, with 61 co-officialized languages. The list can be seen at Languages of Brazil.)
- Recognized regional languages: See regional official languages
- Ethnic groups (2022): 45.3% Pardo; 43.5% White; 10.2% Black; 0.6% Indigenous; 0.4% East Asian (Note: The Brazilian census uses the term amarela (or yellow in English) as a racial category to describe people of East Asian background. This category therefore excludes those of other Asian origins, such as West Asians/Arabs and South Asians.)
- Religion (2022): 83.6% Christianity; 56.7% Catholic; 26.9% Protestant; 9.3% no religion; 1.8% Spiritism; 1.1% Afro-Brazilian religions; 4.2% others
- Demonym: Brazilian
- Government: Federal presidential republic
  - President: Luiz Inácio Lula da Silva
  - Vice President: Geraldo Alckmin
  - President of the Chamber of Deputies: Hugo Motta
  - President of the Federal Senate: Davi Alcolumbre
  - President of the Supreme Federal Court: Edson Fachin
- Legislature: National Congress
  - Upper house: Federal Senate
  - Lower house: Chamber of Deputies

Independence from Portugal
  - Declaration: 7 September 1822
  - Recognition: 29 August 1825
  - Republic: 15 November 1889
  - Current constitution: 5 October 1988

Area
  - Total: 8,510,346 km^{2} (3,285,863 sq mi) (5th)
  - Water (%): 0.65

Population
  - 2026 estimate: ▲214,211,951 (7th)
  - 2022 census: ▲203,080,756 (7th)
  - Density: 23.8/km^{2} (61.6/sq mi) (193rd)
- GDP (PPP): 2026 estimate
  - Total: ▲$5.267 trillion (8th)
  - Per capita: ▲$24,594 (82nd)
- GDP (nominal): 2026 estimate
  - Total: ▲$2.655 trillion (10th)
  - Per capita: ▲$12,397 (84th)
- Gini (2024): ▼50.3 high inequality
- HDI (2023): ▲0.786 high (84th)
- Currency: Real (R$) (BRL)
- Time zone: UTC−02:00 to −05:00 (BT)
- Date format: dd/mm/yyyy (CE)
- Calling code: +55
- ISO 3166 code: BR
- Internet TLD: .br

Brazil, (Note: Portuguese: Brasil, pronounced [bɾaˈziw].) officially the Federative Republic of Brazil, (Note: Portuguese: República Federativa do Brasil, pronounced [ʁeˈpublikɐ fedeɾaˈtʃivɐ du bɾaˈziw].) is the largest country in South America, the world's fifth-largest country by area, and the seventh-largest country by population, with over 214 million people. Brazil is a federation composed of 26 states and a Federal District, which hosts the capital, Brasília. Its most populous city is São Paulo, followed by Rio de Janeiro. Brazil has the largest Lusophone population in the world and is the only Portuguese-speaking country in the Americas, where it is the official language.

Bounded by the Atlantic Ocean on the east, Brazil has a coastline of 7,491 kilometers (4,655 mi), among the longest in the world. Covering roughly half of South America's land area, it borders all other countries and territories on the continent except Ecuador and Chile. Brazil encompasses a wide range of tropical and subtropical landscapes, as well as wetlands, savannas, plateaus, and low mountains. It contains most of the Amazon basin, including the world's largest river system and most extensive virgin tropical forest. Brazil has diverse wildlife, a variety of ecological systems, and extensive natural resources spanning numerous protected habitats. It ranks first among 17 megadiverse countries, with its natural heritage being the subject of significant global interest, as environmental degradation (through processes such as deforestation) directly affect global issues such as climate change and biodiversity loss.

Brazil was inhabited by various indigenous peoples prior to the landing of Portuguese explorer Pedro Álvares Cabral in 1500. The territory was subsequently claimed and settled by Portugal, which founded São Vicente in 1532 and imported enslaved Africans to work on plantations. Brazil remained a colony until 1815, when it was elevated to a united kingdom with Portugal after the transfer of the Portuguese court to Rio de Janeiro. Prince Pedro of Braganza declared Brazilian independence in 1822 and, after waging a war against Portugal, established the Empire of Brazil. The constitution of 1824 established a bicameral legislature and enshrined principles such as freedom of religion and freedom of the press; slavery was gradually outlawed until its final abolition in 1888. Brazil became a presidential republic following a military coup d'état in 1889. An armed revolution in 1930 ended the First Republic and brought Getúlio Vargas to power. Vargas' self-coup in 1937 ushered the authoritarian Estado Novo, in which he oversaw Brazil's involvement in World War II. Democracy was restored after Vargas' ousting in 1945. An authoritarian military dictatorship emerged in 1964 with support from the United States and ruled until 1985, after which civilian governance resumed. Brazil's current constitution, enacted in 1988, defines it as a democratic federal republic.

Brazil is a regional and middle power and has been described as a rising global power. It is an emerging, upper-middle income economy and newly industrialized country; Brazil has one of the 10 largest economies in the world in both nominal and PPP terms, the largest economy in Latin America and the Southern Hemisphere, and the largest share of wealth in South America. With a complex and highly diversified economy, Brazil is one of the world's major or primary exporters of various agricultural goods, mineral resources, and manufactured products. The country ranks thirteenth in the world by number of UNESCO World Heritage Sites. Brazil is a founding member of the United Nations, the G20, BRICS, G4, Mercosur, Organization of American States, Organization of Ibero-American States, and the Community of Portuguese Language Countries; it is also an observer state of the Arab League and a major non-NATO ally of the United States.

== Etymology ==
The word Brazil probably comes from the Portuguese word for brazilwood, a tree that once grew plentifully along the Brazilian coast. In Portuguese, brazilwood is called pau-brasil, with the word brasil commonly given the etymology 'red like an ember', formed from brasa ('ember') and the suffix -il (from -iculum or -ilium). It has alternatively been suggested that this is a folk etymology for a word for the plant related to an Arabic or Asian word for a red plant. As brazilwood produces a deep red dye, it was highly valued by the European textile industry and was the earliest commercially exploited product from Brazil. Throughout the 16th century, massive amounts of brazilwood were harvested by indigenous peoples (mostly Tupi) along the Brazilian coast, who sold the timber to European traders in return for assorted European consumer goods.

The official Portuguese name of the land, in original Portuguese records, was the 'Land of the Holy Cross' (Terra da Santa Cruz), but European sailors and merchants commonly called it the 'Land of Brazil' (Terra do Brasil) because of the brazilwood trade. Popular usage eclipsed and eventually supplanted the official Portuguese name. Some early sailors called it the 'Land of Parrots'. In the Guarani language, Brazil is called Pindorama, meaning 'land of the palm trees'.

== History ==
=== Pre-Cabraline era ===
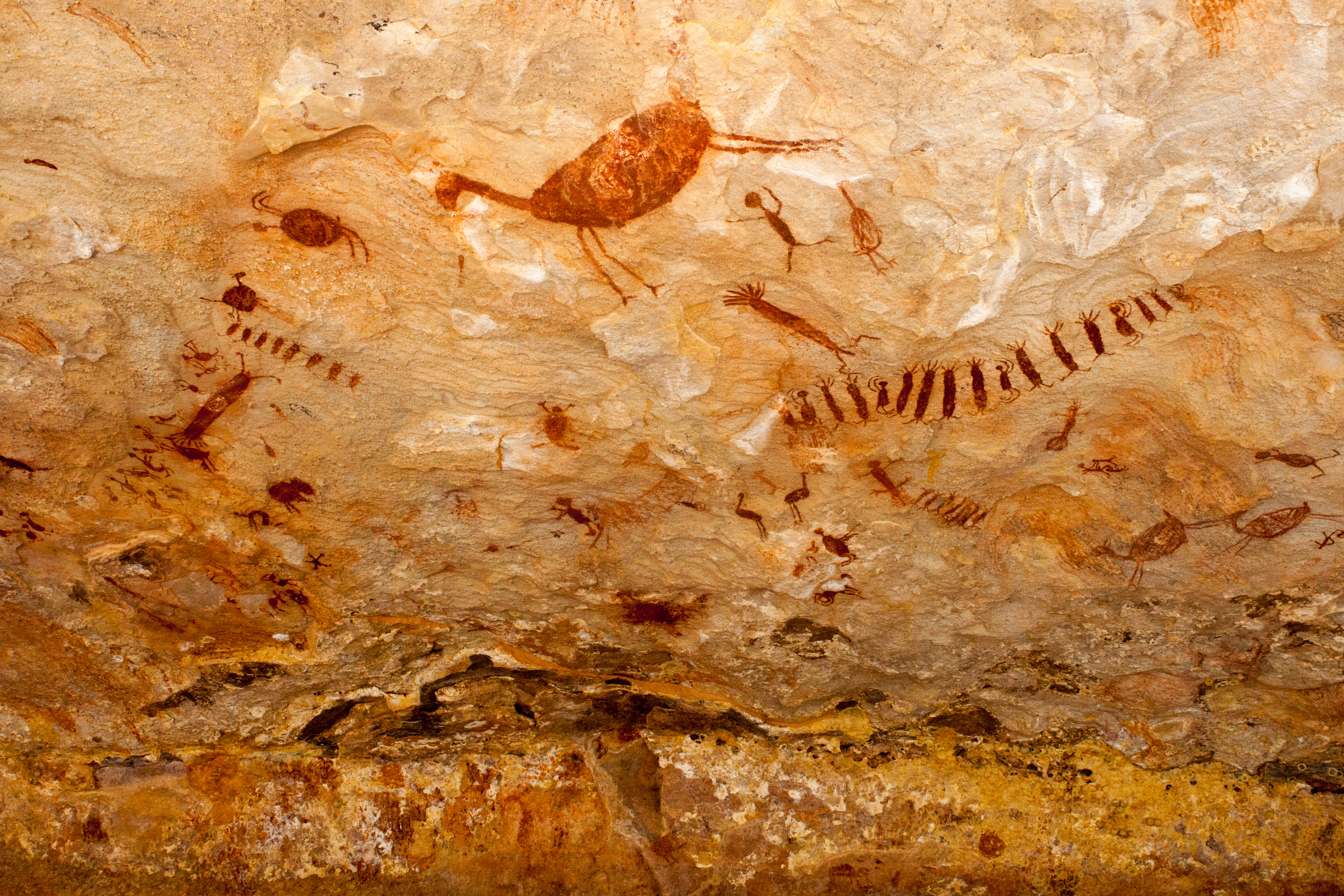
Rock art at Serra da Capivara National Park, one of the largest and oldest concentrations of prehistoric sites in the Americas

Some of the earliest human remains found in the Americas, Luzia Woman, were found in the area of Pedro Leopoldo, Minas Gerais, and provide evidence of human habitation going back at least 11,000 years. The earliest pottery found in the Western Hemisphere was excavated in the Amazon basin and radiocarbon dated to over 8,000 years ago (6000 BC). The pottery was found near Santarém and provides evidence that the region supported a complex prehistoric culture. The Marajoara culture flourished on Marajó in the Amazon Delta from AD 400 to 1400, developing sophisticated pottery, social stratification, large populations, mound building, and complex social formations such as chiefdoms.

Around the time of the Portuguese arrival, the territory had an estimated Indigenous population of 7 million people, mostly semi-nomadic, who subsisted on hunting, fishing, gathering, and migrant agriculture. The population comprised several large Indigenous ethnic groups (e.g., the Tupis, Guaranis, and Gês. The Tupi people were subdivided into the Tupiniquins and Tupinambás.

Before the arrival of the Europeans, the boundaries between these groups and their subgroups were marked by wars that arose from differences in culture, language and moral beliefs. These wars also involved large-scale military actions on land and water, with cannibalistic rituals on prisoners of war. While heredity had some weight, leadership was a status more won over time than assigned in succession ceremonies and conventions. Slavery had a different meaning than it had for Europeans, since it originated from a diverse socioeconomic organization in which asymmetries were translated into kinship relations.

=== European colonization and Colonial Brazil ===
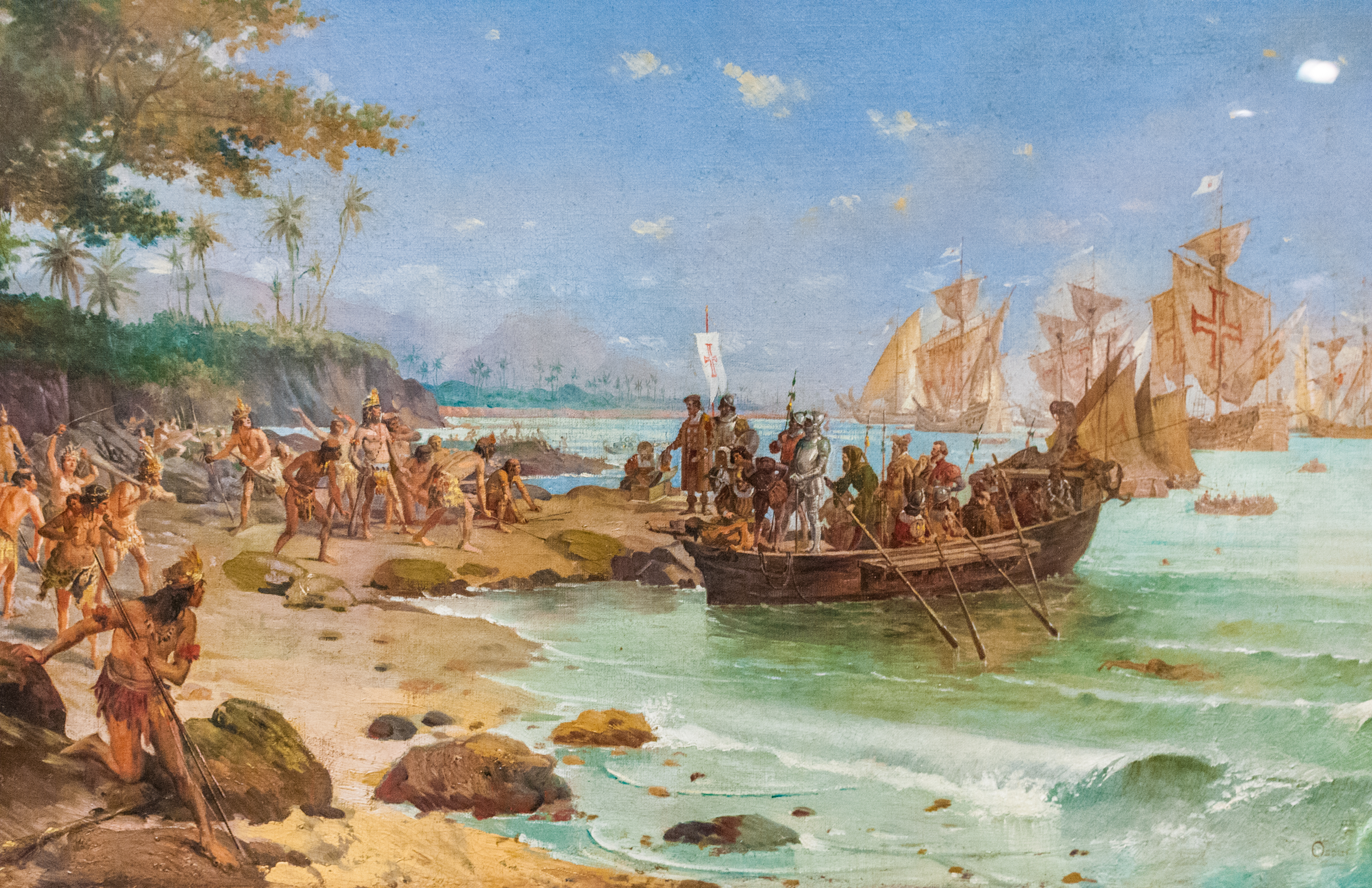
Pedro Álvares Cabral landing in Porto Seguro in 1500

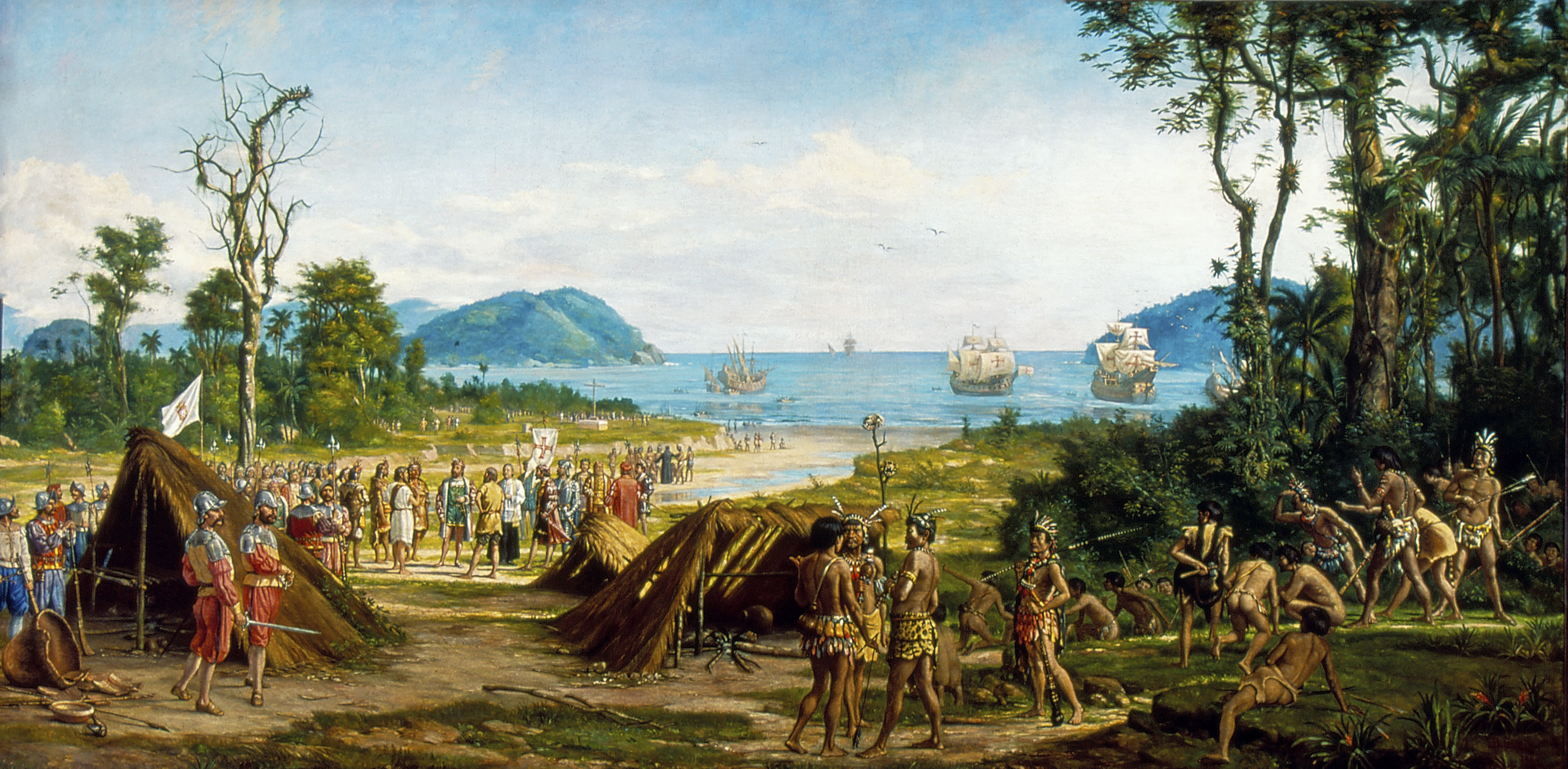
The founding of São Vicente, in what is now the state of São Paulo, marks the effective beginning of colonization in Brazil, in 1532.

Following the 1494 Treaty of Tordesillas, the land now called Brazil was claimed for the Portuguese Empire on 22 April 1500, with the arrival of the Portuguese fleet commanded by Pedro Álvares Cabral. Along the coast, the Portuguese encountered various Indigenous communities, most of whom spoke languages of the Tupi–Guarani family. The first settlement São Vicente was founded in 1532, and colonization effectively began in 1534, when King John III of Portugal divided the territory into the fifteen private and autonomous captaincies. However, the decentralized and unorganized captaincy system proved unsuccessful, and in 1549 John restructured them into the Governorate General of Brazil in Salvador, which became the capital of a single and centralized Portuguese colony in South America. In the first two centuries of colonization, Indigenous and European groups lived in constant war, establishing opportunistic alliances in order to gain advantages against each other.

By the mid-16th century, cane sugar had become Brazil's most important export, while slaves purchased in Sub-Saharan Africa in the slave market of Western Africa (not only those from Portuguese allies of their colonies in Angola and Mozambique) had become its largest import to cope with sugarcane plantations, due to increasing international demand for sugar. Brazil received more than 2.8 million slaves from Africa between the 16th and 19th century.

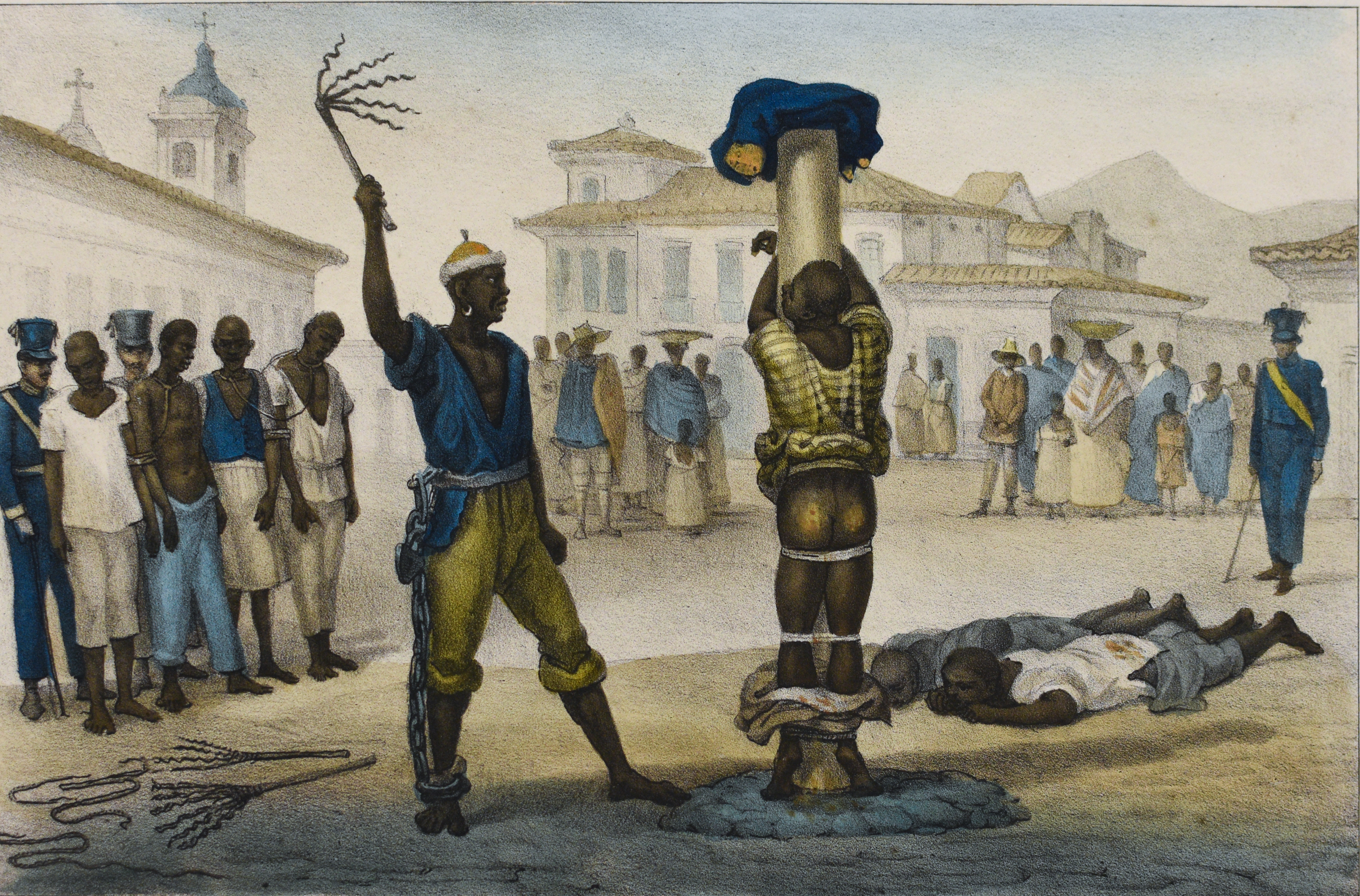
Execution of the Punishment of the Whip by Jean-Baptiste Debret. Nearly 5 million enslaved Africans were imported to Brazil during the Atlantic slave trade, more than any other country.

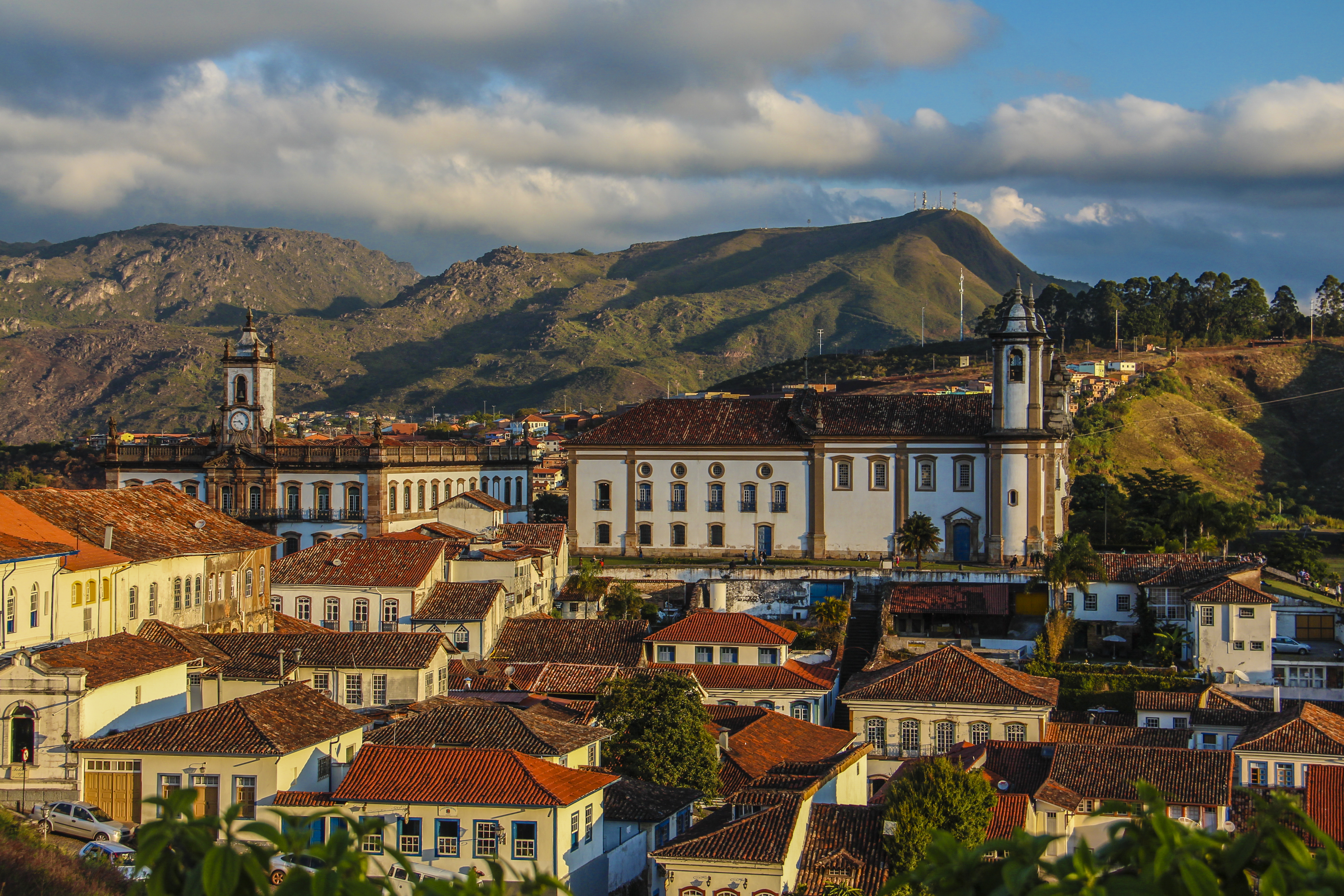
Ouro Preto was the center of the Brazilian Gold Rush and was designated a World Heritage Site by UNESCO due to its Baroque colonial architecture.

By the end of the 17th century, sugar exports began to decline, and the discovery of gold by bandeirantes in the 1690s would become the new backbone of the colony's economy, fostering a Brazilian gold rush which attracted thousands of new settlers from Portugal and other Portuguese colonies around the world. This increased level of immigration in turn caused some conflicts between newcomers and old settlers.

Portuguese expeditions known as bandeiras gradually expanded Brazil's original colonial frontiers to its approximately current borders. In this era, other European powers tried to colonize parts of Brazil, in incursions that the Portuguese had to fight, notably the French in Rio during the 1560s, in Maranhão during the 1610s, and the Dutch in Bahia and Pernambuco, during the Dutch–Portuguese War.

The Portuguese colonial administration had two objectives that would ensure colonial order and the monopoly of Portugal's wealthiest and largest colony: to keep under control and eradicate all forms of slave rebellion and resistance, such as the Quilombo of Palmares, and to repress all movements for autonomy or independence, such as the Inconfidência Mineira (1789).

=== Kingdom of Brazil ===
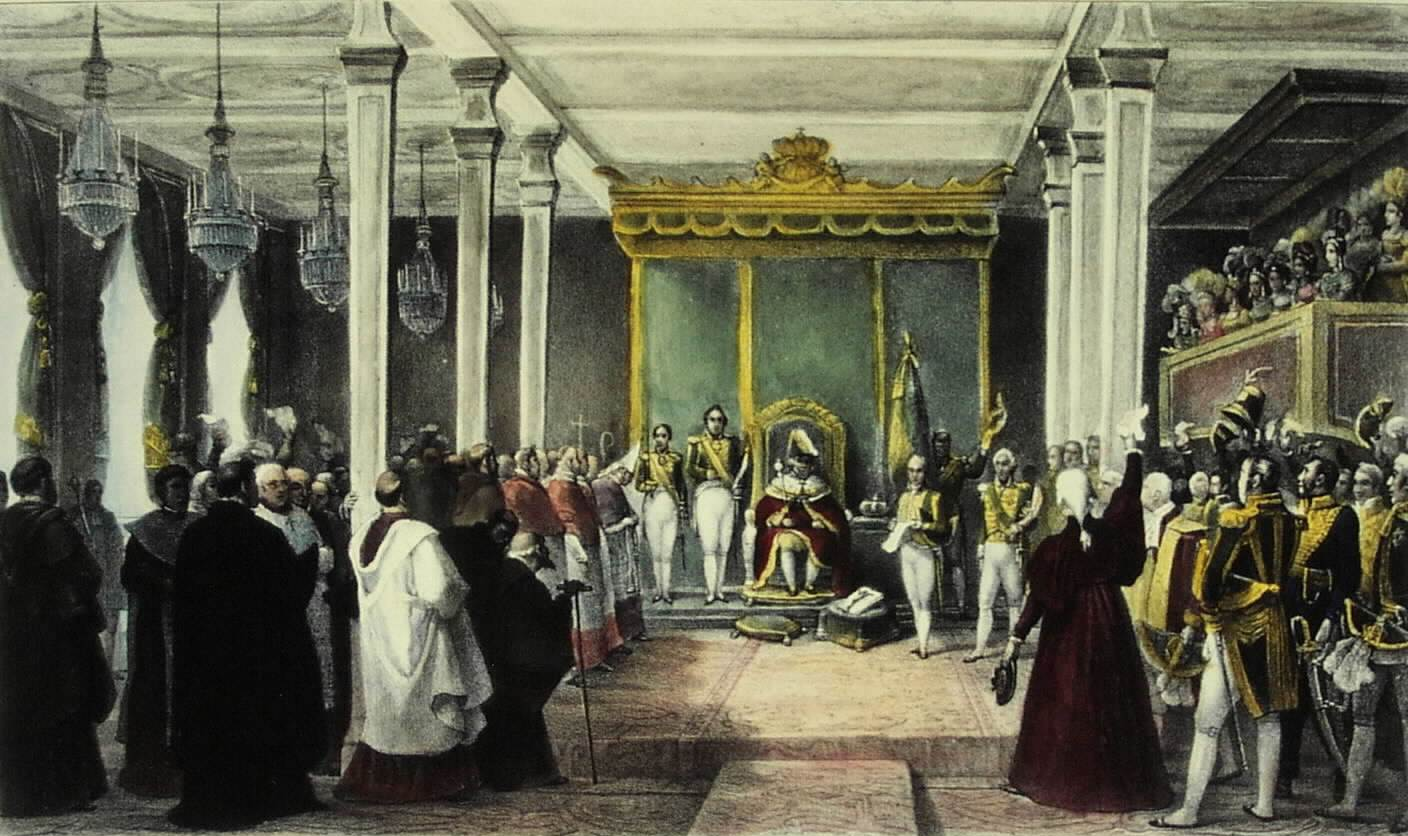
The Acclamation of King João VI of the United Kingdom of Portugal, Brazil and the Algarves in Rio de Janeiro, 6 February 1818

In late 1807, Spanish and Napoleonic forces threatened the security of continental Portugal, causing Prince Regent John, in the name of Queen Maria I, to move the royal court from Lisbon to Rio de Janeiro. There they established some of Brazil's first financial institutions, such as its local stock exchanges and its National Bank, additionally ending the Portuguese monopoly on Brazilian trade and opening Brazil's ports to other nations. In 1809, in retaliation for being forced into exile, the Prince Regent ordered the conquest of French Guiana.

With the end of the Peninsular War in 1814, the courts of Europe demanded that Queen Maria I and Prince Regent John return to Portugal, deeming it unfit for the head of an ancient European monarchy to reside in a colony. In 1815, to justify continuing to live in Brazil where the royal court had thrived for six years, the Crown established the United Kingdom of Portugal, Brazil and the Algarves, thus creating a pluricontinental transatlantic monarchic state. However, the leadership in Portugal, resentful of the new status of its larger colony, continued to demand the return of the court to Lisbon. In 1821, acceding to the demands of revolutionaries who had taken the city of Porto, John VI departed for Lisbon. There he swore an oath to the new constitution, leaving his son, Prince Pedro de Alcântara, as regent of the Kingdom of Brazil.

=== Empire of Brazil ===
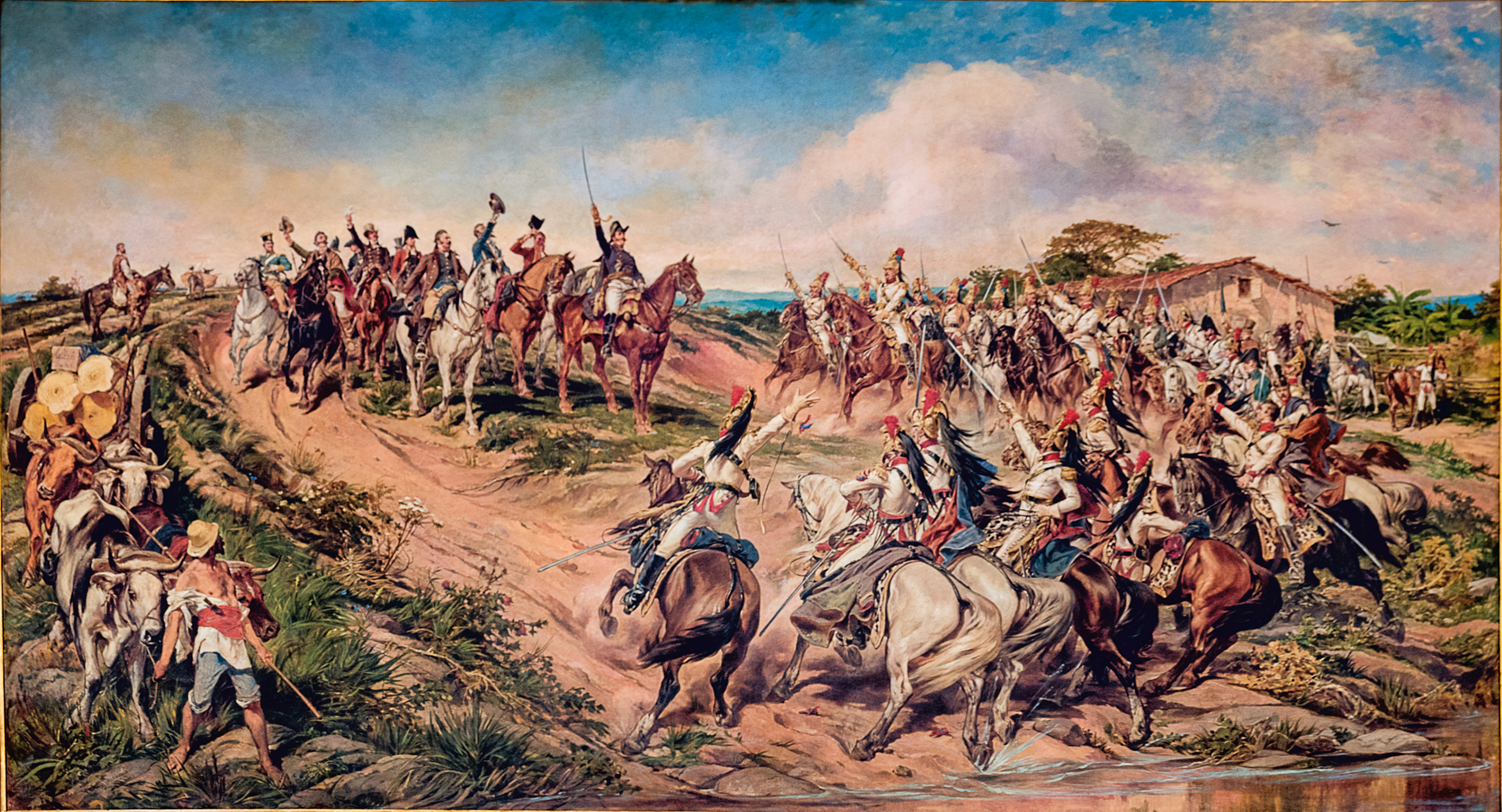
Declaration of the Independence of Brazil by Pedro I on 7 September 1822

Tensions between Portuguese and Brazilians increased, and the Portuguese Cortes, guided by the new political regime imposed by the Liberal Revolution, tried to re-establish Brazil as a colony. The Brazilians refused to yield, and Prince Pedro decided to side with them, declaring the country's independence from Portugal on 7 September 1822. A month later, Prince Pedro was proclaimed the first Emperor of Brazil, with the royal title of Dom Pedro I, resulting in the founding of the Empire of Brazil.

The Brazilian War of Independence, which had already begun along this process, spread through the northern, northeastern regions and in the Cisplatina province. The last Portuguese soldiers surrendered on 8 March 1824; Portugal officially recognized Brazilian independence on 29 August 1825.

On 7 April 1831, worn down by years of administrative turmoil and political dissent with both liberals and conservatives, including an attempt of republican secession and unreconciled to the way that absolutists in Portugal had given in the succession of John VI, Pedro I departed for Portugal to reclaim his daughter's crown after abdicating the Brazilian throne in favor of his five-year-old son and heir, Dom Pedro II.

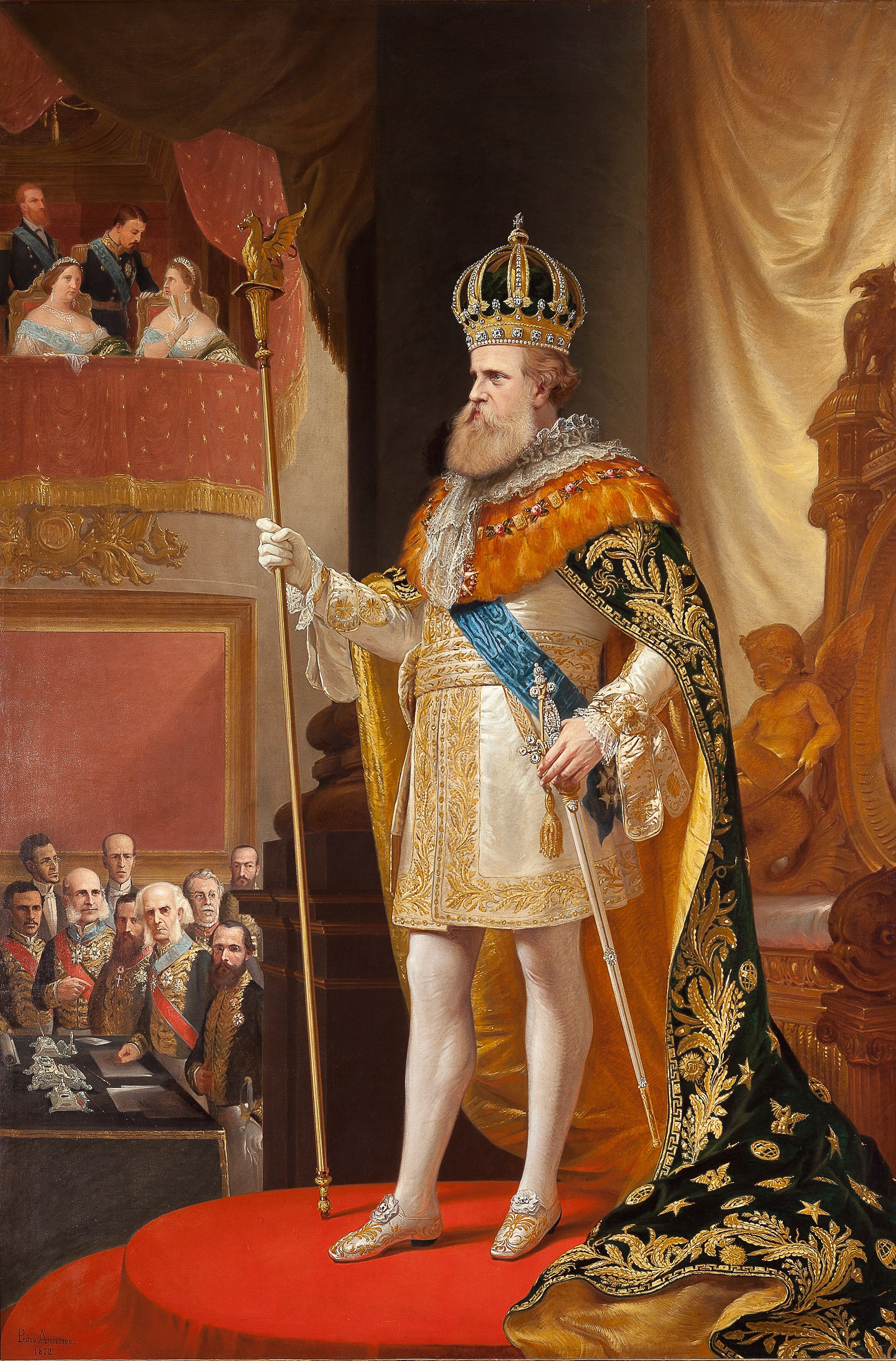
Pedro II, Emperor of Brazil between 1831 and 1889

As Pedro II could not exert his constitutional powers until he came of age, a regency was set up by the General Assembly. In the absence of a charismatic figure who could represent a moderate face of power, a series of localized rebellions took place, such as the Cabanagem in Grão-Pará, the Malê Revolt in Salvador, the Balaiada (Maranhão), the Sabinada (Bahia), and the Ragamuffin War (which began in Rio Grande do Sul and was supported by Giuseppe Garibaldi). These emerged from the provinces' dissatisfaction with the central power, coupled with old and latent social tensions peculiar to a vast, slaveholding and newly independent nation state. This period of internal political and social upheaval, which included the Praieira revolt in Pernambuco, was overcome only at the end of the 1840s, years after the end of the regency, which occurred with the premature coronation of Pedro II in 1841.

During the last phase of the monarchy, internal political debate centered on the issue of slavery. The Atlantic slave trade was outlawed in 1850, as a result of the British Aberdeen Act and the Eusébio de Queirós Law. By May 1888—after a long process of internal mobilization and debate for an ethical and legal dismantling of slavery in the country—the institution formally abolished with the approval of the Golden Law.

The foreign-affairs policies of the monarchy dealt with issues pertaining neighboring countries in the Southern Cone. Long after the Cisplatine War that resulted in the independence of Uruguay, Brazil won three international wars during the 58-year reign of Pedro II: the Platine War, the Uruguayan War and the devastating Paraguayan War, the largest war effort in Brazilian history.

Although there was no desire among the majority of Brazilians to change the country's form of government, on 15 November 1889, in disagreement with the majority of the Imperial Army officers, as well as with rural and financial elites, the monarchy was overthrown by a military coup. A few days later, the national flag was replaced with a design that included the national motto "Ordem e Progresso", influenced by positivism. 15 November is now Republic Day, a national holiday.

=== Republican governments ===
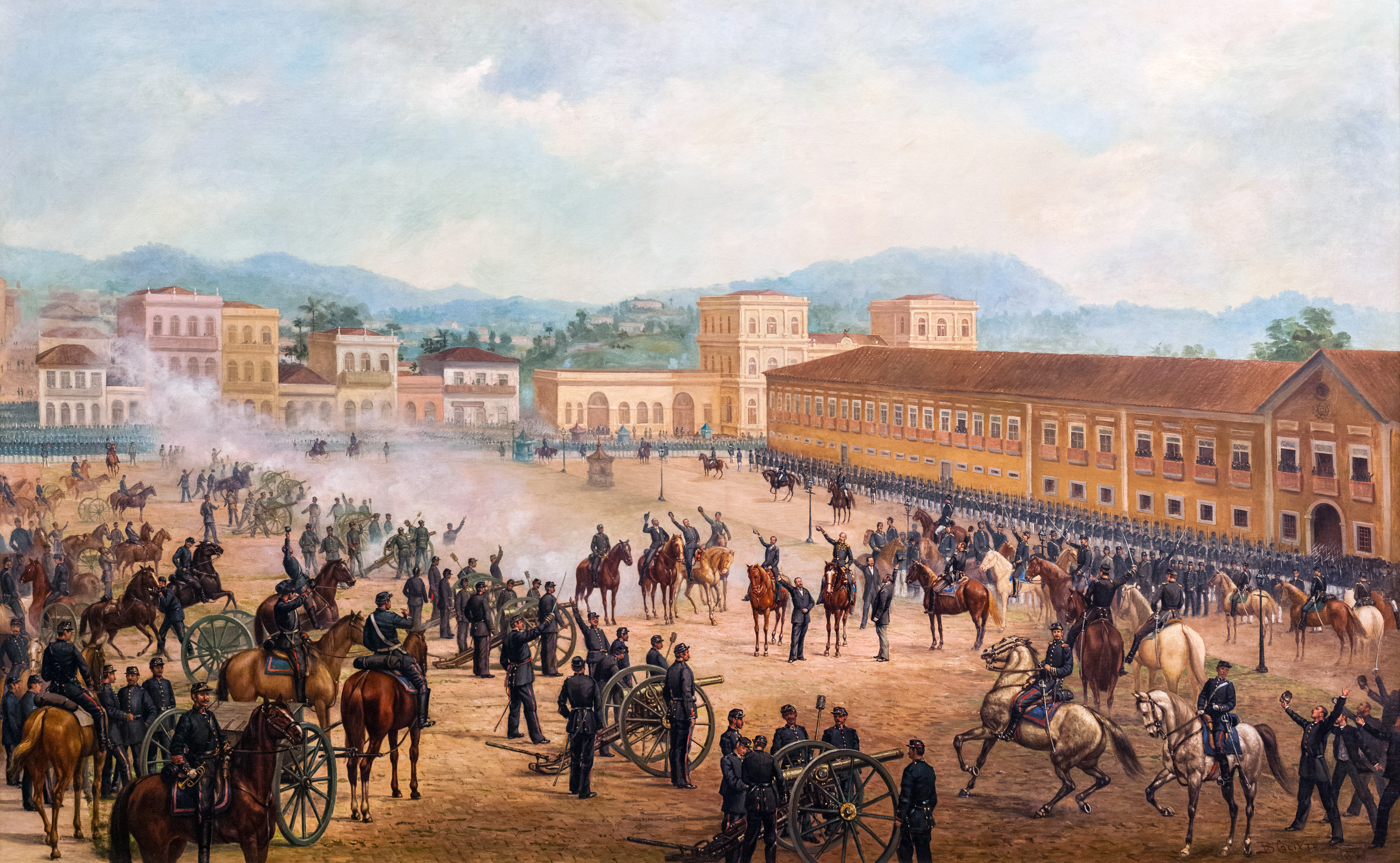
Proclamation of the Republic, 1893, oil on canvas by Benedito Calixto

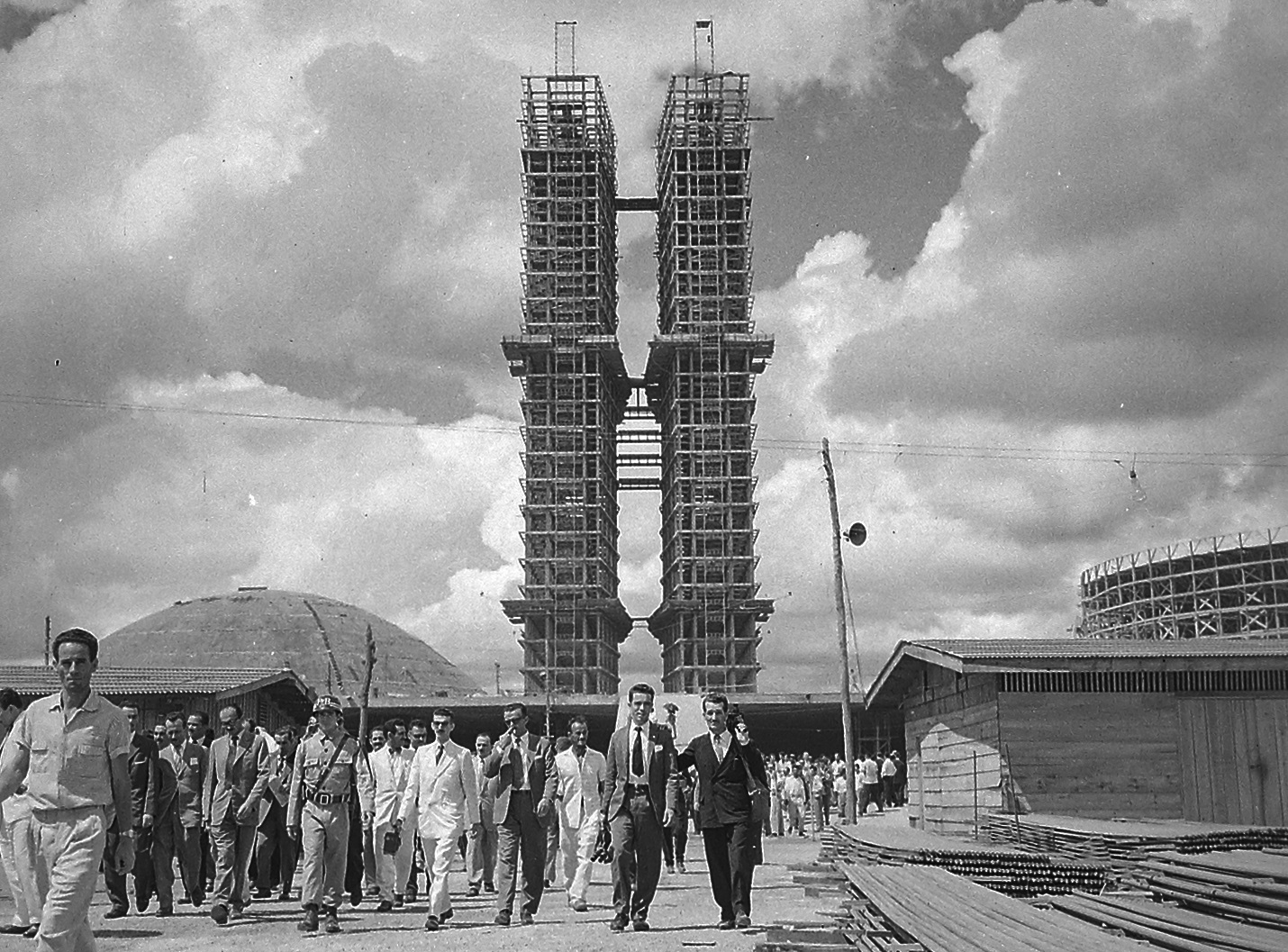
Construction of the National Congress building in Brasília, 1959, during the JK administration

The early republican government was a military dictatorship, with the army dominating affairs in Rio de Janeiro and in the states. Freedom of the press disappeared, and elections were controlled by those in power. Not until 1894, following an economic crisis and a military one, did civilians take power, remaining there until October 1930.

In this first republican period, Brazil maintained a relative balance characterized by a success in resolving border disputes with neighboring countries, only broken by the Acre War (1899–1902) and its involvement in World War I (1914–1918), followed by a failed attempt to exert a prominent role in the League of Nations; Internally, from the crisis of Encilhamento and the Navy Revolts, a prolonged cycle of financial, political and social instability lasted until the 1920s, keeping the country besieged by various rebellions, both civilian and military.

Little by little, a cycle of general instability sparked by these crises undermined the regime. The Revolution of 1930 replaced incumbent President Washington Luís with defeated presidential candidate and revolutionary leader Getúlio Vargas, concluding the political hegemony of a four-decade-old oligarchy. Vargas and the military were supposed to assume power temporarily but instead closed down Congress, extinguished the constitution, ruled with emergency powers, and replaced the states' governors with his own supporters, beginning the Vargas era.

In the 1930s, three attempts to remove Vargas and his supporters from power failed. The first was the Constitutionalist Revolution in 1932, led by São Paulo's oligarchy. The second was a communist uprising in November 1935, and the third a putsch attempt by local fascists in May 1938. The 1935 uprising created a security crisis in which Congress transferred more power to the executive branch. A 1937 coup d'état led by Vargas resulted in the cancellation of the 1938 election and formalized Vargas as dictator, beginning the Estado Novo era. During this period, government brutality and censorship of the press increased.

During World War II, Brazil remained neutral until August 1942, when the country suffered retaliation by Nazi Germany and Fascist Italy in a strategic dispute over the South Atlantic and entered the war on the allied side. In addition to its participation in the battle of the Atlantic, Brazil sent an expeditionary force to fight in the Italian campaign. With the Allied victory in 1945 and the end of the fascist regimes in Europe, Vargas' position became untenable, and he was swiftly overthrown in a military coup in 1945, with democracy reinstated by the same army that had ended it 15 years earlier.

Vargas was re-elected in 1950 and committed suicide in 1954 amid a political crisis. Several brief interim governments followed Vargas' suicide. Juscelino Kubitschek became president in 1956 and assumed a conciliatory stance towards the political opposition that allowed him to govern without major crises. The economy and industrial sector grew remarkably, but his greatest achievement was the construction of the new capital city of Brasília, inaugurated in 1960. Kubitschek's successor, Jânio Quadros, resigned in 1961 less than a year after taking office. His vice-president, João Goulart, assumed the presidency, but aroused strong political opposition and was deposed in April 1964 by a coup that resulted in a military dictatorship.

=== Military dictatorship ===
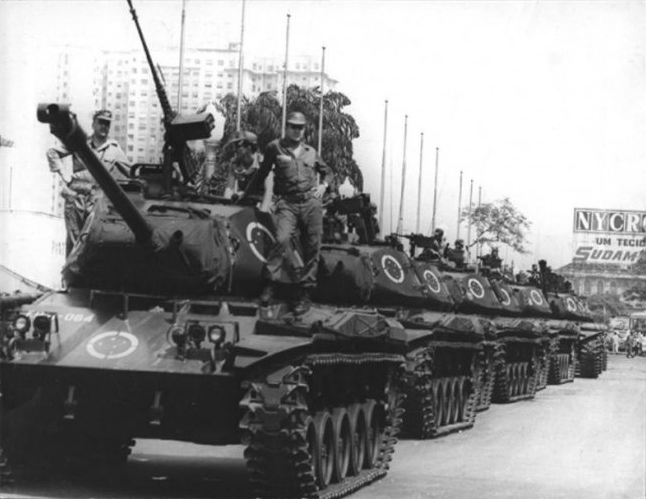
M41s along the Avenida Presidente Vargas, Rio de Janeiro, in April 1968, during the military dictatorship

The military regime was intended to be transitory but gradually closed in on itself and became a full dictatorship with the promulgation of the Fifth Institutional Act in 1968. Oppression was not limited to those who resorted to guerrilla tactics to fight the regime, but also reached institutional opponents, artists, journalists and other members of civil society, inside and outside the country through "Operation Condor". Like other authoritarian regimes, due to an economic boom known as the "economic miracle", the military dictatorship reached a peak in popularity in the early 1970s.

Slowly, however, years of dictatorial power had not slowed the repression, even after the defeat of the leftist guerrillas. The inability to deal with the economic crises of the period and popular pressure made a redemocratization policy inevitable, which from the regime side was led by Generals Ernesto Geisel and Golbery do Couto e Silva. With the enactment of the Amnesty Law in 1979, Brazil began a slow return to democracy, which was completed during the 1980s.

=== Contemporary era ===
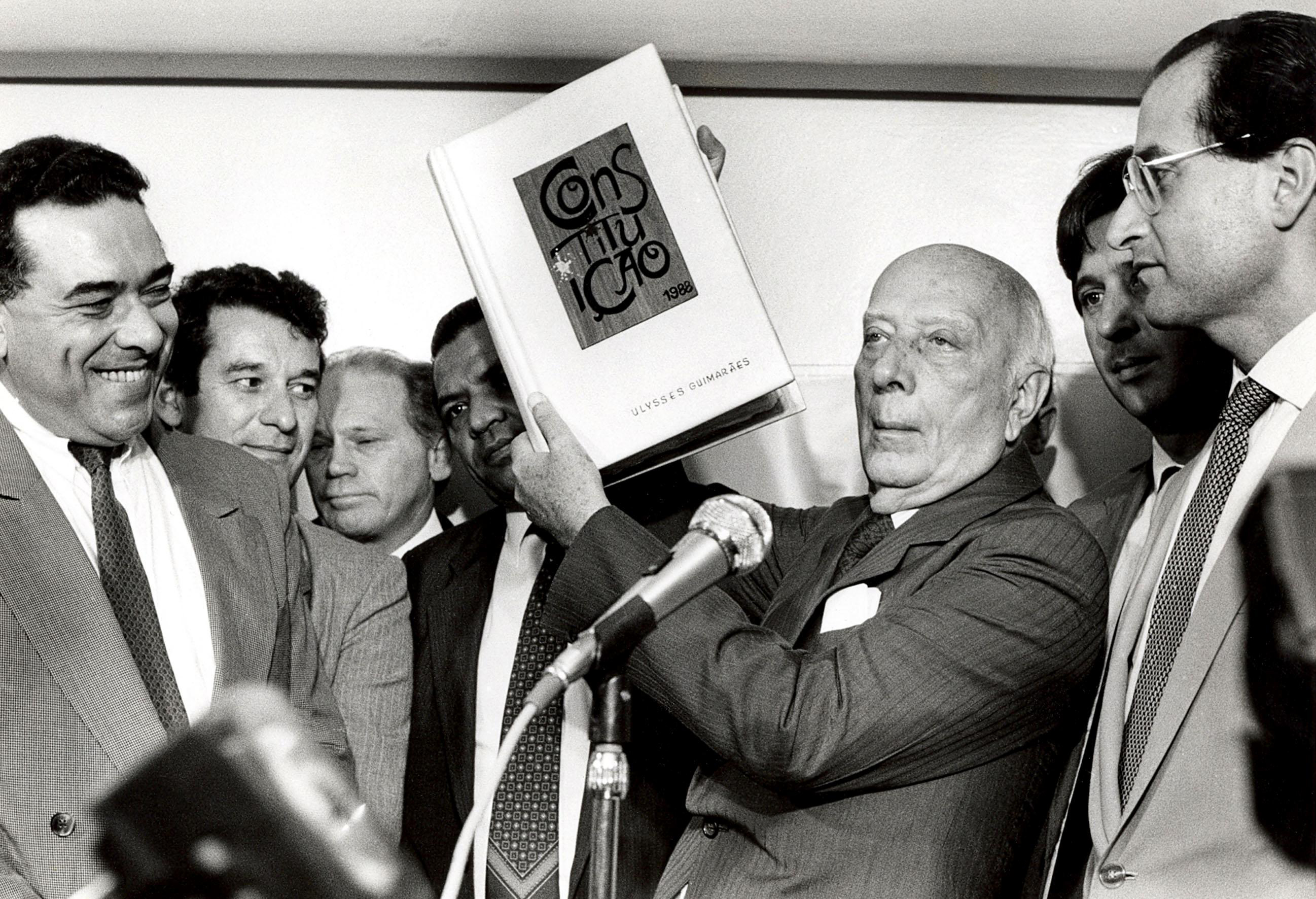
Ulysses Guimarães holding the Constitution of 1988

Civilians returned to power in 1985 when José Sarney assumed the presidency. He became unpopular during his tenure through failure to control the economic crisis and hyperinflation he inherited from the military regime. Sarney's unsuccessful government led to the election in 1989 of the almost-unknown Fernando Collor, who was subsequently impeached by the National Congress in 1992. Collor was succeeded by Vice President Itamar Franco, who appointed Fernando Henrique Cardoso as Minister of Finance. In 1994, Cardoso devised a highly successful Plano Real that finally stabilized the Brazilian economy, after decades of failed economic plans made by previous governments attempting to curb hyperinflation. Cardoso won the 1994 election, and again in 1998.

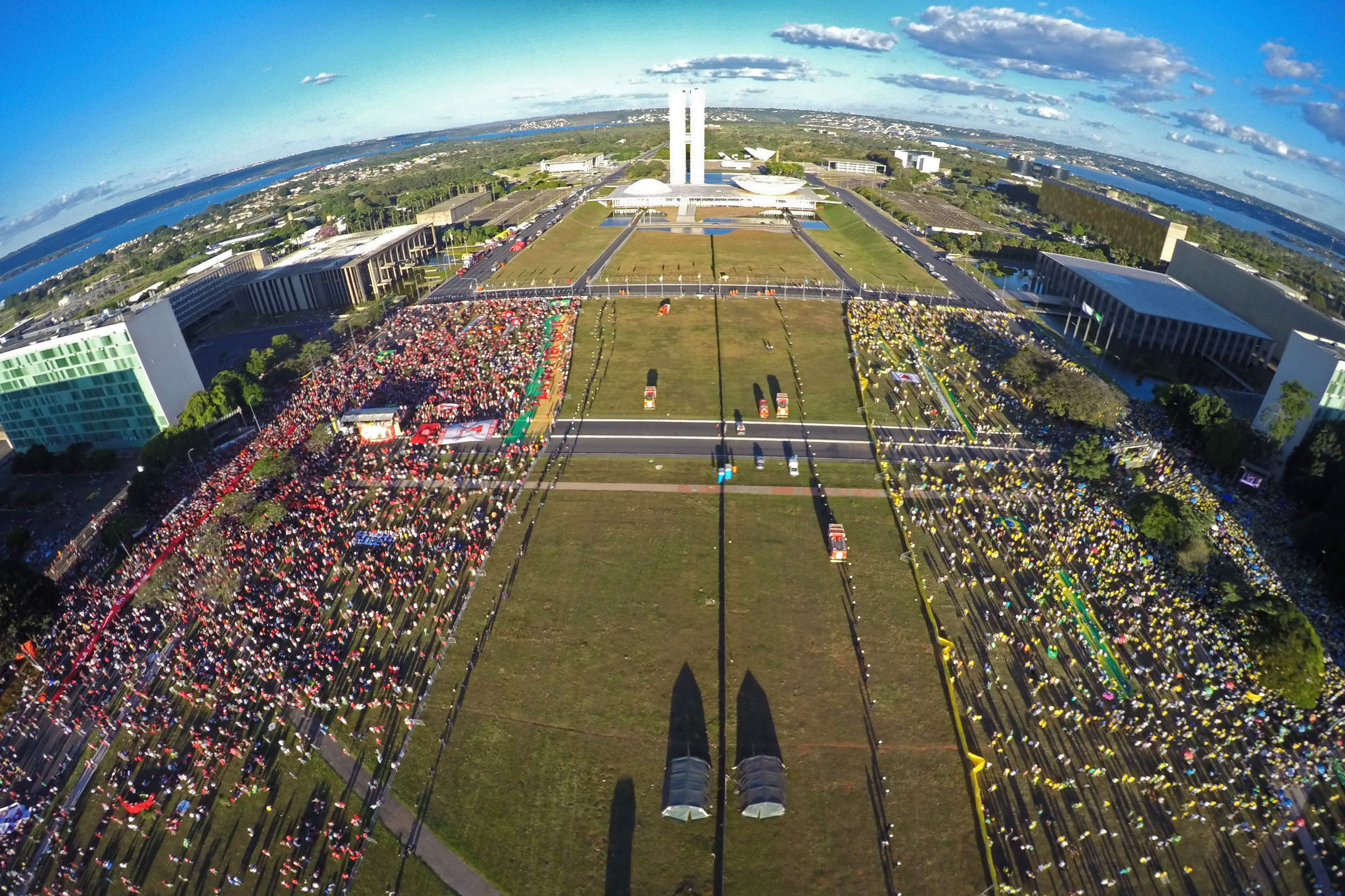
Pro- and anti-impeachment protesters of Dilma Rousseff occupy the Esplanade of Ministries in Brasília, 2016.

The peaceful transition of power from Cardoso to his main opposition leader, Luiz Inácio Lula da Silva (elected in 2002 and re-elected in 2006), was seen as proof that Brazil had achieved a long-sought political stability. However, sparked by discontent accumulated over decades from corruption, police brutality, inefficiencies of the political establishment and public service, numerous peaceful protests erupted in Brazil in the middle of the first term of Dilma Rousseff, who had succeeded Lula after winning election in 2010 and again in 2014 by narrow margins.

Rousseff was impeached by the Brazilian Congress in 2016, halfway into her second term and was replaced by Vice President Michel Temer. Large street protests for and against Rouseff took place during the impeachment process. The charges against her were fueled by political and economic crises along with evidence of involvement with politicians from all the primary political parties. In 2017, the Supreme Court requested the investigation of 71 Brazilian lawmakers and nine ministers of Temer's cabinet who were allegedly linked to the Petrobras corruption scandal. Temer was also accused of corruption.

In the fiercely contested 2018 elections, the ultraconservative candidate Jair Bolsonaro of the Social Liberal Party (PSL) was elected president, winning in the second round against Fernando Haddad, of the Workers Party (PT), with the support of 55.13% of the valid votes. In the early 2020s, Brazil became one of the hardest hit countries during the COVID-19 pandemic, receiving the second-highest death toll worldwide after the United States. In May 2021, Luiz Inácio Lula da Silva stated that he would run for a third term in the 2022 general election against Bolsonaro. In October 2022, Lula was in first place in the first round, with 48.43% of the support from the electorate, and he received 50.90% of the votes in the second round. On 8 January 2023, a week after Lula's inauguration, a mob of Bolsonaro's supporters attacked Brazil's federal government buildings in Brasília after several weeks of unrest.

In the 2026 general election, held on 4 October, Lula sought a fourth term against Flávio Bolsonaro, a senator for Rio de Janeiro and son of Jair Bolsonaro, who ran for the Liberal Party (PL). Bolsonaro finished first in the first round with 47.03% of valid votes to Lula's 45.16%, sending the contest to a runoff. In the runoff on 25 October, Lula won with 51.79% of valid votes (about 64.3 million) against 48.21% for Bolsonaro, a margin of roughly 4.4 million votes. The result gave Lula a fourth term as president. Bolsonaro rejected the outcome and called for it to be annulled, although his party acknowledged the result.

== Geography ==
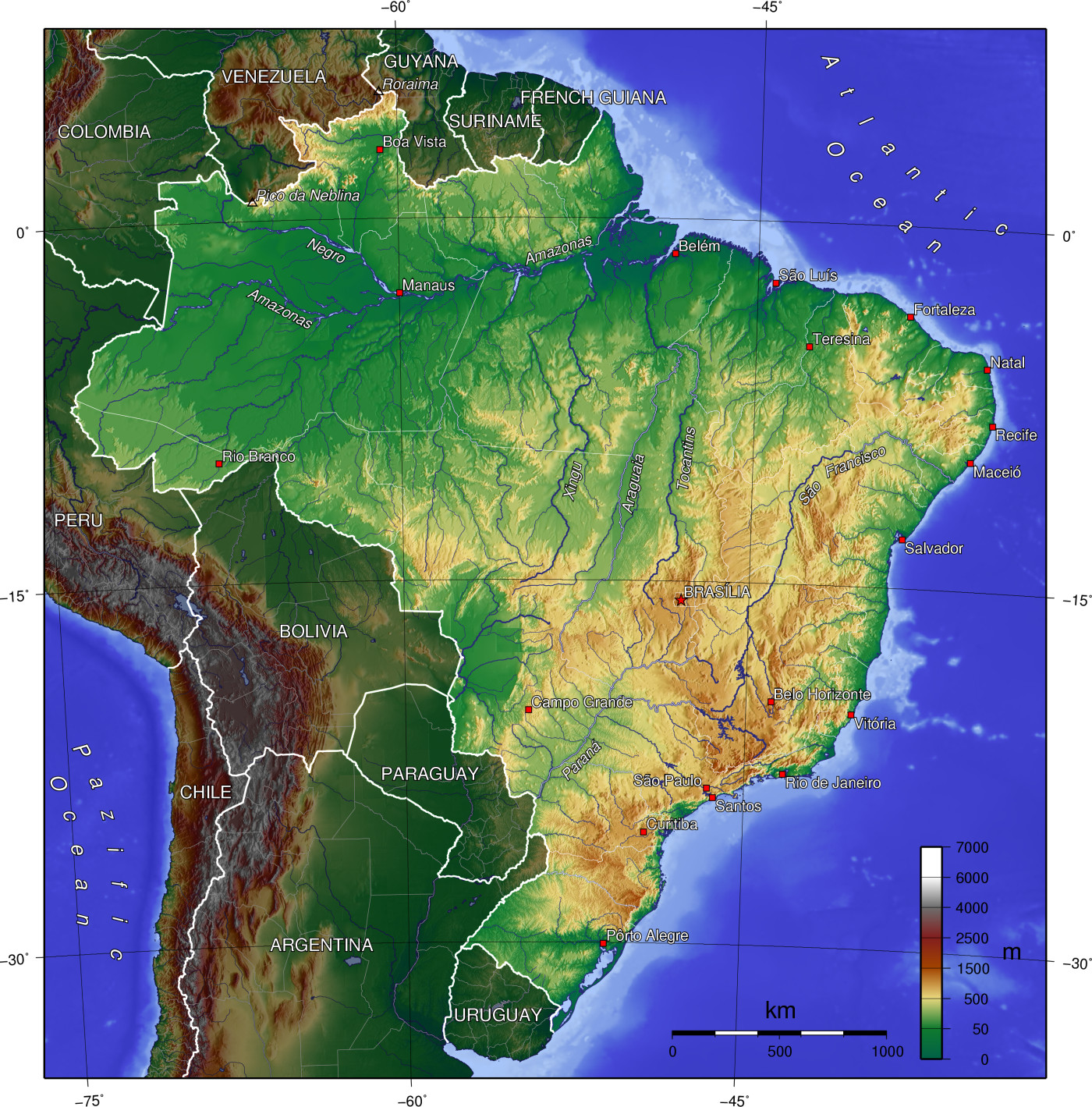
A topographic map of Brazil

Brazil occupies nearly half of the land area of South America (47.7%), including a large area along its eastern coast and much of the continent's interior. It borders Uruguay to the south; Argentina and Paraguay to the southwest; Bolivia and Peru to the west; Colombia to the northwest; and Venezuela, Guyana, Suriname, and France (French overseas region of French Guiana) to the north. It shares a border with every South American country except Ecuador and Chile.

The Brazilian territory also encompasses a number of oceanic archipelagos, such as Fernando de Noronha, Rocas Atoll, Saint Peter and Saint Paul Archipelago, and the islands of Trindade and Martim Vaz. Its size, relief, climate, and natural resources make Brazil geographically diverse. Including its Atlantic islands, Brazil lies between latitudes 6°N and 34°S, and longitudes 28° and 74°W.

Brazil is the fifth largest country in the world, and third largest in the Americas, with a total area of 8,515,767.049 km^{2} (3,287,956 sq mi), including 55,455 km^{2} (21,411 sq mi) of water. Brazil is the only country in the world that has the equator and the Tropic of Capricorn running through it. It spans four time zones; from UTC−5 comprising the state of Acre and the westernmost portion of Amazonas, to UTC−4 in the western states, to UTC−3 in the eastern states (the national time) and UTC−2 in the Atlantic islands.

=== Climate ===
Brazil map of Köppen climate classification zones

The climate of Brazil comprises a wide range of weather conditions across a large area and varied topography, but most of the country is tropical. According to the Köppen system, Brazil hosts six major climatic subtypes: desert, equatorial, tropical, semiarid, oceanic and subtropical. The different climatic conditions produce environments ranging from equatorial rainforests in the north and semiarid deserts in the northeast, to temperate coniferous forests in the south and tropical savannas in central Brazil.

In Brazil, forest cover is around 59% of the total land area, equivalent to 496,619,600 hectares (ha) of forest in 2020, down from 588,898,000 hectares (ha) in 1990. In 2020, naturally regenerating forest covered 485,396,000 hectares (ha) and planted forest covered 11,223,600 hectares (ha). Of the naturally regenerating forest, 44% was reported to be primary forest (consisting of native tree species with no clearly visible indications of human activity) and around 30% of the forest area was found within protected areas. For 2015, 56% of the forest area was reported to be under public ownership and 44% private ownership.

Many regions have starkly different microclimates. An equatorial climate characterizes much of northern Brazil. There is no real dry season, but there are some variations in the period of the year when most rain falls. Temperatures average 25 °C (77 °F), with more significant temperature variation between night and day than between seasons. Over central Brazil, rainfall is more seasonal, characteristic of a savanna climate. This region is as extensive as the Amazon basin but has a very different climate as it lies farther south at a higher altitude. In the interior northeast, seasonal rainfall is even more extreme. South of Bahia, near the coasts, and more southerly most of the state of São Paulo, the distribution of rainfall changes, with rain falling throughout the year. The south enjoys subtropical conditions, with cool winters and average annual temperatures not exceeding 18 °C (64.4 °F); winter frosts and snowfall are not rare in the highest areas.

The semiarid climatic region generally receives less than 800 millimeters (31.5 in) of rain, most of which generally falls in a period of three to five months of the year and occasionally less than this, creating long periods of drought. Brazil's 1877–78 Grande Seca (Great Drought), the worst in Brazil's history, caused approximately half a million deaths. A similarly devastating drought occurred in 1915. In 2024, for the first time, "a drought has covered all the way from the North to the country's Southeast". It is the strongest drought in Brazil since the beginning of measurement in the 1950s, covering almost 60% of the country's territory. The drought is linked to deforestation and climate change.

Since 1850, Brazil has cumulatively contributed an amount of CO_{2} placing it among the top greenhouse gas emitters in the world, mainly due to its land use and forestry practices.

Climate change in Brazil is causing higher temperatures and longer-lasting heatwaves, changing precipitation patterns, more intense wildfires and heightened fire risk. Brazil's hydropower, agriculture and urban water supplies will be affected. Brazil's rainforests, and the Amazon, are particularly at risk to climate change. At worst, large areas of the Amazon River basin could turn into savannah, with severe consequences for global climate and local livelihoods. Extreme weather events like droughts and flash floods are causing annual losses of around R$13 billion (US$2.6 billion), equivalent to 0.1% of the country's 2022 GDP. Climate impacts could exacerbate poverty.

Brazil's greenhouse gas emissions per person are higher than the global average, and Brazil is among the top 10 highest emitting countries. Greenhouse gas emissions by Brazil are over 4% of the annual world total. In 2026 the Brazilian government has launched a National Climate Change Plan which should cut greenhouse gas emissions by 59% - 67% by 2035, and make the country carbon neutral by 2050. Brazil hosted the 2025 United Nations Climate Change Conference, in which it launched the Global carbon market coalition immediately joined by 11 countries including Brazil, China, the European Union, United Kingdom. According to some calculations, a global carbon market can speed up emission reduction seven-fold.

=== Topography and hydrography ===
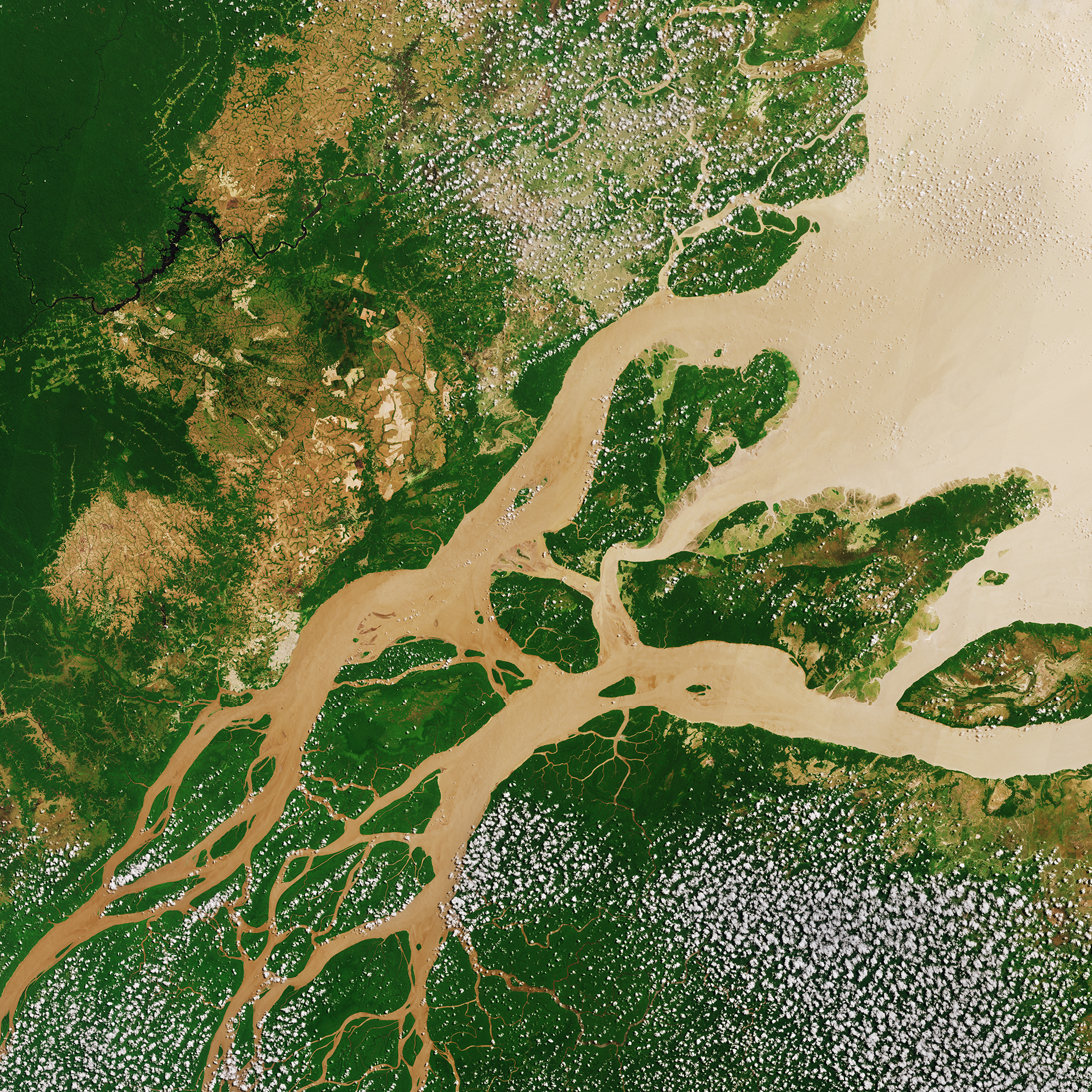
Satellite image of the Amazon Delta

Brazilian topography is diverse, encompassing hills, mountains, plains, highlands, and scrublands. Nearly half of its territory lies below 200 meters, and barely 7% is above 800 meters.

The main upland area occupies most of the southern half of the country. The northwestern parts of the plateau consist of broad, rolling terrain broken by low, rounded hills. The southeastern section is more rugged, with a complex mass of ridges and mountain ranges reaching elevations of up to 1,200 meters (3,900 ft). These ranges include the Mantiqueira and Espinhaço mountains and the Serra do Mar. In the north, the Guiana Highlands form a major drainage divide, separating rivers that flow south into the Amazon Basin from rivers that empty into the Orinoco River system, in Venezuela, to the north. The highest point in Brazil is the Pico da Neblina at 2,994 meters (9,823 ft), and the lowest is the Atlantic Ocean.

Brazil has a dense and complex system of rivers, one of the world's most extensive, with eight major drainage basins, all of which drain into the Atlantic. Major rivers include the Amazon (the world's largest in terms of water volume), the Paraná and its major tributary the Iguaçu (which includes the Iguazu Falls), the Negro, São Francisco, Xingu, Madeira and Tapajós rivers.

=== Biodiversity and conservation ===
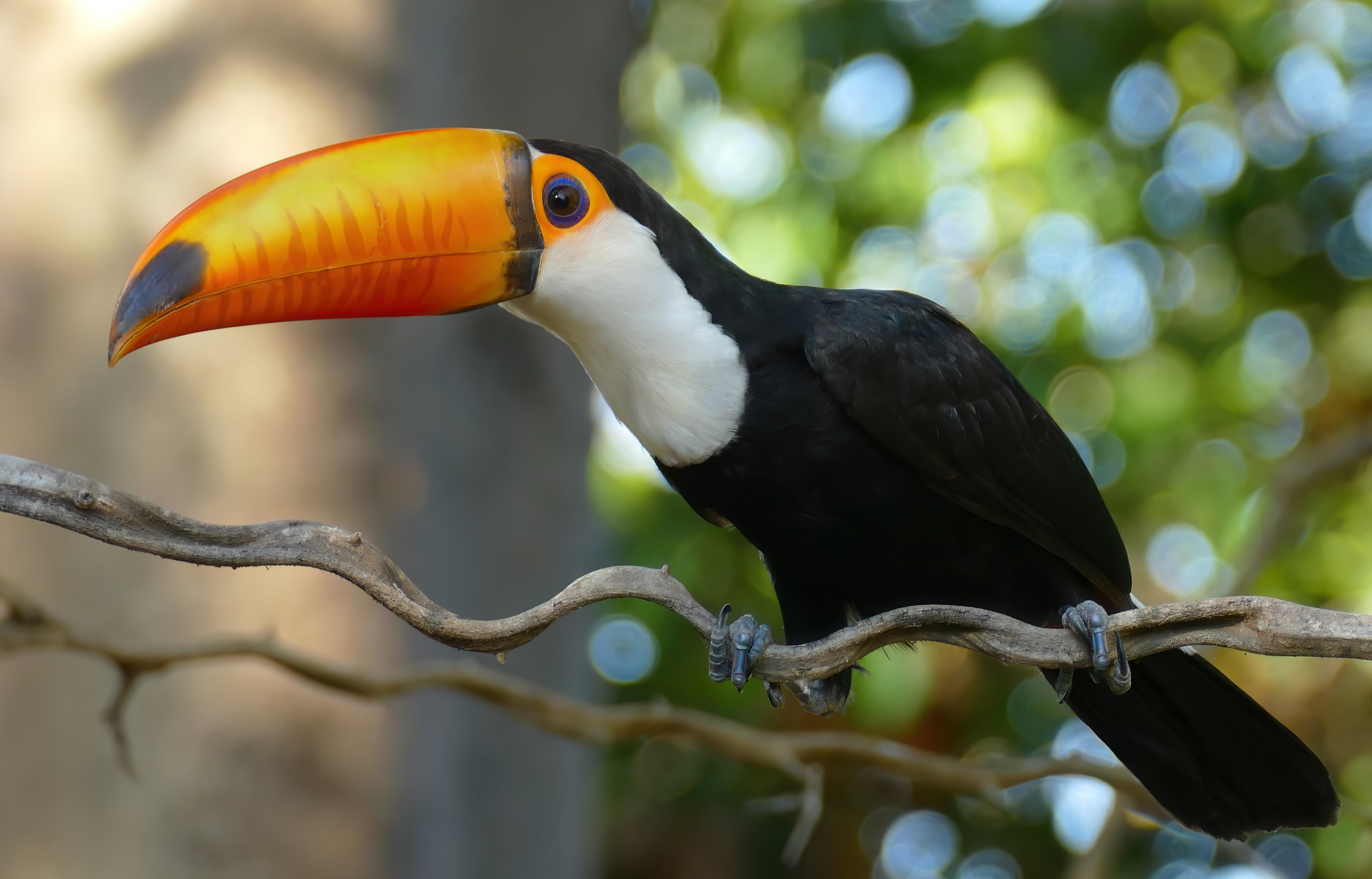
The toco toucan is an animal typical of the Brazilian savannas.

The wildlife of Brazil comprises all naturally occurring animals, plants, and fungi in the South American country. Home to 60% of the Amazon rainforest, which accounts for approximately one-tenth of all species in the world, Brazil is considered to have the greatest biodiversity of any country on the planet, containing over 70% of all animal and plant species catalogued. Brazil has the most known species of plants (55,000), freshwater fish (3,000) and mammals (over 689). It also ranks third on the list of countries with the most bird species (1,832) and second with the most reptile species (744). The number of fungal species is unknown but is large. Brazil is second only to Indonesia as the country with the most endemic species.

Brazil's large territory comprises different ecosystems, such as the Amazon rainforest, recognized as having the greatest biological diversity in the world, with the Atlantic Forest and the Cerrado sustaining the greatest biodiversity. In the south, the Araucaria moist forests grow under temperate conditions. The rich wildlife of Brazil reflects the variety of natural habitats. Scientists estimate that the total number of plant and animal species in Brazil could approach four million, mostly invertebrates. Larger mammals include carnivores pumas, jaguars, ocelots, rare bush dogs, and South American foxes, and herbivores peccaries, tapirs, anteaters, sloths, opossums and armadillos. Deer are plentiful in the south, and many species of New World monkeys are found in the northern rainforests.

Cumulatively, Brazil has the highest percentage of deforested and highly degraded rainforest of any Amazonia nation.

More than one-fifth of the Amazon rainforest in Brazil has been completely destroyed, and more than 70 mammals are endangered. The threat of extinction comes from several sources, including deforestation and poaching. Extinction is even more problematic in the Atlantic Forest, where nearly 93% of the forest has been cleared. Of the 202 endangered animals in Brazil, 171 are in the Atlantic Forest. The Amazon rainforest has been under direct threat of deforestation since the 1970s because of rapid economic and demographic expansion. Extensive legal and illegal logging destroy forests the size of a small country per year, and with it a diverse series of species through habitat destruction and habitat fragmentation. Since 1970, over 600,000 square kilometers (230,000 sq mi) of the Amazon rainforest have been cleared by logging.

In 2017, preserved native vegetation occupied 61% of the Brazilian territory. Agriculture occupied only 8% of the national territory and pastures 19.7%. For comparison, in 2019, although 43% of the entire European continent has forests, only 3% of the total forest area in Europe is of native forest. Brazil has a strong interest in conservation, as its agriculture sector directly depends on its forests.

== Government and politics ==
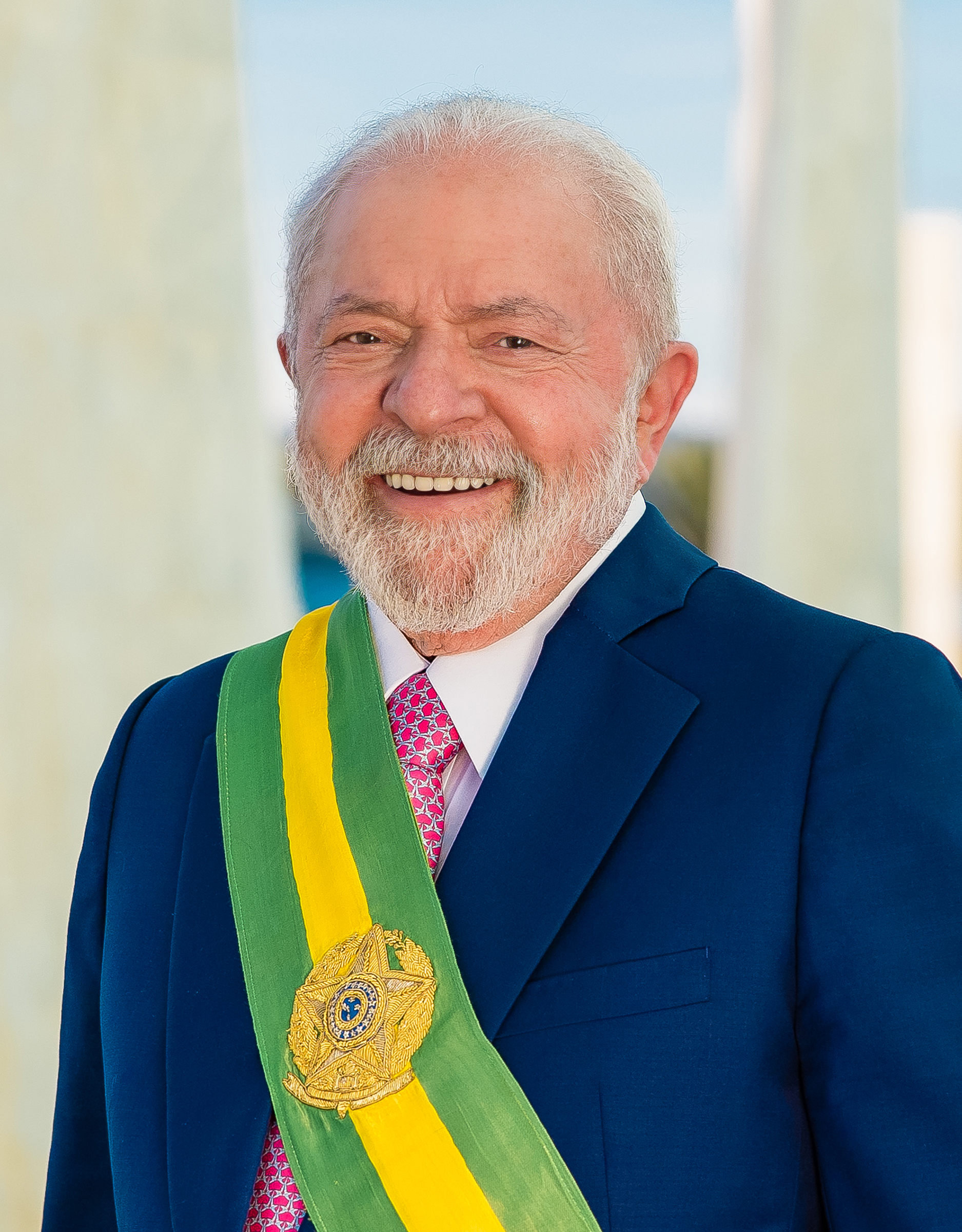
Luiz Inácio Lula da Silva
President

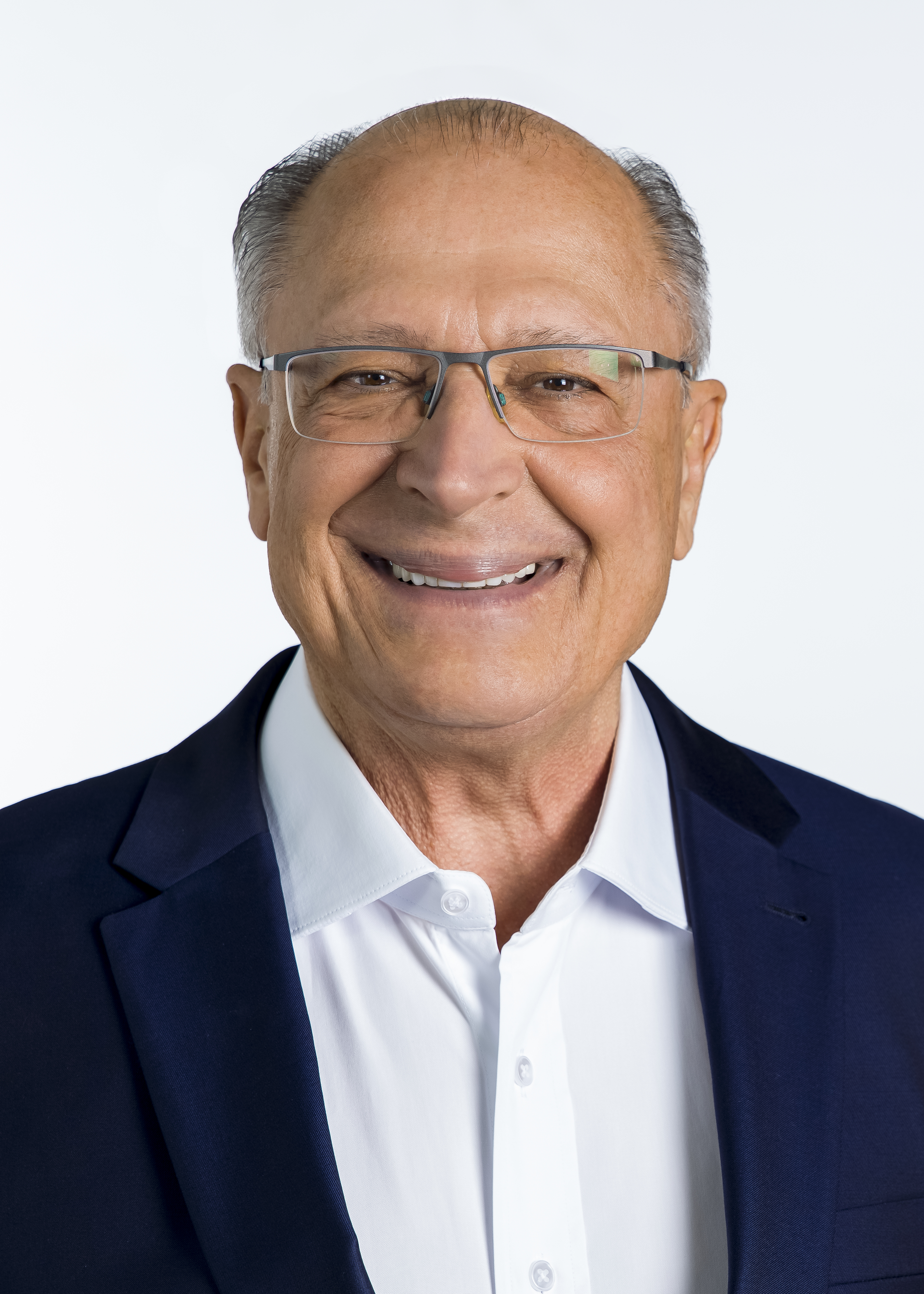
Geraldo Alckmin
Vice President

The form of government is a democratic federative republic, with a presidential system, as decided in a 1993 referendum. The president is both head of state and head of government of the Union and is elected for a four-year term, with the possibility of re-election for a second successive term. The current president is Luiz Inácio Lula da Silva. The president appoints the Ministers of State, who form the cabinet and assist in government.

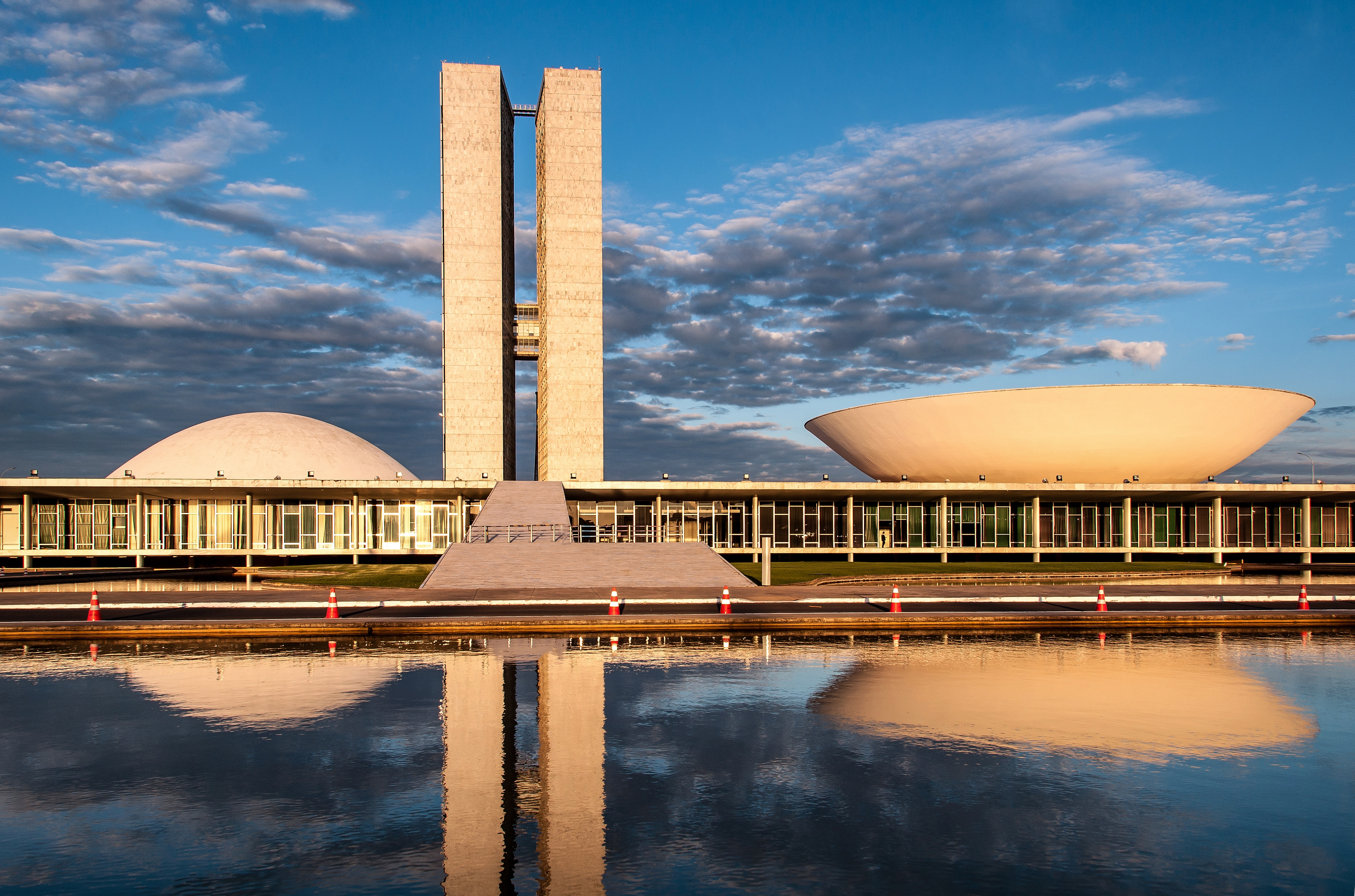
National Congress, seat of the legislative branch

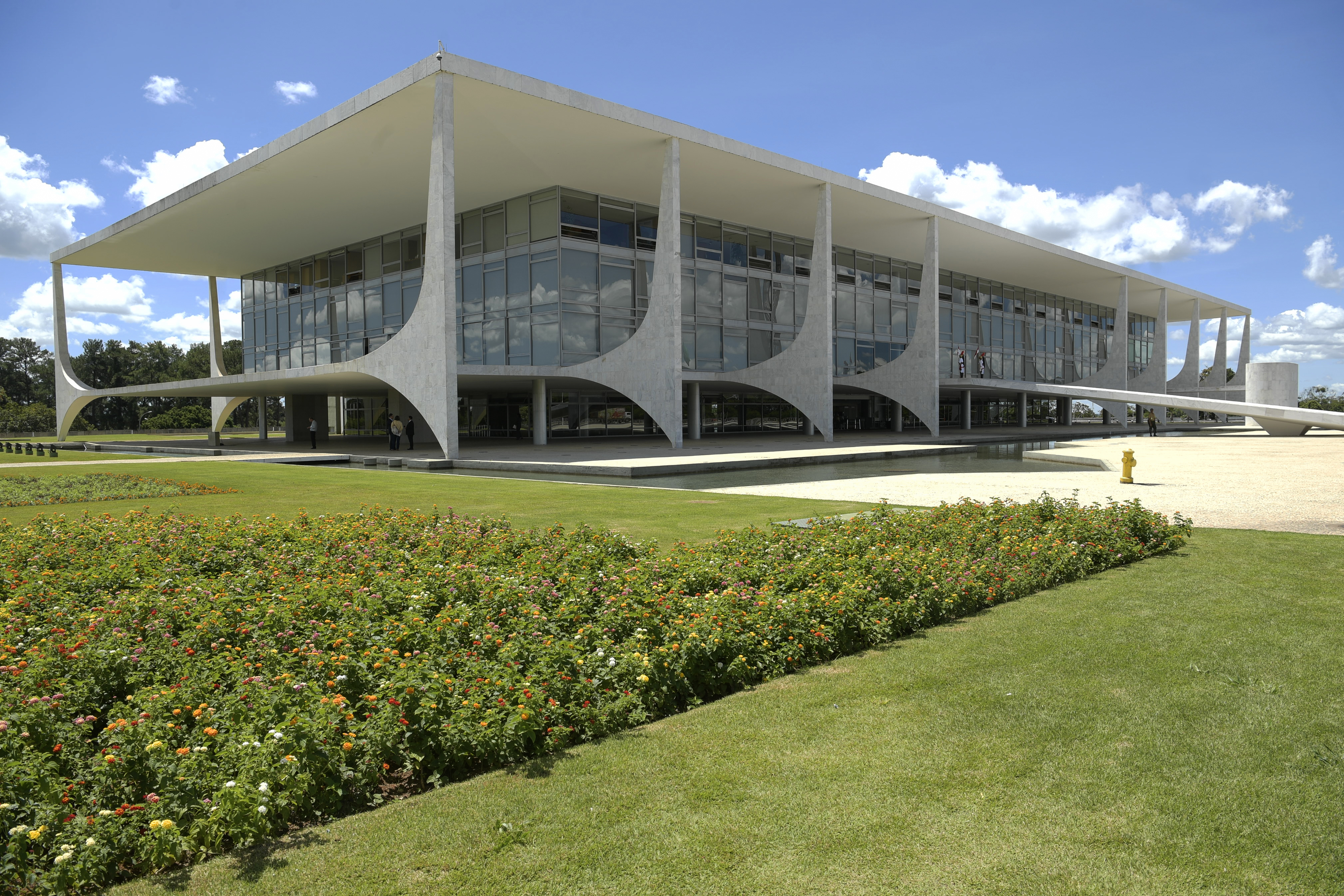
Palácio do Planalto, the official workplace of the President of Brazil

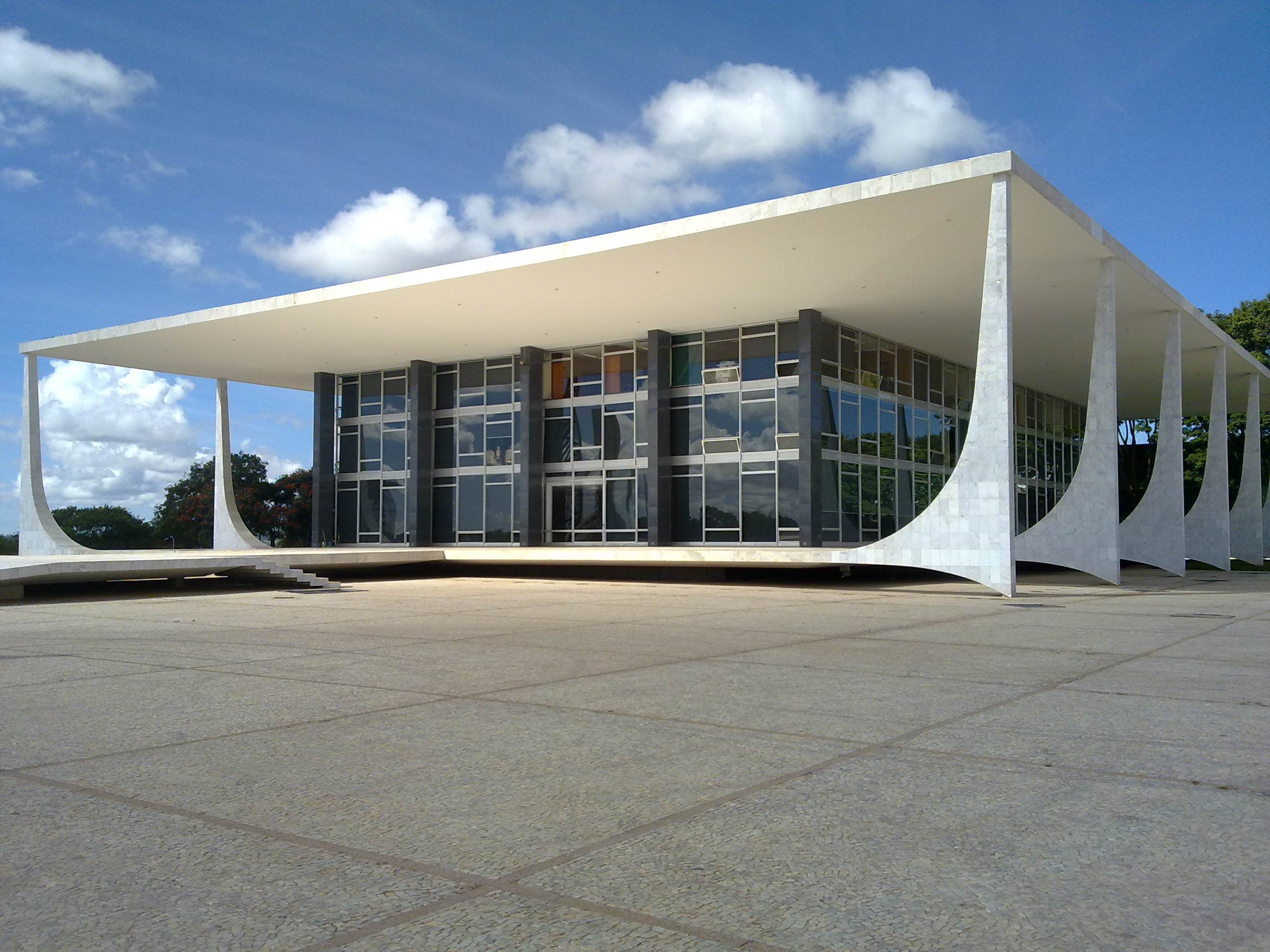
The Supreme Federal Court, Brazil's highest court

Legislative houses in each political entity are the main source of law in Brazil. The National Congress is the federation's bicameral legislature, consisting of the Chamber of Deputies and the Federal Senate. The Senate represents the 26 states and the Federal District. Each state and the Federal District has a representation of three senators, who are elected by popular ballot for a term of eight years. The Chamber of Deputies represents the people of each state, and its members are elected for a four-year term by a system of proportional representation. Judiciary authorities exercise jurisdictional duties almost exclusively.

According to International IDEA's Global State of Democracy (GSoD) Indices and Democracy Tracker, Brazil performs in the mid to high range on overall democratic measures, with particular strengths in inclusive suffrage, freedom of religion, and civic engagement. In 2021, the Economist Intelligence Unit's Democracy Index categorized Brazil as a "flawed democracy", ranking 46th in the report, and Freedom House classified it as a free country at Freedom in the World report. According to the Regimes of the World classification Brazil was an electoral democracy in year 2024.

The political-administrative organization of the Federative Republic of Brazil comprises the Union, the states, the Federal District, and the municipalities. The Union, the states, the Federal District, and the municipalities, are the "spheres of government". The federation is set on five fundamental principles: sovereignty, citizenship, dignity of human beings, the social values of labor and freedom of enterprise, and political pluralism.

The classic tripartite branches of government (executive, legislative and judicial under a checks and balances system) are formally established by the constitution. The executive and legislative are organized independently in all three spheres of government, while the judiciary is organized only at the federal and state and Federal District spheres. All members of the executive and legislative branches are directly elected.

For most of its democratic history, Brazil has had a multi-party system, with proportional representation. Voting is compulsory for the literate between 18 and 70 years old and optional for illiterates and those between 16 and 18 or beyond 70. The country has around 30 registered political parties. Twenty political parties are represented in Congress. It is common for politicians to switch parties, and thus the proportion of congressional seats held by particular parties changes regularly.

=== Law ===
Brazilian law is based on the civil law legal system and civil law concepts prevail over common law practice. Most of Brazilian law is codified, although non-codified statutes also represent a substantial part, playing a complementary role. While court decisions historically served primarily as interpretive guidelines, modern legal reforms have established binding judicial precedents across higher courts to ensure legal predictability. Doctrinal works and the works of academic jurists have a strong influence on law creation and in law cases. Judges and other judicial officials are appointed after passing entry exams.

The legal system is based on the Federal Constitution, promulgated on 5 October 1988, and the fundamental law of Brazil. All other legislation and court decisions must conform to its rules. As of July 2022, there have been 124 amendments. The highest court is the Supreme Federal Court. States have their own constitutions, which must not contradict the Federal Constitution. Municipalities and the Federal District have "organic laws" (leis orgânicas), which act in a similar way to constitutions. Legislative entities are the main source of statutes, although in certain matters judiciary and executive bodies may enact legal norms. Jurisdiction is administered by the judiciary entities, although in rare situations the Federal Constitution allows the Federal Senate to pass on legal judgments. There are also specialized military, labor and electoral courts.

=== Political subdivisions ===
Brazil is a federation composed of 26 states, one federal district, and the 5,571 municipalities. States have autonomous administrations, collect their own taxes and receive a share of taxes collected by the Federal government. They have a governor and a unicameral legislative body elected directly by their voters. They also have independent Courts of Law for common justice. States have the ability to create their own laws and establish their own constitutions but criminal and civil laws can be voted by only the federal bicameral Congress and are uniform throughout the country.

Municipalities, as the states, have autonomous administrations, collect their own taxes and receive a share of taxes collected by the federal and state government. Each has an elected mayor and legislative body, but no separate Court of Law. Indeed, a Court of Law organized by the state can encompass many municipalities in a single justice administrative division called comarca.

Brazil's constitution also provides for the creation of federal territories, which are administrative divisions directly controlled by the federal government. However, there are currently no federal territories in the country, as the 1988 constitution abolished the last three: Amapá and Roraima (which gained statehood) and Fernando de Noronha, which became a state district of Pernambuco.

=== Foreign relations ===
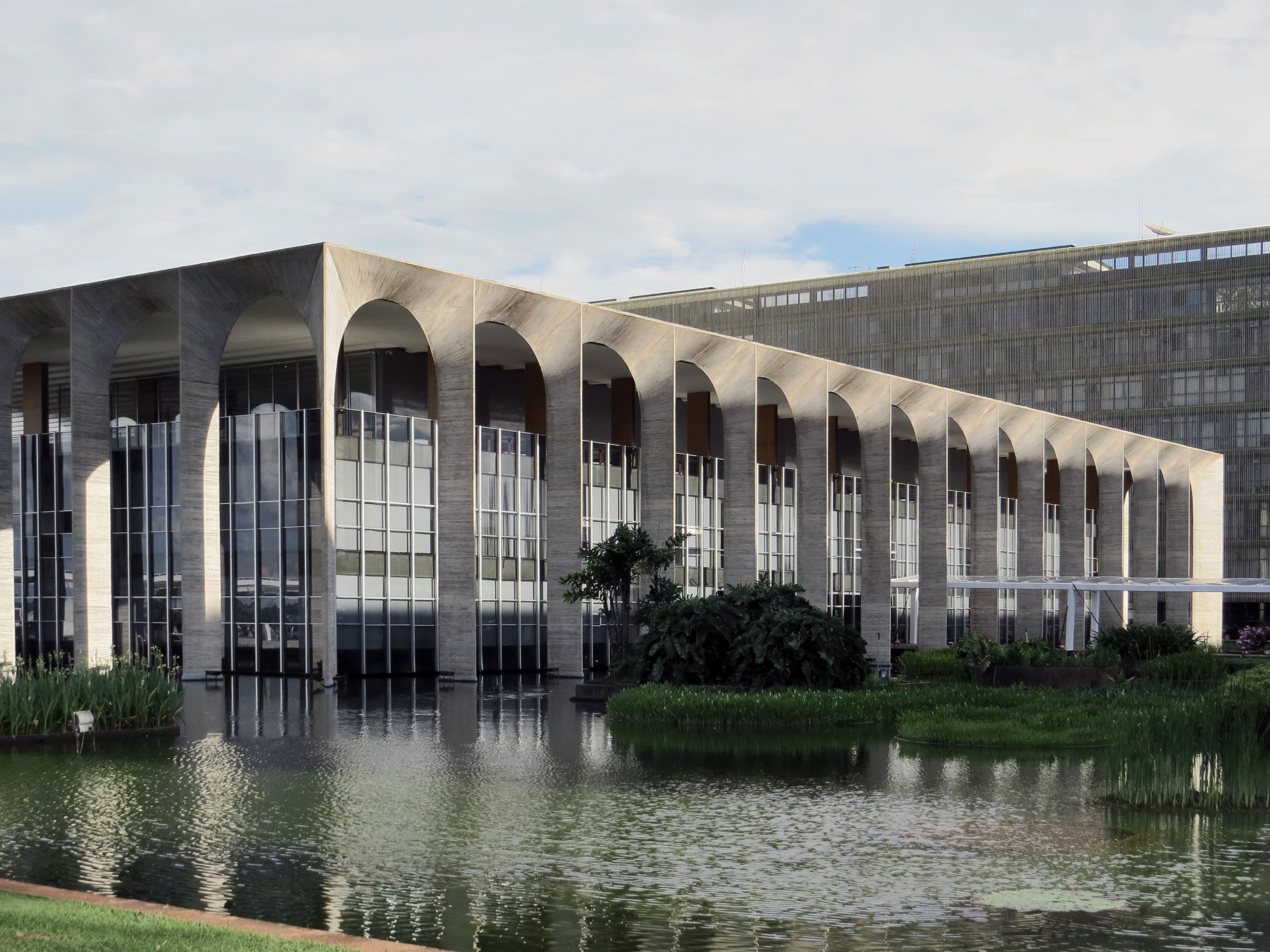
Itamaraty Palace, the seat of the Ministry of Foreign Affairs

Brazil's international relations are based on Article 4 of the Federal Constitution, which establishes non-intervention, self-determination, international cooperation and the peaceful settlement of conflicts as the guiding principles of Brazil's relationship with other countries and multilateral organizations. According to the constitution, the president has ultimate authority over foreign policy, while Congress is tasked with reviewing and considering all diplomatic nominations and international treaties, as well as legislation relating to Brazilian foreign policy.

Brazil's foreign policy is a by-product of the country's position as a regional power in Latin America, a leader among developing countries, and an emerging world power. Brazilian foreign policy has generally been based on the principles of multilateralism, peaceful dispute settlement, and non-intervention in the affairs of other countries. Brazil is a founding member state of the Community of Portuguese Language Countries (CPLP), also known as the Lusophone Commonwealth, an international organization and political association of Lusophone nations.

An increasingly well-developed tool of Brazil's foreign policy is providing aid as a donor to other developing countries. Brazil does not just use its growing economic strength to provide financial aid, but it also provides high levels of expertise and most importantly of all, a quiet non-confrontational diplomacy to improve governance levels. Total aid is estimated to be around $1 billion per year. In addition, Brazil already managed a peacekeeping mission in Haiti ($350 million) and makes in-kind contributions to the World Food Programme ($300 million). The scale of this aid places it on par with China and India. The Brazilian South-South aid has been described as a "global model in waiting".

=== Military ===
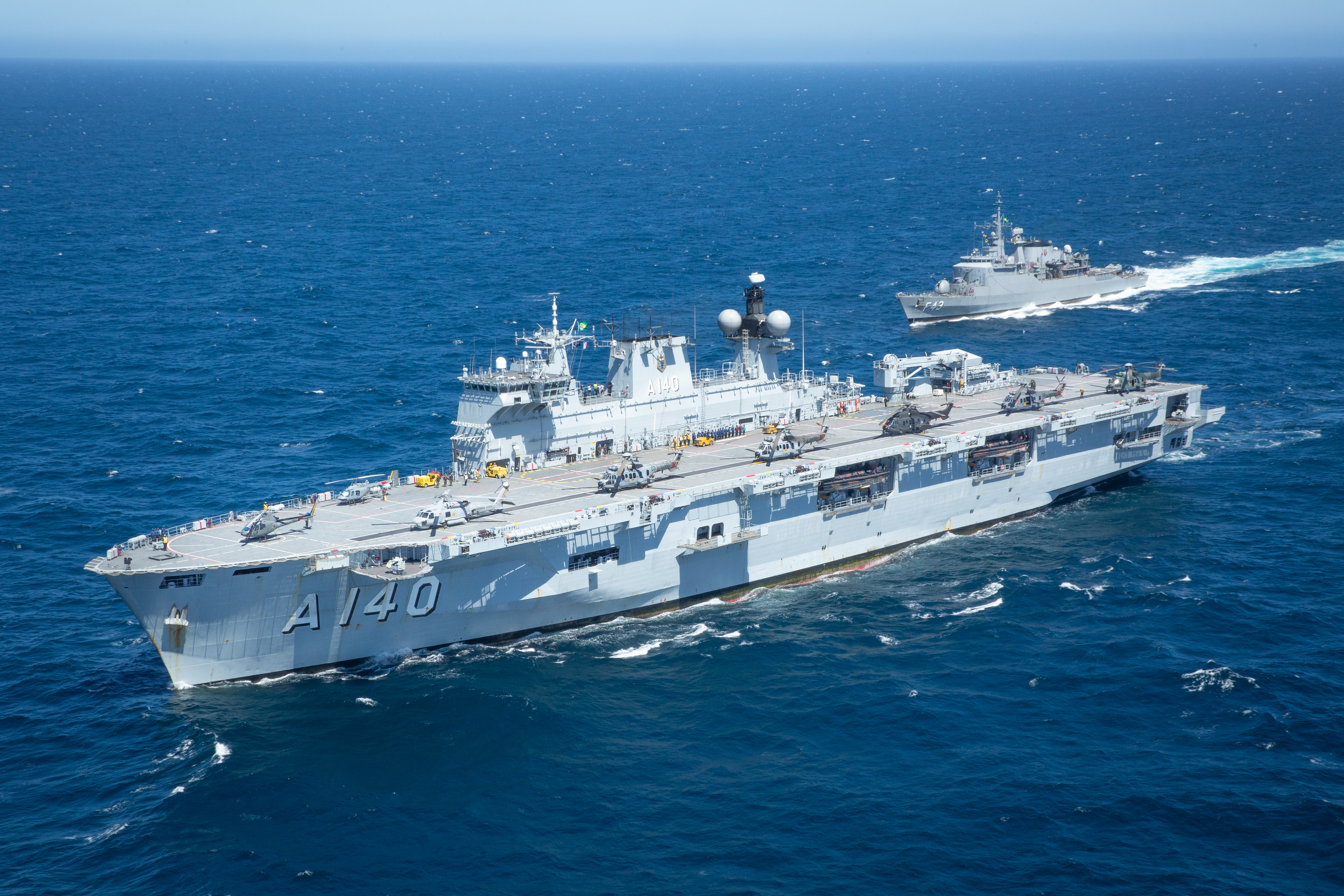
Brazilian Navy's flagship PHM Atlântico and frigate Liberal (F-43) (background)

The armed forces of Brazil are the largest in Latin America by active personnel and the largest in terms of military equipment. It consists of the Brazilian Army (including the Army Aviation Command), the Brazilian Navy (including the Marine Corps and Naval Aviation) and the Brazilian Air Force. Brazil's conscription policy gives it one of the world's largest military forces, estimated at more than 1.6 million reservists annually. The Air Force is the largest in Latin America and has about 700 crewed aircraft in service and effective about 67,000 personnel.

Numbering close to 236,000 active personnel, the Brazilian Army has the largest number of armored vehicles in South America, including armored transports and tanks. The states' Military Police and the Military Firefighters Corps are designated as auxiliary forces of the army by the constitution, but are under the control of each state's governor.

Brazil's navy once operated some of the most powerful warships in the world with the two Minas Geraes-class dreadnoughts, sparking a naval arms race between Argentina, Brazil, and Chile. Today, it is a green water force and has a group of specialized elite in retaking ships and naval facilities, GRUMEC, unit specially trained to protect Brazilian oil platforms along its coast. As of 2022, it is the only navy in Latin America that operates a helicopter carrier, NAM Atlântico and one of twelve navies in the world to operate or have one under construction.

=== Law enforcement and crime ===
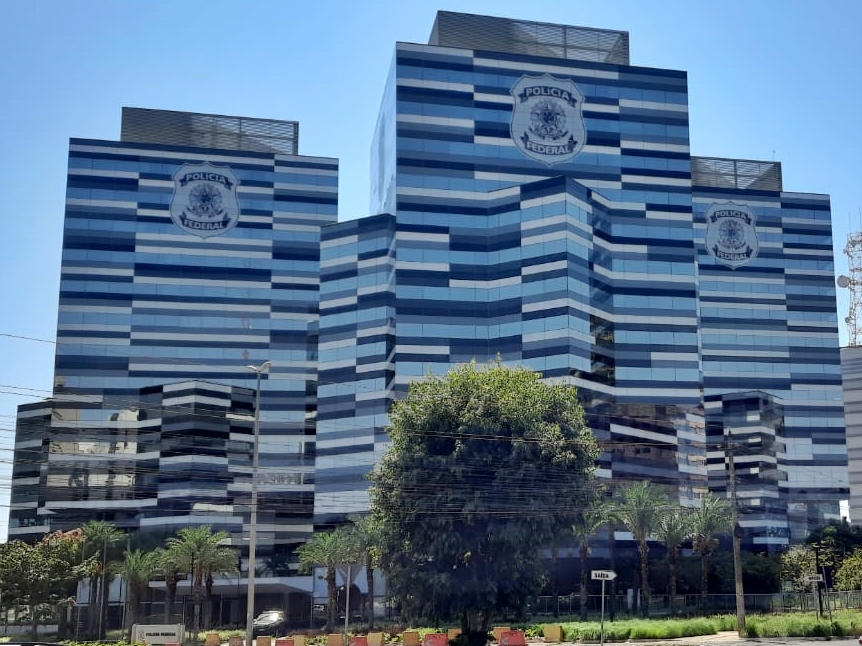
Headquarters of the Federal Police of Brazil in Brasília

In Brazil, the constitution establishes six different police agencies for law enforcement: Federal Police Department, Federal Highway Police, Federal Railroad Police, Federal, District and State Penal Police (included by the Constitutional Amendment No. 104, of 2019), Military Police and Civil Police. Of these, the former three are affiliated with federal authorities, the latter two are subordinate to state governments and the Penal Police can be subordinated to the federal or state/district government. All police forces are overseen by the executive branch of the federal or state governments. The National Public Security Force also can act in public disorder situations arising anywhere in the country.

The country has high levels of violent crime, such as gun violence and homicides. In 2022, the United Nations Office on Drugs and Crime (UNODC) estimated an intentional homicide rate of 21.1 per 100,000 inhabitants. The number considered acceptable by the World Health Organization (WHO) is about 10 homicides per 100,000 inhabitants. In 2025, Brazil recorded 34,086 homicides, down from 38,374 in 2024, and from a record 63,880 in 2017. Homicide rates vary regionally. While in São Paulo the homicide rate registered in 2025 was 5.4 per 100,000 inhabitants, in Ceará it was 32.6 per 100,000 inhabitants. The national homicide rate for 2025 was 16 per 100,000 inhabitants, the lowest in over a decade.

Brazil also has high levels of incarceration. It had the third largest prison population in the world of approximately 909,067 prisoners in 2024, which put it only behind the United States (1,808,100) and China (1,690,000). The high number of prisoners eventually overloaded the Brazilian prison system, leading to a shortfall of about 200,000 accommodations.

=== Human rights ===
Human rights in Brazil include the right to life and freedom of speech; and condemnation of slavery and torture. The nation ratified the American Convention on Human Rights. The 2017 Freedom in the World report by Freedom House gives Brazil a score of "2" for both political rights and civil liberties; "1" represents the most free, and "7", the least. According to UNESCO, "Brazil promotes a vast array of actions for the advancement and defense of human rights, even though it faces enormous social and economic inequalities". Same-sex couples in Brazil have held nationwide marriage rights since May 2013.

== Economy ==
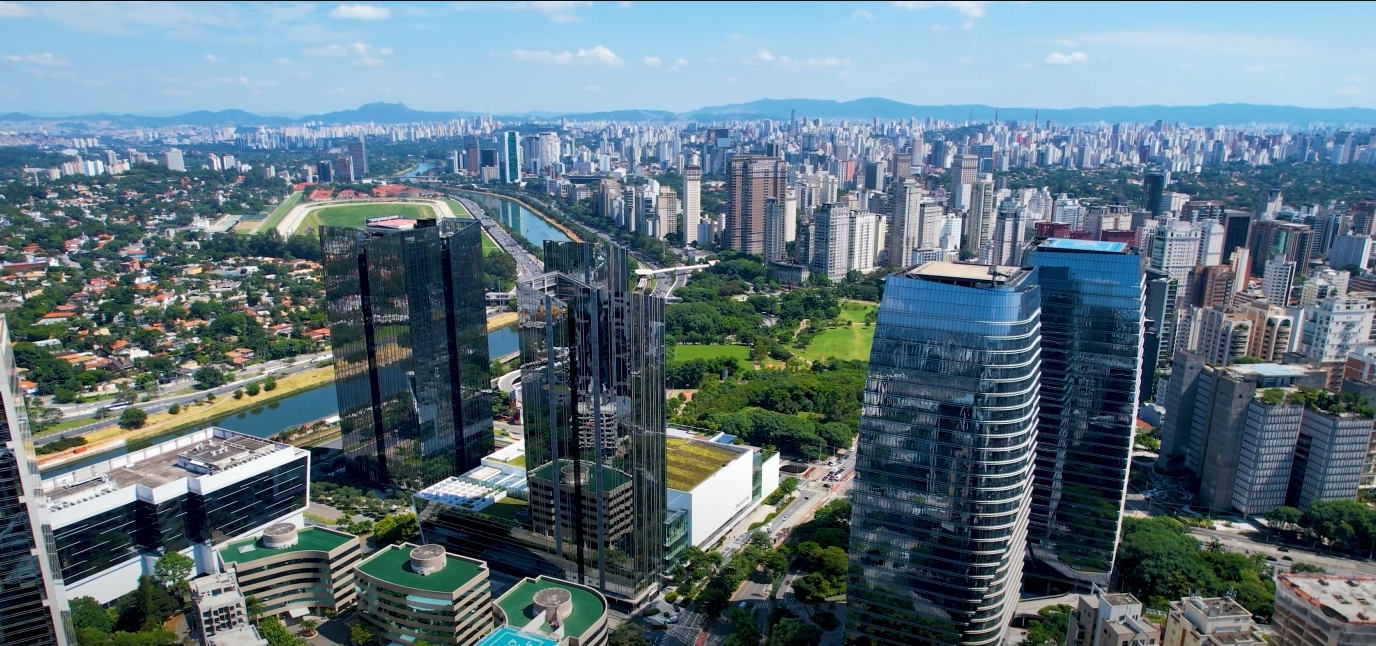
São Paulo is considered the main financial center of Brazil.

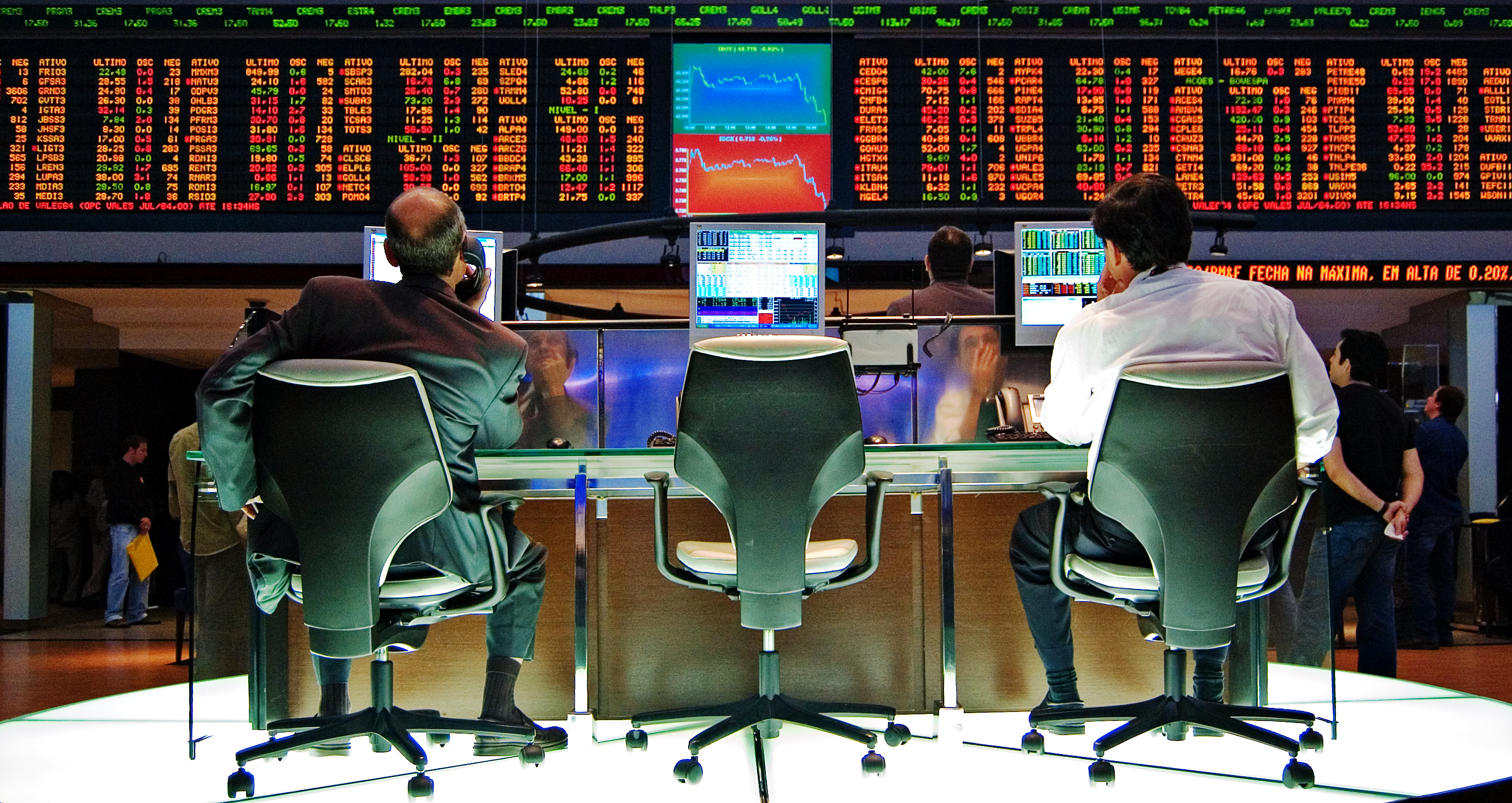
B3, the largest stock exchange of Latin America by market capitalization

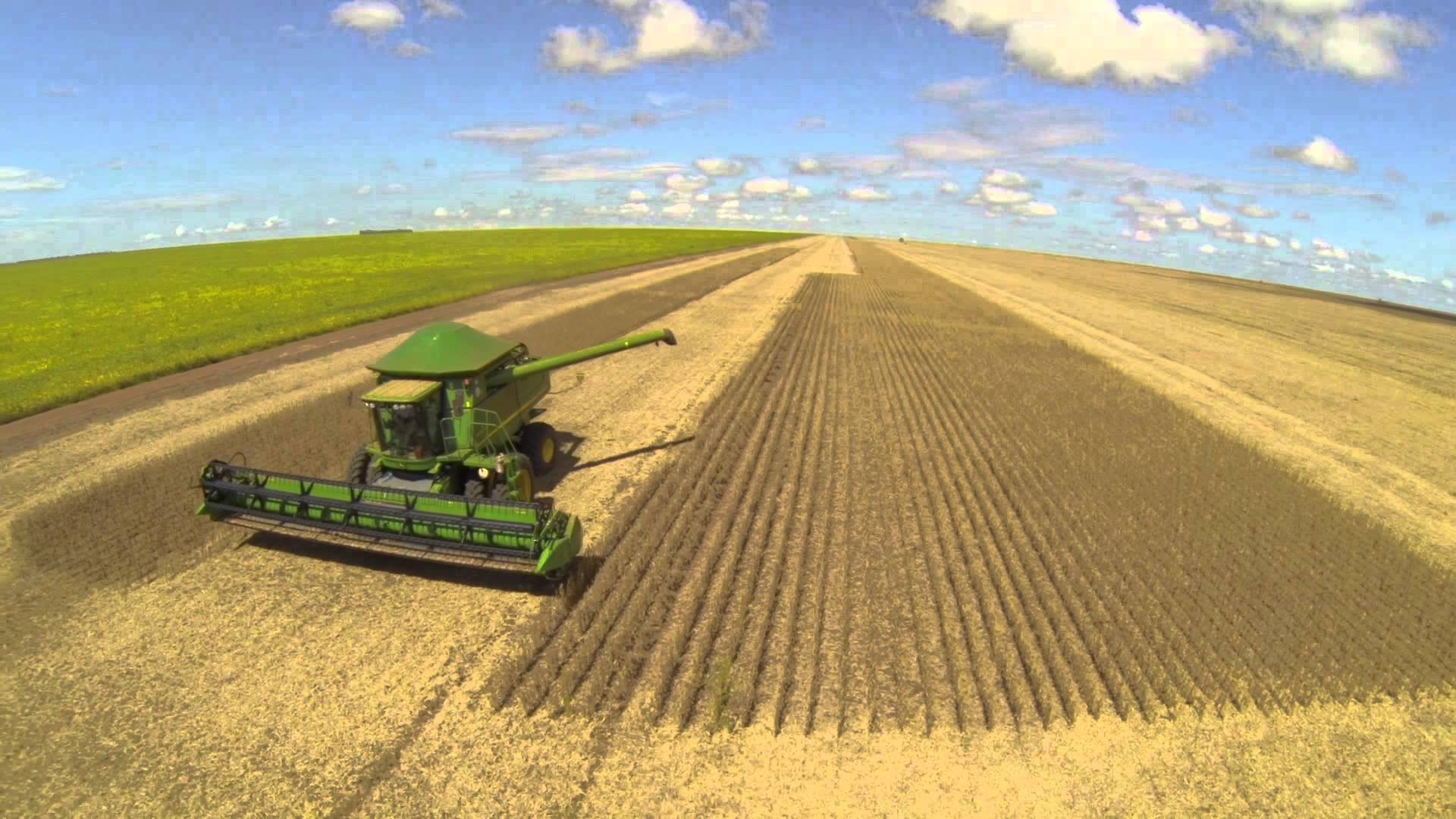
Soybean crop in Tangará da Serra, Mato Grosso

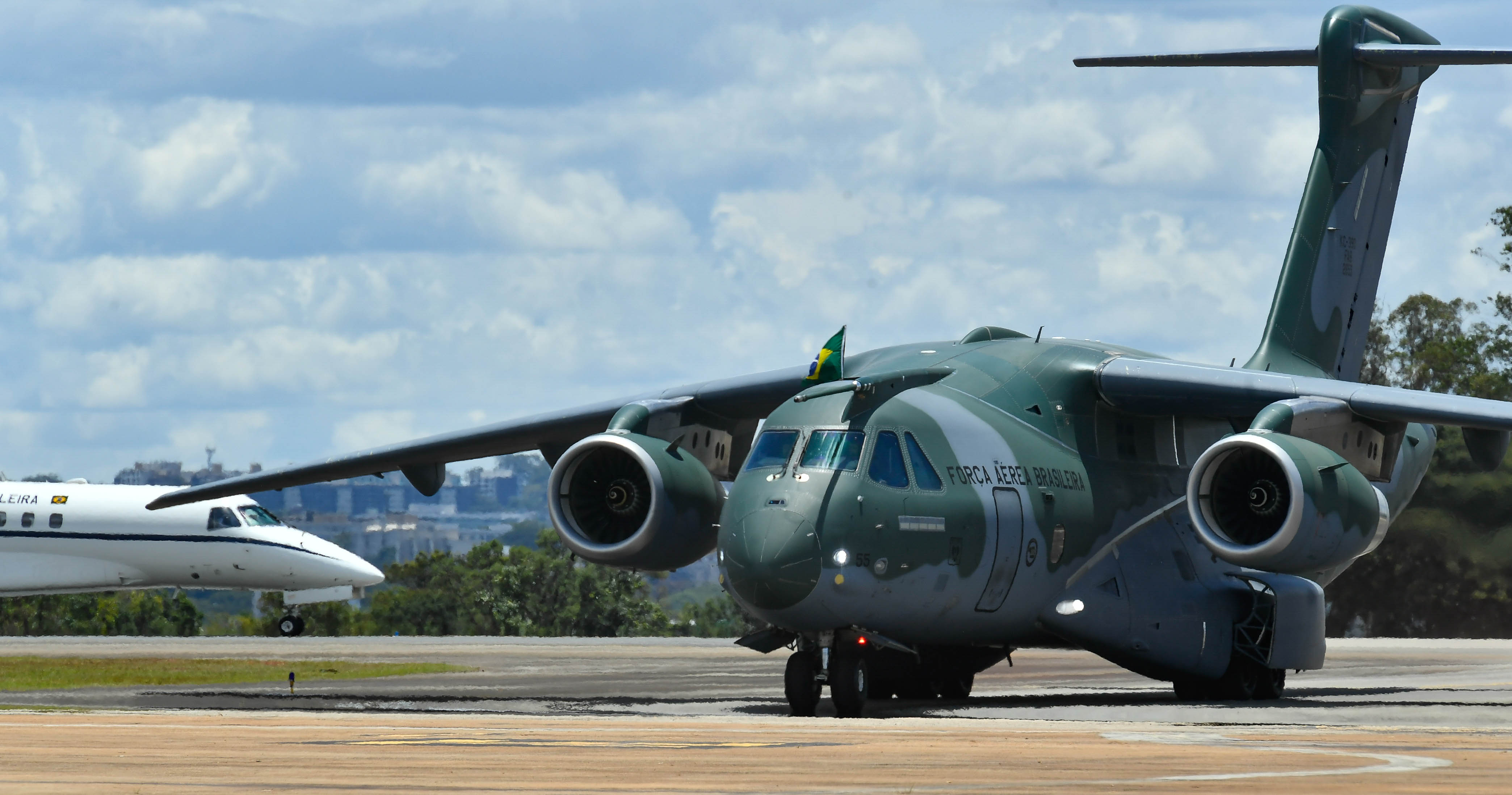
The C-390, developed by Embraer, the third largest producer of civil aircraft, after Boeing and Airbus

Brazil is a developing country with an upper-middle income mixed market economy that is rich in natural resources. It has the largest national economy in Latin America, the tenth largest economy in the world by nominal GDP, and the eighth largest by PPP. After rapid growth in preceding decades, Brazil entered a recession in 2014 amid a political corruption scandal and nationwide protests; in 2024, the economy began showing consistent significant growth. Brazil has a labor force of roughly 100 million, which is the world's fifth largest. Its foreign exchange reserves are the tenth-highest in the world. The B3 in São Paulo is the largest stock exchange of Latin America by market capitalization. Roughly one-fifth of Brazilians live in poverty: about 3% of the total population lives at $3.00 a day, while about 21% live at $8.30 a day. Brazil's economy suffers from endemic corruption and high income inequality. The Brazilian real is the national currency.

Brazil's diversified economy includes agriculture, industry and a wide range of services. The large service sector accounts for about 72.7% of total GDP, followed by the industrial sector (20.7%), while the agriculture sector is by far the smallest, making up 6.6% of total GDP.

Brazil is one of the largest producers of various agricultural commodities, and also has a large cooperative sector that provides 50% of the food in the country. It has been the world's largest producer of coffee for the last 150 years and is the world's largest producer of sugarcane, soy, coffee and oranges; is one of the top five producers of maize, cotton, lemon, tobacco, pineapple, banana, beans, coconut, watermelon and papaya; and is one of the top 10 world producers of cocoa, cashew, mango, rice, tomato, sorghum, tangerine, avocado, persimmon, and guava, among others. Regarding livestock, it is one of the five largest producers of chicken meat, beef, pork and cow's milk in the world.

In the mining sector, Brazil is among the largest producers of iron ore, copper, gold, bauxite, manganese, tin, niobium, and nickel. In terms of precious stones, Brazil is the world's largest producer of amethyst, topaz, agate and one of the main producers of tourmaline, emerald, aquamarine, garnet and opal. The country is a major exporter of soy, iron ore, pulp (cellulose), maize, beef, chicken meat, soybean meal, sugar, coffee, tobacco, cotton, orange juice, footwear, airplanes, cars, vehicle parts, gold, ethanol and semi-finished iron, among other products.

Brazil is the world's 24th-largest exporter and 26th-largest importer as of 2021. China is its largest trading partner, accounting for 32% of the total trade. Other large trading partners include the United States, Argentina, the Netherlands and Canada. Its automotive industry is the eighth-largest in the world. In the food industry, Brazil was the second-largest exporter of processed foods in the world in 2019. The country was the second-largest producer of pulp in the world and the eighth-largest producer of paper in 2016. In the footwear industry, Brazil was the fourth-largest producer in 2019. It was also the ninth-largest producer of steel in the world. In 2018, the chemical industry of Brazil was the eighth-largest in the world. Although it was among the five largest world producers in 2013, Brazil's textile industry is very little integrated into world trade.

The tertiary sector (trade and services) represented 75.8% of the country's GDP in 2018, according to the IBGE. The service sector was responsible for 60% of GDP and trade for 13%. It covers commerce, transport, education, social and health services, research and development, sports activities, etc. Micro and small businesses represent 30% of the country's GDP. In the commercial sector they represent 53% of the GDP within the activities of the sector.

=== Tourism ===
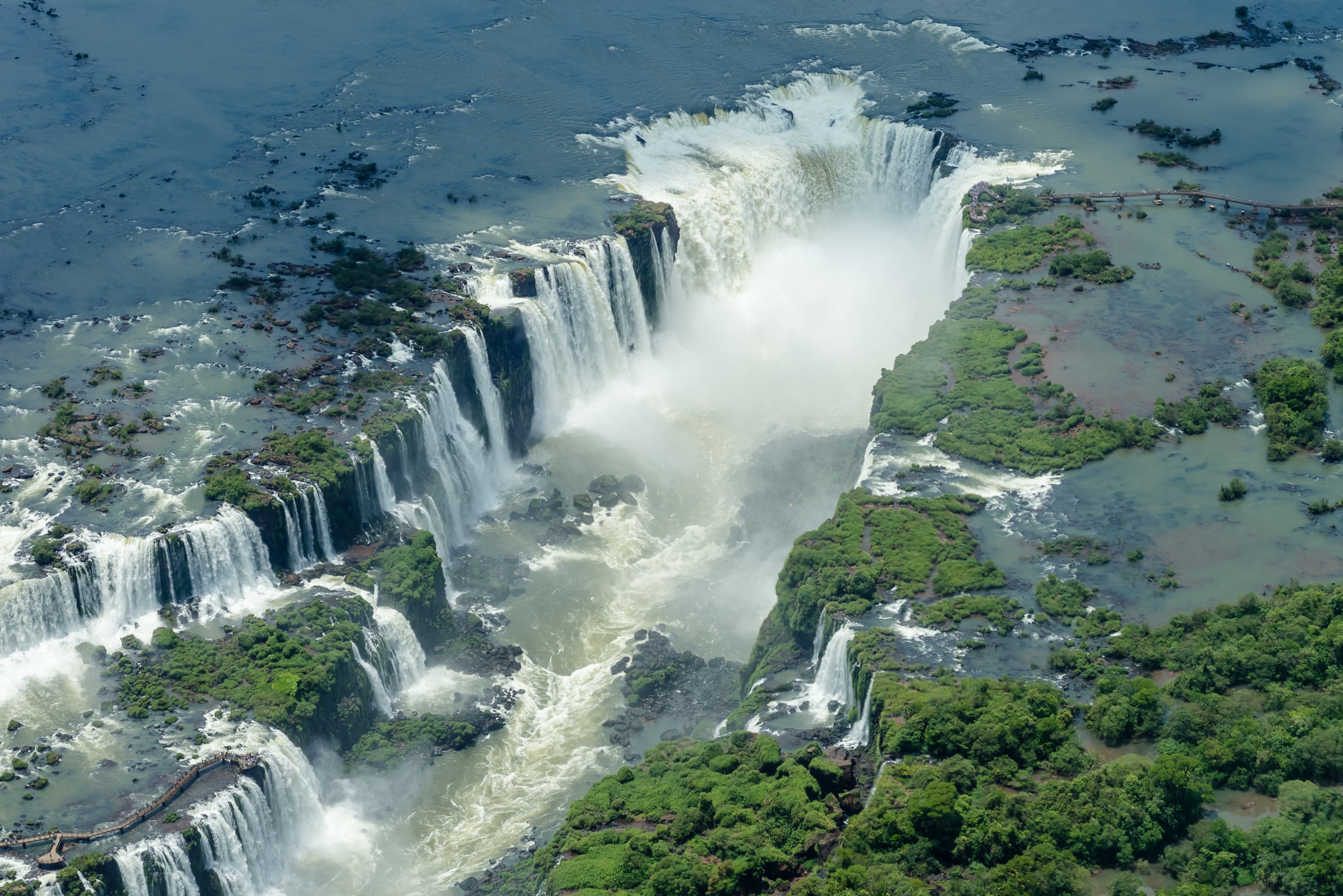
Iguaçu National Park in Paraná

Tourism in Brazil is a growing sector and key to the economies of several regions of the country. The country had 6.36 million visitors in 2015, ranking in terms of the international tourist arrivals as the main destination in South America and second in Latin America after Mexico. Revenues from international tourists reached US$6 billion in 2010, showing a recovery from the 2008–2009 economic crisis. Historical records of 5.4 million visitors and US$6.8 billion in receipts were reached in 2011. In the list of world tourist destinations, in 2018, Brazil was the 48th most visited country, with 6.6 million tourists (and revenues of 5.9 billion dollars).

Natural areas are its most popular tourism product, a combination of ecotourism with leisure and recreation, mainly sun and beach, and adventure travel, as well as cultural tourism. Among the most popular destinations are the Amazon Rainforest, beaches and dunes in the Northeast Region, the Pantanal in the Center-West Region, beaches at Rio de Janeiro and Santa Catarina, cultural tourism in Minas Gerais and business trips to São Paulo.

In terms of the 2024 Travel and Tourism Competitiveness Index (TTCI), which is a measurement of the factors that make it attractive to develop business in the travel and tourism industry of individual countries, Brazil ranked in the 26th place at the world's level, third in the Americas, after Canada and United States. Domestic tourism is a key market segment for the tourism industry in Brazil. In 2005, 51 million Brazilian nationals made ten times more trips than foreign tourists and spent five times more money than their international counterparts. The main destination states in 2023 were São Paulo, Rio de Janeiro, and Rio Grande do Sul. The main source of tourists for the entire country is São Paulo state. In terms of tourism revenues, the top earners by state were São Paulo and Bahia. For 2005, the three main trip purposes were visiting friends and family (53.1%), sun and beach (40.8%), and cultural tourism (12.5%).

=== Science and technology ===
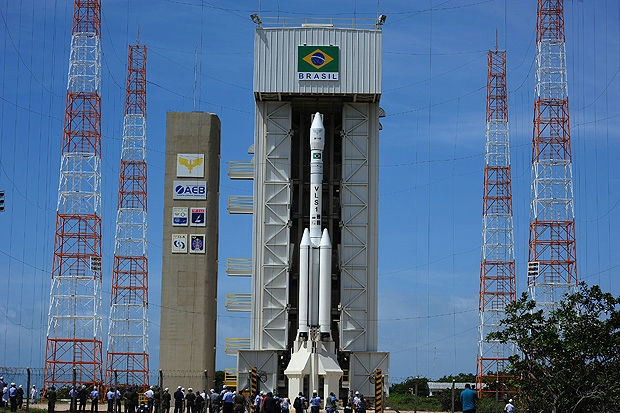
VLS-1 at the Alcântara Launch Center of the Brazilian Space Agency, in Alcântara, Maranhão

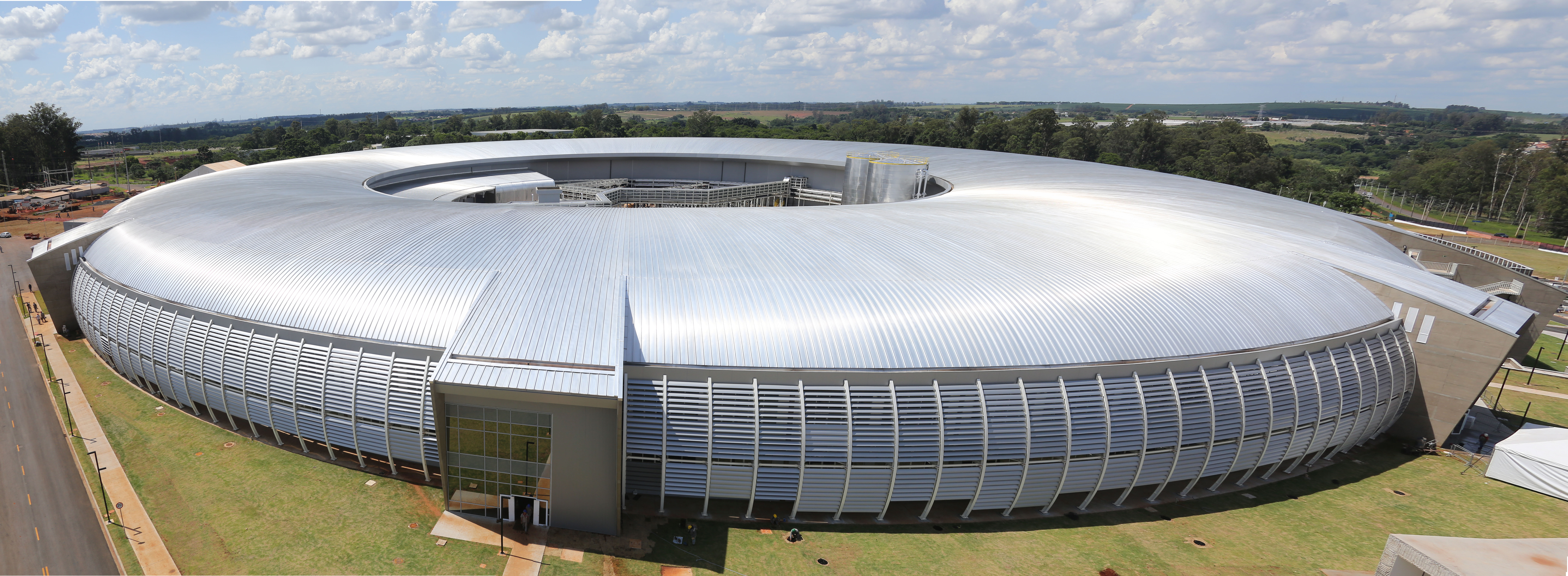
Sirius, a diffraction-limited storage ring synchrotron light source at the Laboratório Nacional de Luz Síncrotron, in Campinas, São Paulo

Technological research in Brazil is largely carried out in public universities and research institutes, with the majority of funding for basic research coming from various government agencies. Brazil's most esteemed technological hubs are the Oswaldo Cruz Institute, the Butantan Institute, the Air Force's Aerospace Technical Center, the Brazilian Agricultural Research Corporation and the National Institute for Space Research.

The Brazilian Space Agency has the most developed space program in Latin America, with significant capabilities in launch vehicles, launch sites, and satellite manufacturing. Brazil is the only country in the Southern Hemisphere involved in the International Space Station (ISS). The country also develops submarines and is the world's third largest aircraft producer, primarily through Embraer.

The country is also a pioneer in the search for oil in deep water, from where it extracts 73% of its reserves. Uranium is enriched at the Resende Nuclear Fuel Factory, mostly for research purposes, and its first nuclear submarine is expected to launch in 2029.

Brazil is one of the three countries in Latin America with an operational Synchrotron Laboratory (a research facility on physics, chemistry, material science and life sciences), and the only Latin American country with a domestic fabrication plant, the CEITEC. According to the Global Information Technology Report 2009–2010 of the World Economic Forum, Brazil is the world's 61st largest developer of information technology. Brazil ranked 52nd in the Global Innovation Index in 2025, up from 66th in 2019.

Among the most renowned Brazilian inventors are priests Bartolomeu de Gusmão, Landell de Moura and Francisco João de Azevedo, besides Alberto Santos-Dumont, Evaristo Conrado Engelberg, Manuel Dias de Abreu, Andreas Pavel and Nélio José Nicolai. Brazilian science is represented by the likes of César Lattes (Brazilian physicist Pathfinder of Pi Meson), Mário Schenberg (considered the greatest theoretical physicist of Brazil), José Leite Lopes (the only Brazilian physicist holder of the UNESCO Science Prize), Artur Avila (the first Latin American winner of the Fields Medal), and Fritz Müller (pioneer in factual support of the theory of evolution by Charles Darwin).

=== Energy ===
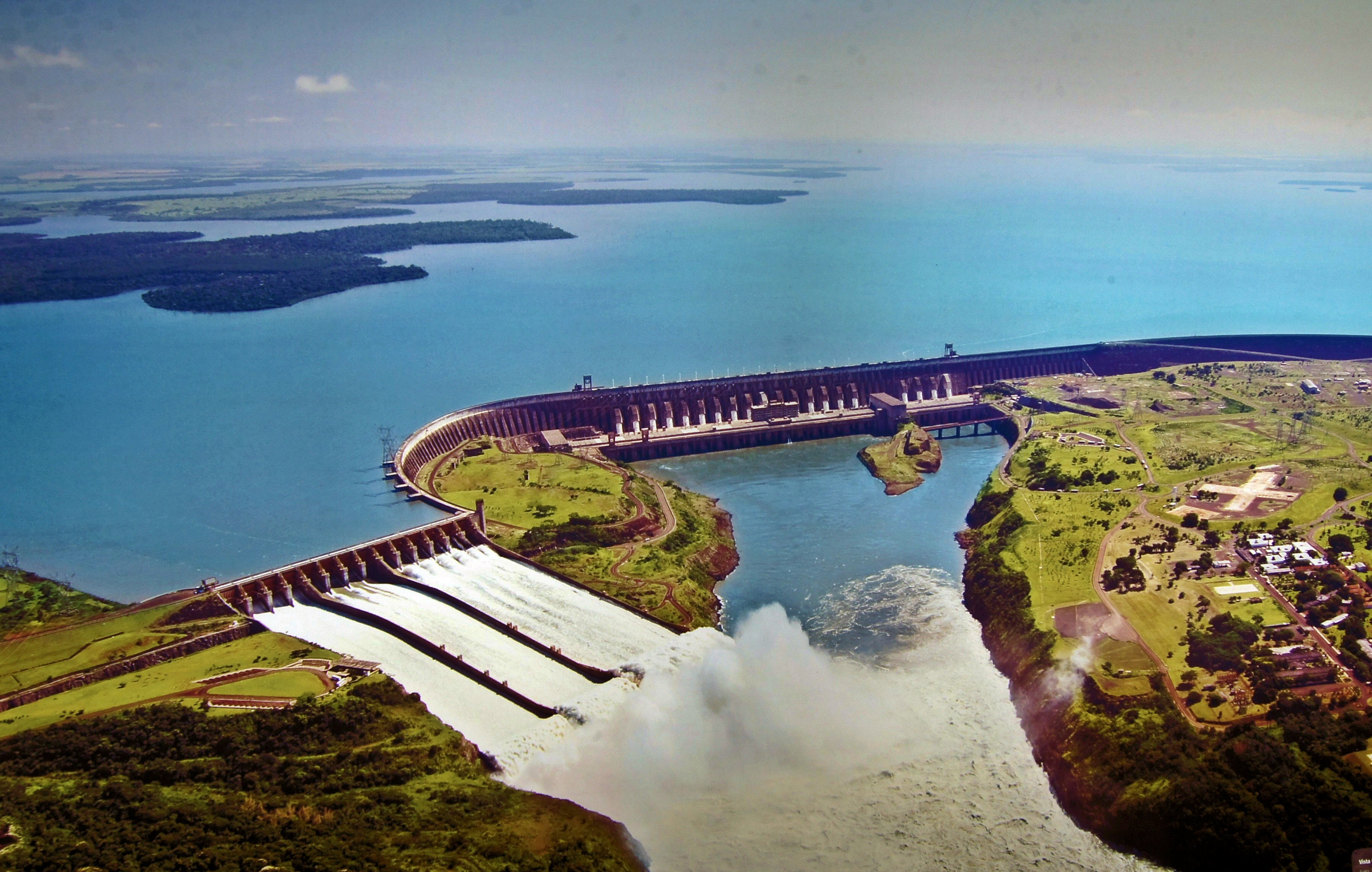
The Itaipu Dam on the Paraná River, the second largest of the world. Brazilian energy matrix is one of the cleanest in the world.

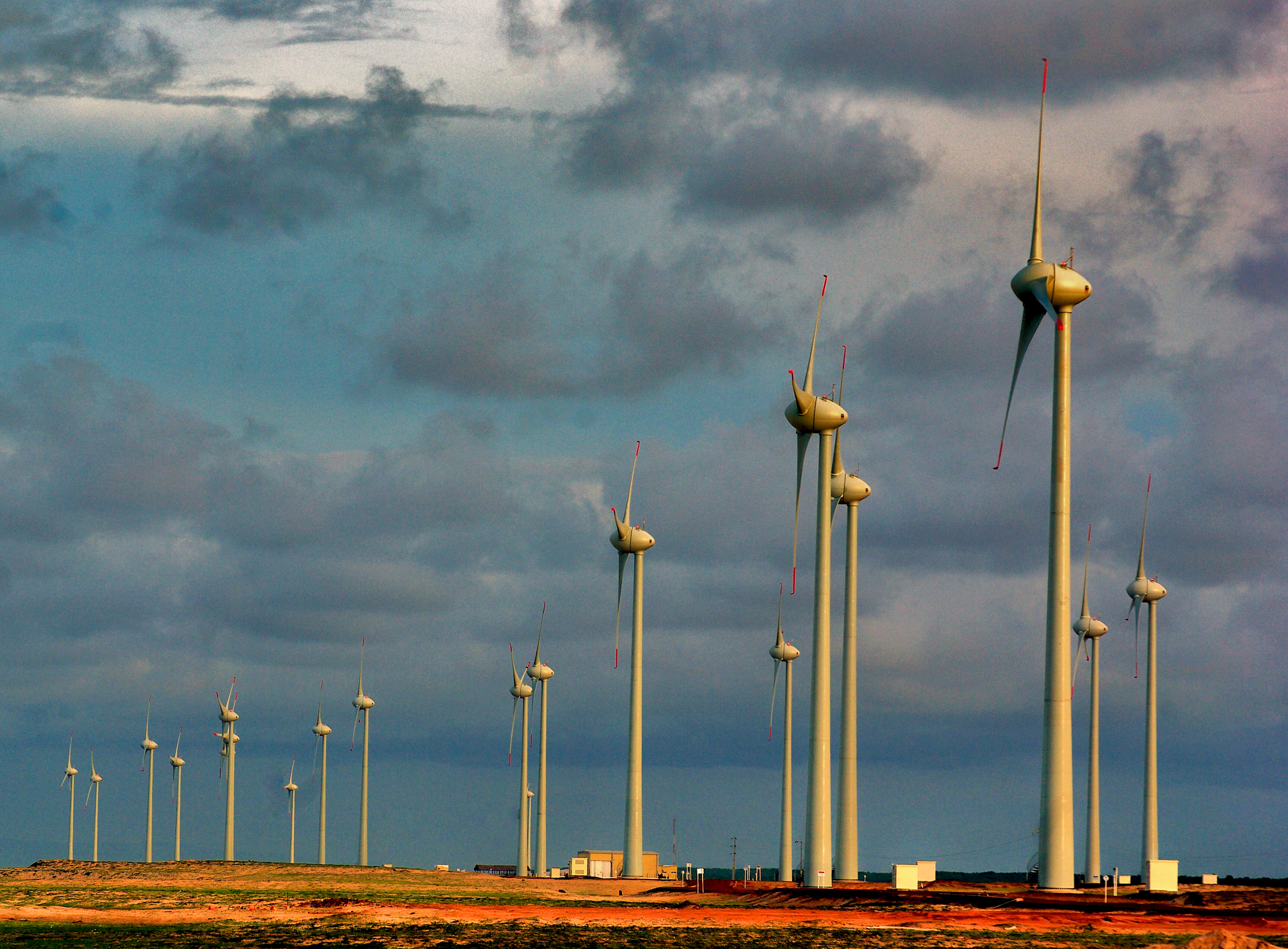
Wind farm in Parnaíba, Piauí. Brazil is one of the 5 largest producers of wind energy in the world.

Brazil is the world's eleventh-largest energy consumer. Much of its energy comes from renewable sources, particularly hydroelectricity and ethanol; the Itaipu Dam is the world's largest hydroelectric plant by energy generation, and the country has other large plants such as Belo Monte and Tucuruí. The first car with an ethanol engine was produced in 1978 and the first airplane engine running on ethanol in 2005.

At the end of 2025, Brazil ranked second in the world by installed hydroelectric power (110.3 GW) and biomass (18.4 GW), fifth in installed wind power (34.9 GW) and sixth in installed solar power (64.7 GW). At the end of 2024, Brazil was the fourth largest producer of wind energy in the world (107.8 TWh), behind only China, the United States and Germany, and the world's fifth largest producer of solar energy (74.7 TWh). Overall, Brazil ranks third globally in renewable electricity production, after China and the United States, accounting for 7% of the global total.

The Brazilian energy matrix is characterized by a higher degree of renewable energy than the global average; in 2025, the world energy matrix was only 14.5% renewable energy, compared to 49.5% in Brazil. Petroleum and oil products made up 34.3% of the country's matrix; sugar cane derivatives, 18%; hydraulic energy, 12.4%; natural gas, 12.2%; firewood and charcoal, 8.8%; varied renewable energies, 7%; mineral coal, 5.3%; nuclear, 1.4%, and other non-renewable energies, 0.6%. Similarly, the vast majority of Brazilian electricity is derived from renewable sources: 86.8% compared to 30.6% worldwide. The leading sources as of 2025 are hydraulic energy at 51.2%; wind, 14.9%; solar, 11.3%; natural gas, 7.5%; biomass, 7.2%; and nuclear, 2%. Brazil has the largest electricity sector in Latin America; its capacity at the end of 2021 was 181,532 MW.

The Brazilian government has embarked on a program over the decades to reduce dependence on imported oil, which previously accounted for more than 70% of the country's oil needs. Brazil became self-sufficient in oil in 2006–2007. By the end of 2021, the country was the seventh largest oil producer in the world, with an average of nearly three million barrels per day, and became an exporter of the product.

=== Transportation ===
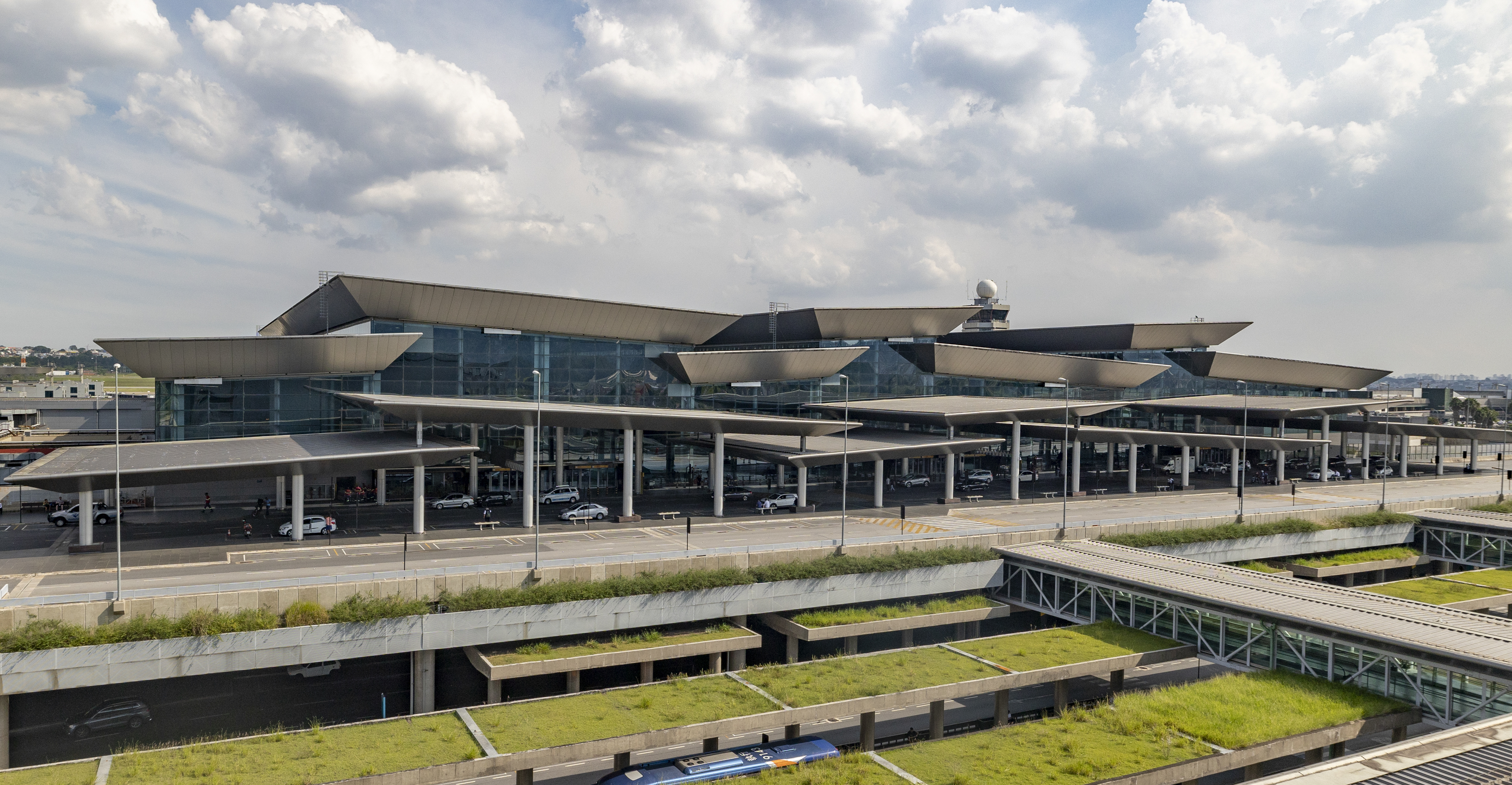
Terminal 3 of the São Paulo–Guarulhos International Airport, the busiest airport in Latin America

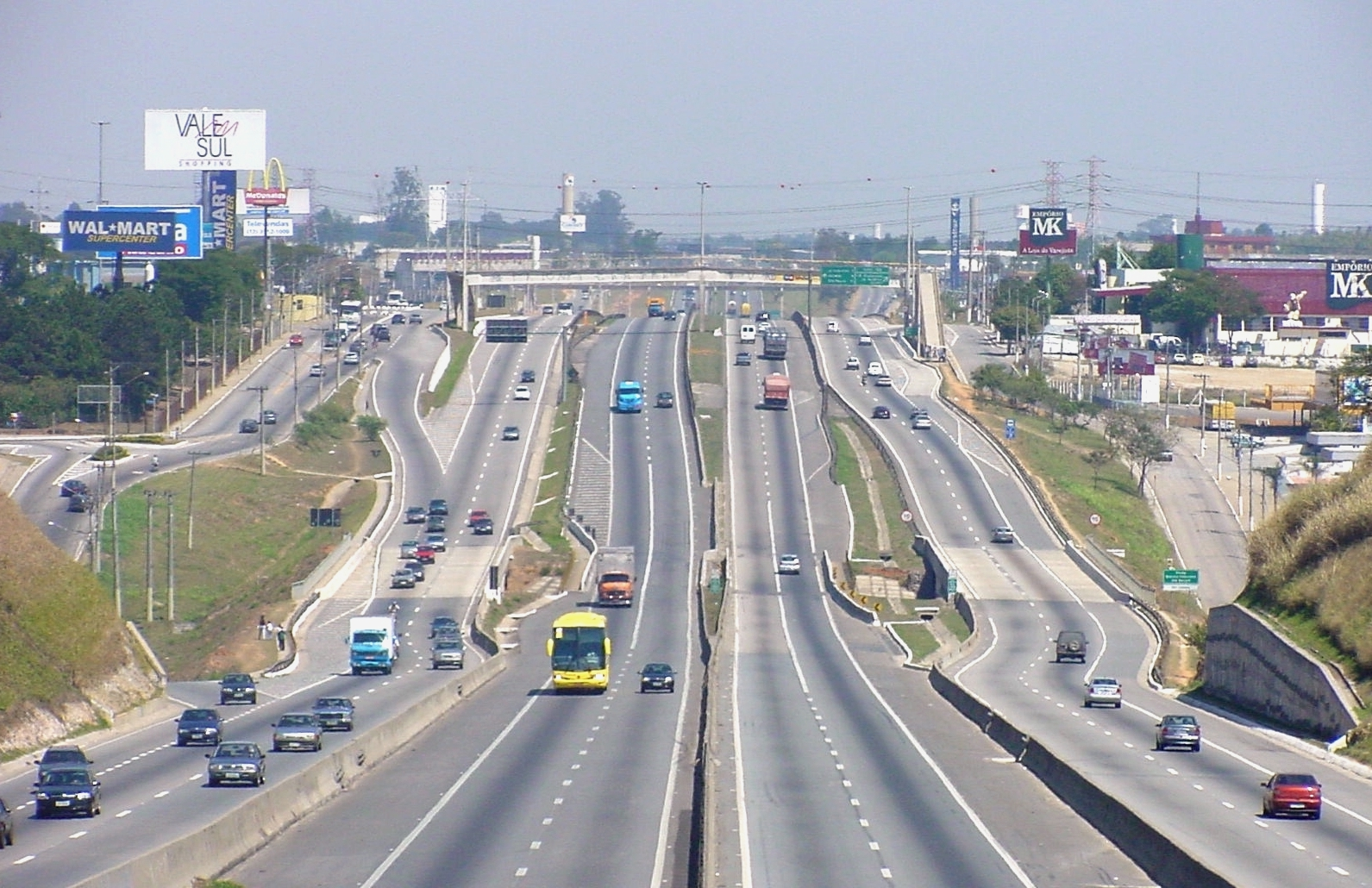
BR-116 in São José dos Campos, São Paulo, the longest highway in the country, with 4,542 km (2,822 mi) of extension

Brazilian roads are the primary carriers of freight and passenger traffic. The road system totaled 2,000,000 km (1,242,742 mi) in 2023, ranking fourth largest by size globally. The total of paved roads increased from 35,496 km (22,056 mi) in 1967 to 215,000 km (133,595 mi) in 2018.

Brazil's railway system has been declining since 1945, when emphasis shifted to highway construction. The country's total railway track length was 30,576 km (18,999 mi) in 2015, as compared with 31,848 km (19,789 mi) in 1970, making it the ninth largest network in the world. Most of the railway system belonged to the Federal Railroad Network Corporation (RFFSA), which was privatized in 2007. The São Paulo Metro began operating on 14 September 1974 as the first underground transit system in Brazil.

There are over 4,900 airports and airfields in Brazil, second only to the United States. São Paulo–Guarulhos International Airport, near São Paulo, is the largest and busiest airport with nearly 43 million passengers annually, while handling the vast majority of commercial traffic for the country.

For freight transport, waterways are of importance. The industrial zones of Manaus can be reached only by means of the Solimões–Amazonas waterway (3,250 kilometers or 2,020 miles in length, with a minimum depth of six meters or 20 feet). The country also has 50,000 kilometers (31,000 miles) of waterways. Coastal shipping links widely separated parts of the country. Bolivia and Paraguay have been given free ports at Santos. Of the 36 deep-water ports, Santos, Itajaí, Rio Grande, Paranaguá, Rio de Janeiro, Sepetiba, Vitória, Suape, Manaus and São Francisco do Sul are the most important. Bulk carriers have to wait up to 18 days before being serviced; container ships take 36.3 hours on average.

== Demographics ==
Population density of Brazilian municipalities

According to the latest official projection, Brazil's estimated population was 214,211,951 on 1 July 2026—an increase from the figure of 203 million reported by the 2022 census. The population of Brazil, as recorded by the 2008 PNAD, was approximately 190 million (22.31 inhabitants per square kilometer or 57.8/sq mi), with a ratio of men to women of 0.95:1 and 83.75% of the population defined as urban. The population is heavily concentrated in the Southeast (89 million inhabitants) and Northeast (54.6 million inhabitants), while the two most extensive regions, the Center-West and the North, which together make up 64.12% of Brazilian territory, have a total of only 33.8 million inhabitants.

The first census in Brazil was carried out in 1872 and recorded a population of 9,930,478. From 1880 to 1930, four million Europeans arrived. Brazil's population increased significantly between 1940 and 1970, because of a decline in the mortality rate, even though the birth rate underwent a slight decline. In the 1940s the annual population growth rate was 2.4%, rising to 3.0% in the 1950s and remaining at 2.9% in the 1960s, as life expectancy rose from 44 to 54 years, and to 72.6 years in 2007. It has been steadily falling since the 1960s, from 3.04% per year between 1950 and 1960 to 1.05% in 2008 and is expected to fall to a negative value of –0.29% by 2050, thus completing the demographic transition. In 2022, the illiteracy rate was roughly 7%, a significant decline from 11.48% in 2008. By comparison, in 1940, more than half the population (54%) was illiterate.

=== Urbanization ===
According to IBGE (Brazilian Institute of Geography and Statistics) urban areas concentrate 87.4% of the population, while the Southeast region remains the most populated one, with over 80 million inhabitants. The largest urban agglomerations in Brazil are São Paulo, Rio de Janeiro, and Belo Horizonte—all in the Southeastern Region—with 21.1, 12.3, and 5.1 million inhabitants respectively. The majority of state capitals are the largest cities in their states, except for Vitória, the capital of Espírito Santo, and Florianópolis, the capital of Santa Catarina.

Largest urban agglomerations in Brazil 2022 Census - IBGE
| Rank | Name | State | Pop. | Rank | Name | State | Pop. |
|---|---|---|---|---|---|---|---|
| 1 | São Paulo | São Paulo | 20,673,280 | 11 | Manaus | Amazonas | 2,063,689 |
| 2 | Rio de Janeiro | Rio de Janeiro | 11,760,550 | 12 | Campinas | São Paulo | 2,093,118 |
| 3 | Belo Horizonte | Minas Gerais | 4,963,704 | 13 | Belém | Pará | 1,957,533 |
| 4 | Brasília | Federal District | 3,858,760 | 14 | Vitória | Espírito Santo | 1,756,172 |
| 5 | Recife | Pernambuco | 3,783,639 | 15 | Baixada Santista | São Paulo | 1,672,991 |
| 6 | Porto Alegre | Rio Grande do Sul | 3,679,298 | 16 | São José dos Campos | São Paulo | 1,589,875 |
| 7 | Fortaleza | Ceará | 3,424,978 | 17 | São Luís | Maranhão | 1,458,836 |
| 8 | Curitiba | Paraná | 3,382,210 | 18 | Natal | Rio Grande do Norte | 1,263,738 |
| 9 | Salvador | Bahia | 3,320,568 | 19 | Maceió | Alagoas | 1,194,596 |
| 10 | Goiânia | Goiás | 2,481,043 | 20 | Florianópolis | Santa Catarina | 1,183,874 |

=== Race and ethnicity ===
Racial groups in Brazil (2022 census)
1. Pardos (mixed) (45.3%)
2. Whites (43.5%)
3. Blacks (10.2%)
4. Indigenous (0.60%)
5. East Asians (0.42%)

According to the 2022 Brazilian census, 45.3% of the population (92.1 million) described themselves as Pardo (meaning brown or multiracial), 43.5% (88.2 million) as White, 10.2% (20.7 million) as Black, 0.6% (1.2 million) as Indigenous and 0.4% (850,000) as East Asian (officially called yellow or amarela).

Since the arrival of the Portuguese in 1500, considerable genetic mixing between Amerindians, Europeans, and Africans has taken place in all regions of the country:

- European ancestry being dominant according to all autosomal studies undertaken covering the population, accounting for between 60% and 65% of the average genetic makeup of the Brazilian population.
- African ancestry among the Brazilians is estimated at 20% to 25% of the average genetic makeup
- Indigenous ancestry is significant and present in all regions of Brazil, accounting for around 15% to 20% of the average genetic ancestry of Brazilians.

From the 19th century, Brazil opened its borders to immigration. About five million people from over 60 countries migrated to Brazil between 1808 and 1972, most of them of Portuguese, Italian, Spanish, German, English, Ukrainian, Polish, Jewish, African, Armenian, Russian, Chinese, Japanese, Korean and Arab origin. Brazil has the second-largest Jewish community in Latin America after Argentina making up 0.06% of its population. Outside of the Arab world, Brazil also has the largest population of Arab ancestry in the world, with 15–20 million people. According to Brazil's Ministry of Foreign Affairs, Brazil is home to a Lebanese diaspora of 7-10 million, surpassing the population of Lebanese individuals residing in Lebanon.

Brazilian society is more markedly divided by social class lines, although a high income disparity is found between race groups, so racism and classism often overlap. The brown population (officially called pardo in Portuguese) is a broad category that includes caboclos (assimilated Amerindians in general, and descendants of Whites and Natives), mulatos (descendants of primarily Whites and Afro-Brazilians) and cafuzos (descendants of Afro-Brazilians and Natives). Higher percents of Blacks, mulattoes and tri-racials can be found in the eastern coast of the Northeastern region from Bahia to Paraíba and also in northern Maranhão, southern Minas Gerais and eastern Rio de Janeiro.

People of considerable Amerindian ancestry form the majority of the population in the Northern, Northeastern and Center-Western regions. In 2007, the National Indian Foundation estimated that Brazil has 67 different uncontacted tribes, up from their estimate of 40 in 2005. Brazil is believed to have the largest number of uncontacted peoples in the world.

=== Language ===
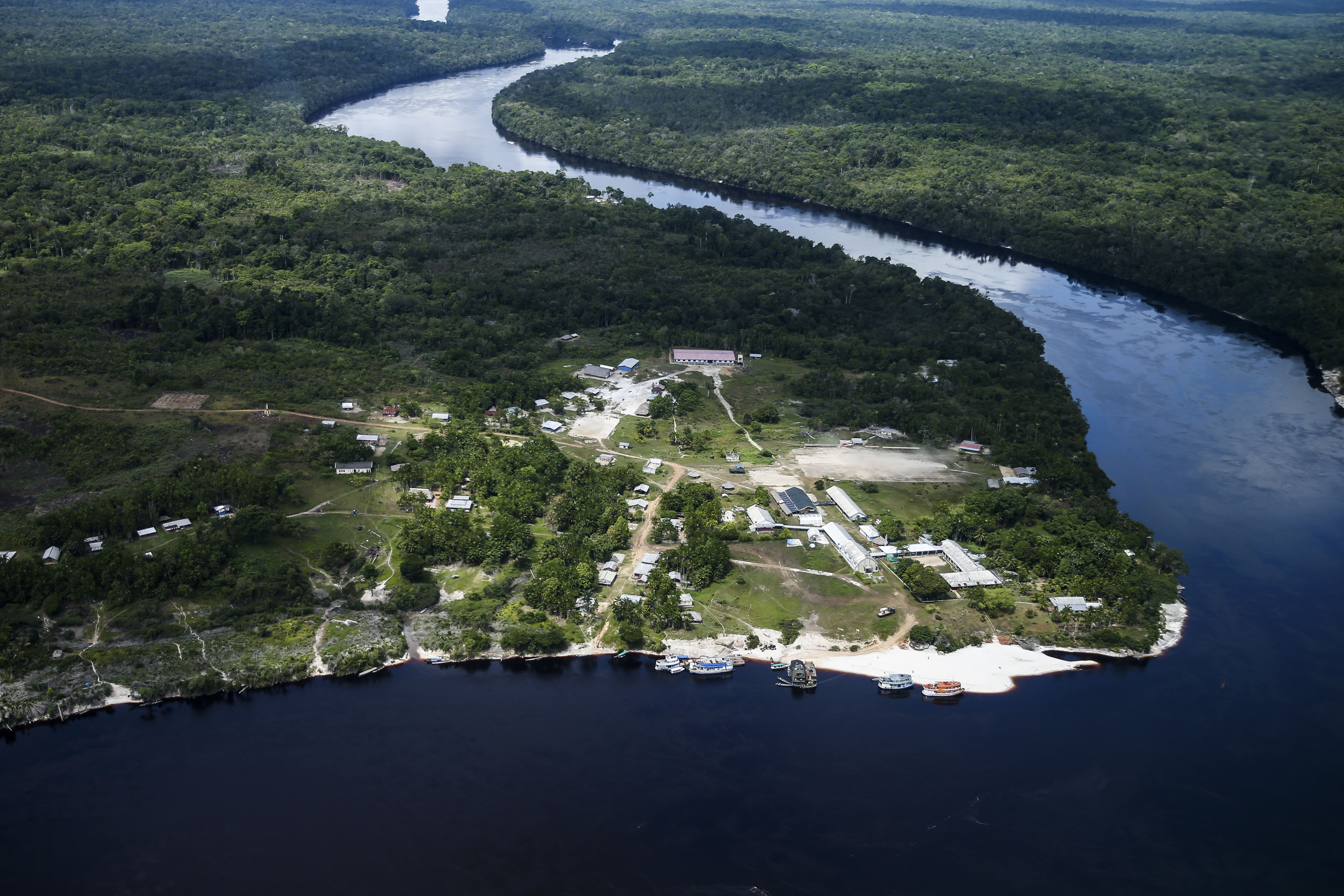
Alto Rio Negro Indigenous Territory, in São Gabriel da Cachoeira, Amazonas, where Nhengatu, Tucano and Baniwa are co-official languages

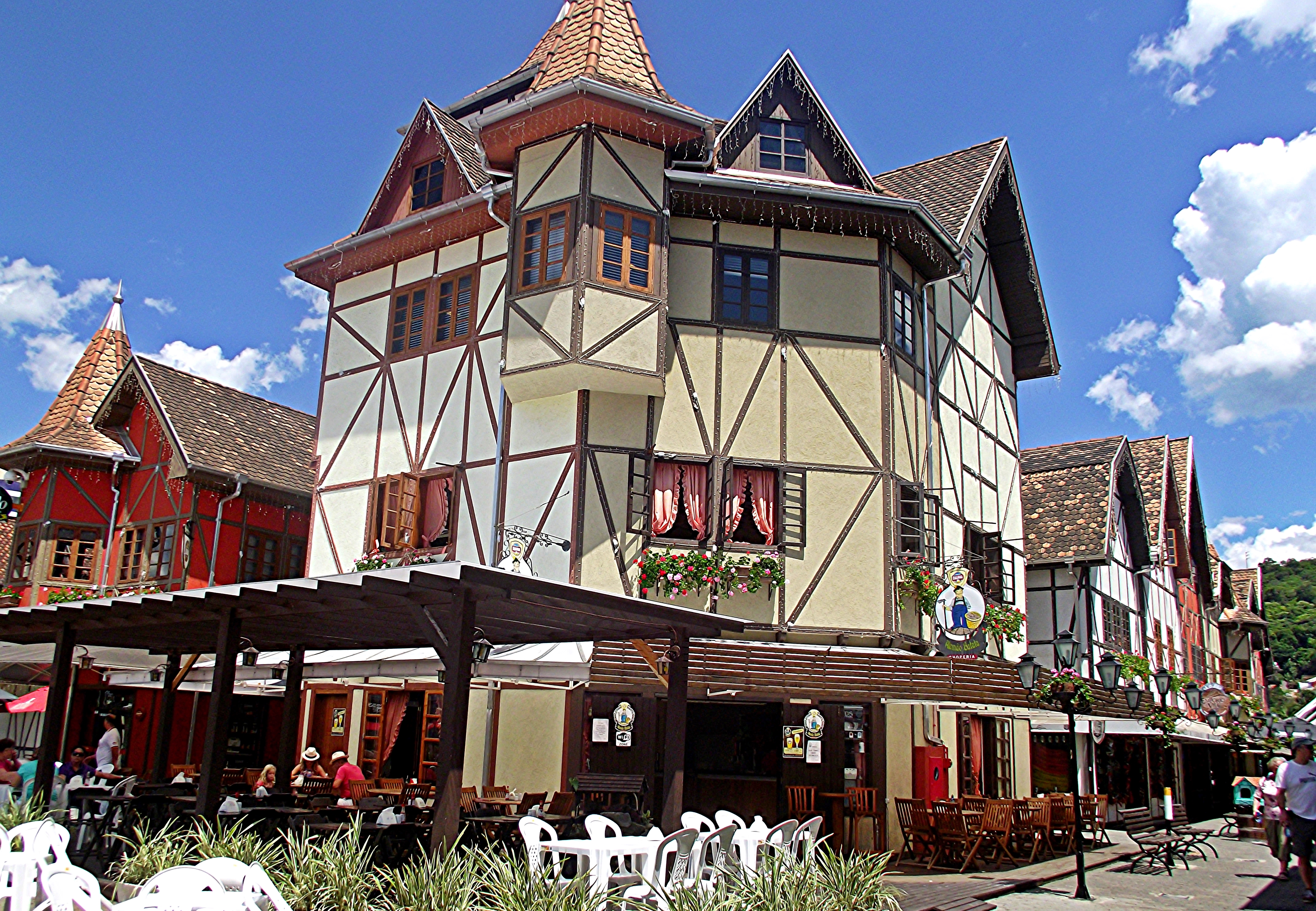
Pomerode, Santa Catarina, where the East Pomeranian is the second language (see Brazilian German)

The official language of Brazil is Portuguese (Article 13 of the Constitution of the Federal Republic of Brazil), which almost all of the population speaks and is virtually the only language used in newspapers, radio, television, and for business and administrative purposes. Brazil is the only Portuguese-speaking nation in the Americas, making the language an important part of Brazilian national identity and giving it a national culture distinct from those of its Spanish-speaking neighbors.

Brazilian Portuguese has had its own development, mostly similar to 16th-century Central and Southern dialects of European Portuguese (despite a very substantial number of Portuguese colonial settlers, and more recent immigrants, coming from Northern regions, and in minor degree Portuguese Macaronesia), with a few influences from the Amerindian and African languages, especially West African and Bantu restricted to the vocabulary only. As a result, the language is somewhat different, mostly in phonology, from the language of Portugal and other Portuguese-speaking countries (the dialects of the other countries, partly because of the more recent end of Portuguese colonialism in these regions, have a closer connection to contemporary European Portuguese). These differences are comparable to those between American and British English.

The 2002 sign language law requires government authorities and public agencies to accept and provide information in Língua Brasileira dos Sinais or "LIBRAS", the Brazilian Sign Language, while a 2005 presidential edict extends this to require teaching of the language as a part of the education and speech and language pathology curricula. LIBRAS teachers, instructors and translators are recognized professionals. Schools and health services must provide access ("inclusion") to deaf people.

Minority languages are spoken throughout the nation. One hundred and eighty Amerindian languages are spoken in remote areas and a significant number of other languages are spoken by immigrants and their descendants. In the municipality of São Gabriel da Cachoeira, Nheengatu (a currently endangered creole language that, together with its southern relative língua geral paulista, once was a major lingua franca in Brazil), Baniwa and Tucano languages had been granted co-official status with Portuguese.

There are significant communities of German (mostly the Brazilian Hunsrückisch, a High German language dialect) and Italian (mostly the Talian, a Venetian dialect) origins in the Southern and Southeastern regions, whose ancestors' native languages were carried along to Brazil, and which, still alive there, are influenced by the Portuguese language. Talian is officially a historic heritage of Rio Grande do Sul, and two German dialects possess co-official status in a few municipalities. Italian is also recognized as "ethnic language" in Santa Teresa and Vila Velha, in the state of Espírito Santo.

=== Religion ===
Religion in Brazil (2022 census)
1. Catholicism (56.8%)
2. Protestantism (26.9%)
3. No religion (9.28%)
4. Spiritism (1.84%)
5. Other religions (5.06%)
6. Not stated (0.17%)

Christianity is the country's predominant faith, with Catholicism being its largest denomination. Brazil has the world's largest Catholic population. According to the 2022 demographic census (the PNAD survey does not inquire about religion), 56.75% of the population followed Catholicism; 26.85% Protestantism; 1.84% Kardecist spiritism; 5.06% other religions, undeclared or undetermined; while 9.28% had no religion.

Religious diversity in Brazil developed from the meeting of the Catholic Church with the religious traditions of enslaved African peoples and indigenous peoples. This confluence of faiths during the Portuguese colonization of Brazil led to the development of a diverse array of syncretistic practices within the overarching umbrella of Brazilian Catholic Church, characterized by traditional Portuguese festivities.

Religious pluralism increased during the 20th century, and the Protestant community had grown to include over 22% of the population by 2010—partly due to a mixture of American missionary and US government influence. The most common Protestant denominations are Evangelical Pentecostal ones. Other Protestant branches with a notable presence in the country include the Baptists, Seventh-day Adventists, Lutherans and the Reformed tradition. In recent decades, Protestantism, particularly in forms of Pentecostalism and Evangelicalism, has spread in Brazil, while the proportion of Catholics had dropped significantly during the 2010s. (Note: See the drop-down essay on "The Growth of Religious Pluralism" for further details.) As they have spread throughout Brazil, many have even been deeply involved in Brazilian and international politics, and Evangelical Protestant influence has been implicated in the 2022 Brazilian coup plot. Since 2022, Evangelicals and Catholics have begun reconsidering religion as a political factor; however, several Evangelical denominations have continued strategically expanding their power in national politics.

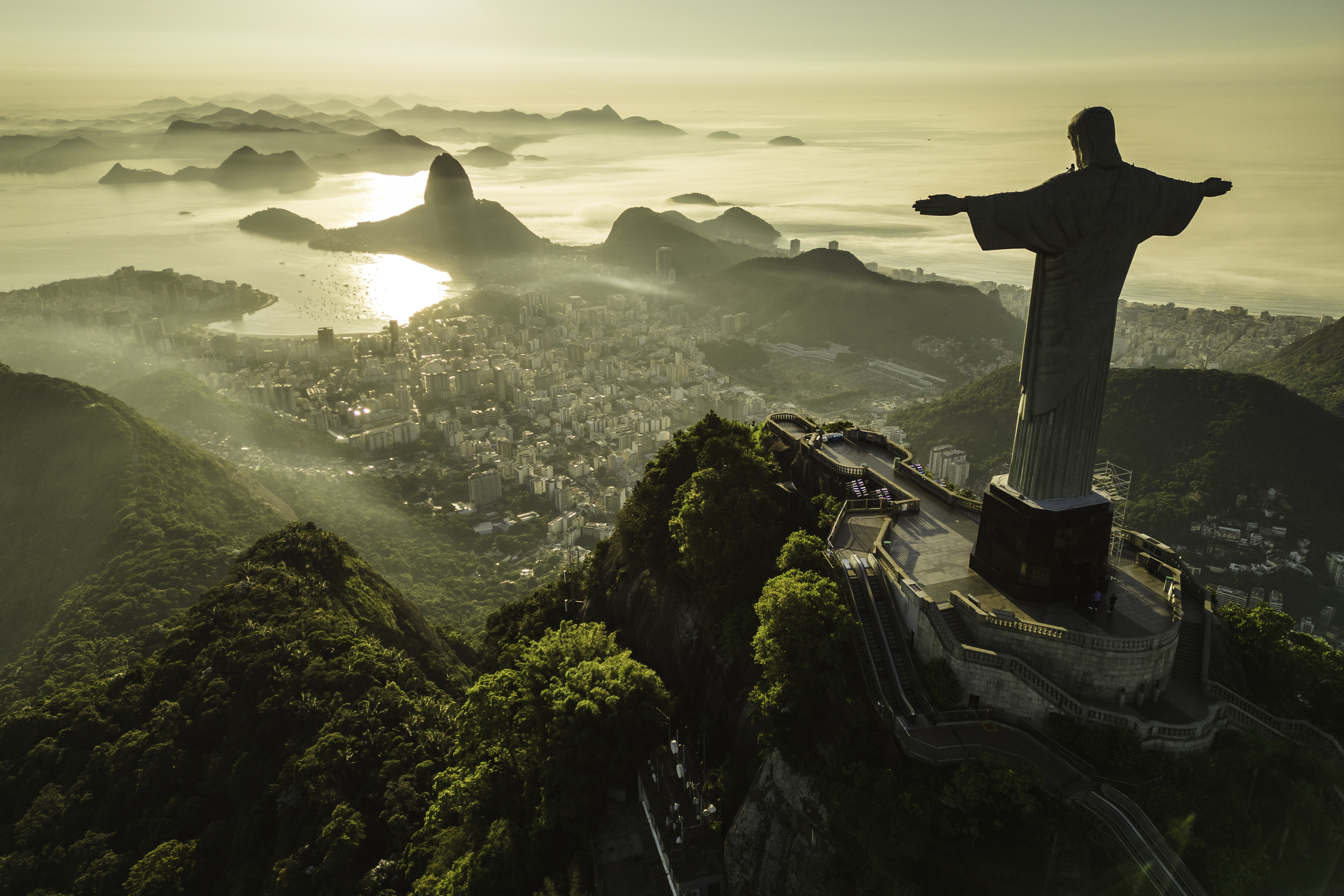
The Cristo Redentor statue towers over Rio de Janeiro.

After Protestantism, individuals professing no religion are also a significant group, having exceeded 8% of the population according to the 2010 census. The cities of Boa Vista, Salvador, and Porto Velho have the greatest proportion of Irreligious residents in Brazil. Teresina, Fortaleza, and Florianópolis were the most Roman Catholic in the country. Greater Rio de Janeiro, not including the city proper, is the most irreligious and least Roman Catholic Brazilian periphery, while Greater Porto Alegre and Greater Fortaleza are on the opposite sides of the lists, respectively.

In October 2009, the Brazilian Senate approved, and enacted by the President of Brazil in February 2010, an agreement with the Vatican, in which the Legal Statute of the Catholic Church in Brazil is recognized.

=== Education ===
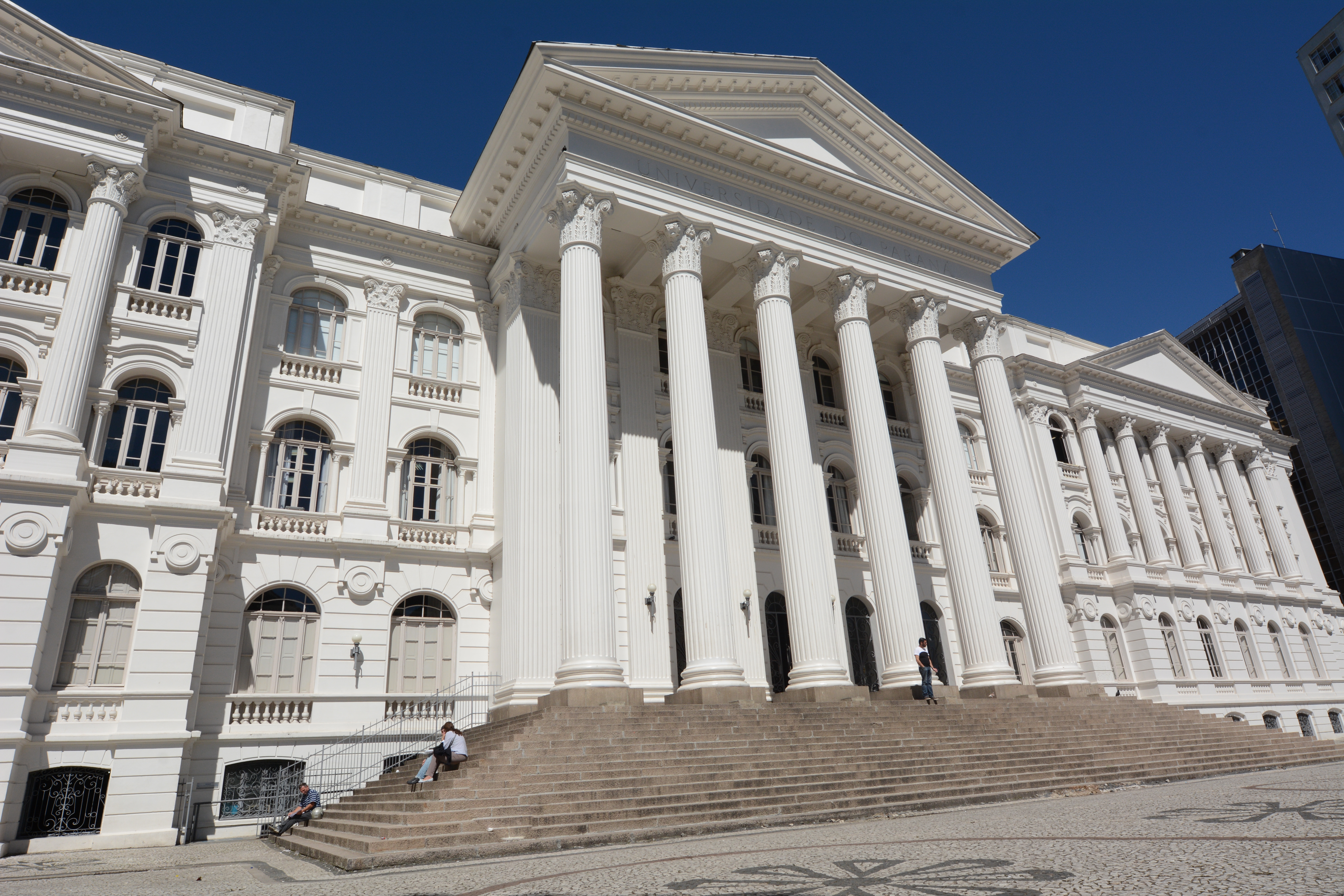
Historical building of the Federal University of Paraná, one of the oldest universities in Brazil, located in Curitiba

The Federal Constitution and the Law of Guidelines and Bases of National Education determine that the union, the states, the Federal District and the municipalities must manage and organize their respective education systems. Each of these public educational systems is responsible for its own maintenance, which manages funds as well as the mechanisms and funding sources. The constitution reserves 25% of the state budget and 18% of federal taxes and municipal taxes for education.

According to the IBGE, the literacy rate was 95.1% in 2025, meaning that 8.4 million (4.9% of population) people aged 15 and over are still illiterate in the country, with some states such as Rio de Janeiro and Santa Catarina reaching around 97% of literacy rate; functional illiteracy has reached 21.6% of the population. Illiteracy is higher in the Northeast, where 10.6% of the population is illiterate, while the Southeast has 2.3% illiteracy.

Brazil's private institutions tend to be more exclusive and offer better quality education, so many high-income families send their children there. The result is a segregated educational system that reflects extreme income disparities and reinforces social inequality. However, efforts to change this are making impacts. The University of São Paulo is often considered the best in Brazil and Latin America. Of the top 20 Latin American universities, eight are Brazilian; most are public. Attending an institution of higher education is required by Law of Guidelines and Bases of Education. Kindergarten, elementary and medium education are required of all students.

=== Health ===
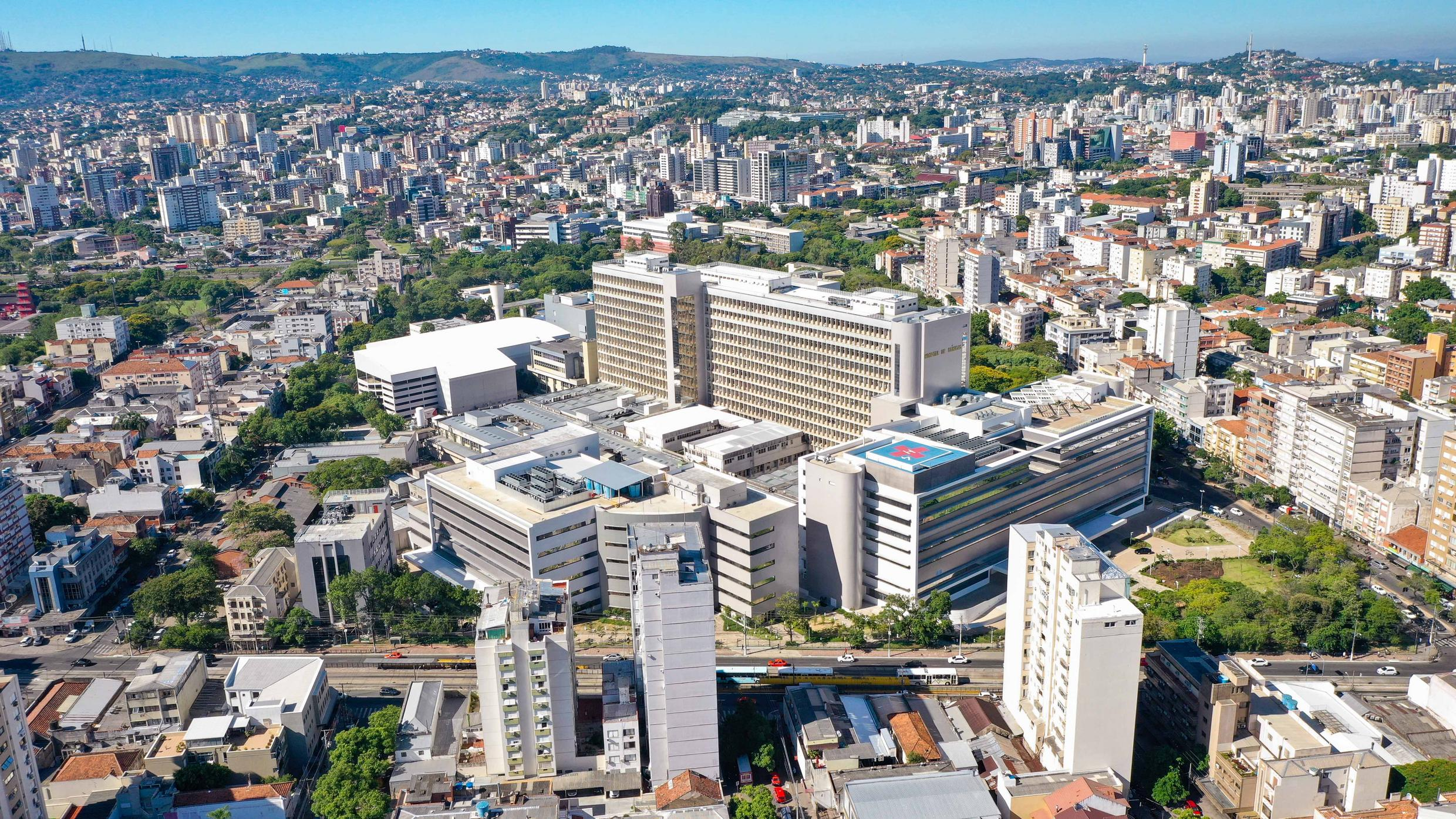
The Clinical Hospital of Porto Alegre is academically linked to the Federal University of Rio Grande do Sul and is part of the SUS, the Brazilian publicly funded health care system.

The Brazilian public health system, the Unified Health System (Sistema Único de Saúde – SUS), is managed and provided by all levels of government, being the largest system of this type in the world. On the other hand, private healthcare systems play a complementary role. Public health services are universal and offered to all citizens of the country for free. However, the construction and maintenance of health centers and hospitals are financed by taxes, and the country spends about 9% of its GDP on expenditures in the area. In 2023, Brazil had 2.4 doctors and 2.5 hospital beds for every 1,000 inhabitants.

Despite all the progress made since the creation of the universal health care system in 1988, there are still several public health issues in Brazil. In 2023, infant (2.51%) and maternal mortality rates (197.3 deaths per 100,000 births) were still high.

The number of deaths from noncommunicable diseases, such as cardiovascular diseases (151.7 deaths per 100,000 inhabitants) and cancer (72.7 deaths per 100,000 inhabitants), also has a considerable impact on the health of the Brazilian population. Finally, external but preventable factors such as car accidents, violence and suicide caused 14.9% of all deaths in the country. The Brazilian health system was ranked 125th among the 191 countries evaluated by the World Health Organization (WHO) in 2000.

== Culture ==
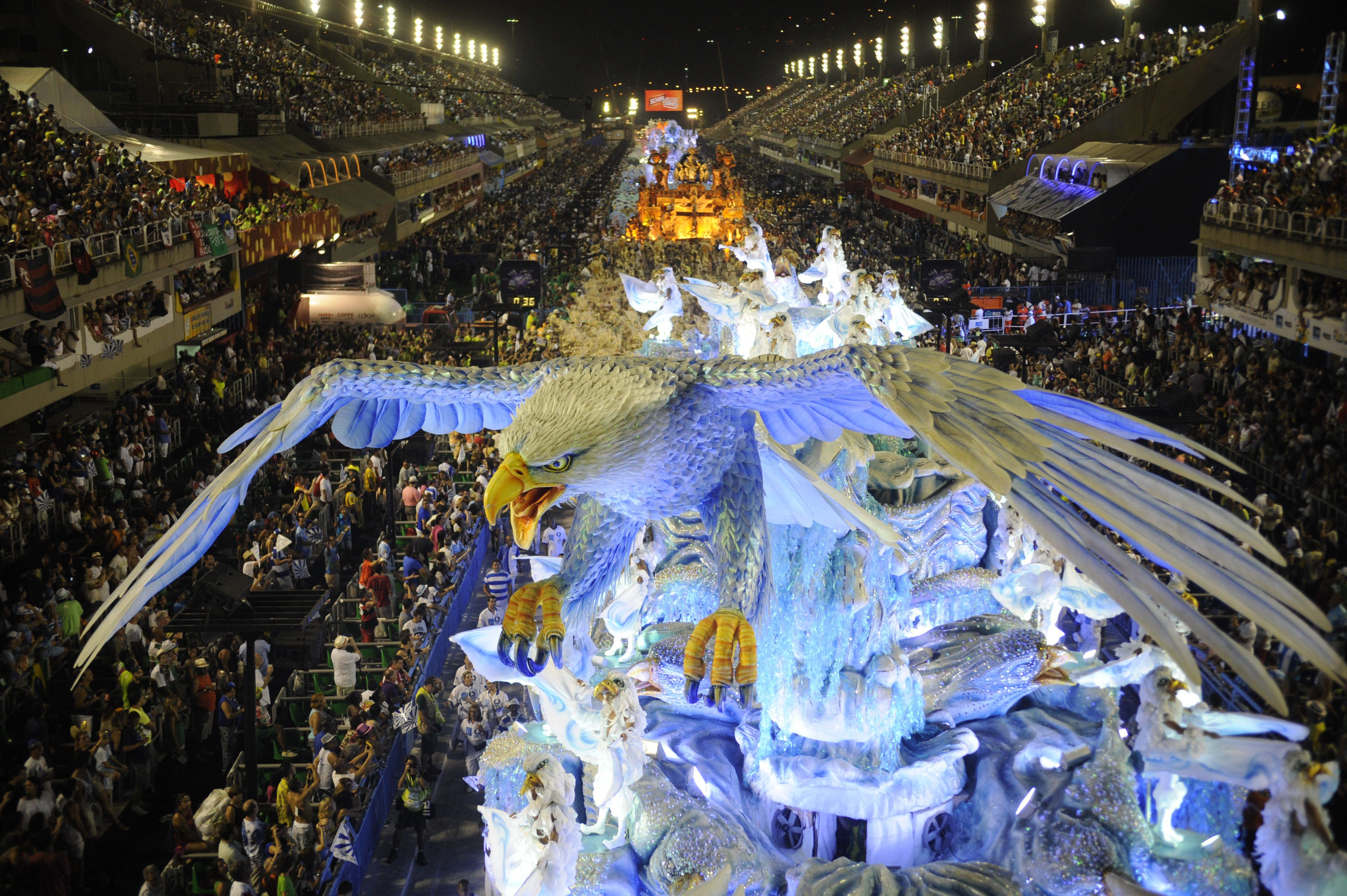
Parade of Portela samba school at the Rio Carnival, the largest carnival in the world

The core culture of Brazil is derived from Portuguese culture, due to its strong colonial ties with the Portuguese Empire. Among other influences, the Portuguese introduced the Portuguese language, Roman Catholicism and colonial architectural styles. Brazilian culture was also strongly influenced by African, indigenous and non-Portuguese European cultures and traditions.

Some aspects of Brazilian culture were shaped by the contributions of successive waves of immigrants who arrived in large numbers in the south and southeast of Brazil during the 19th and 20th centuries, including Italians, Germans and other Europeans as well as Japanese, Jewish and Arab communities. The indigenous Amerindians influenced Brazil's language and cuisine; and the Africans influenced language, cuisine, music, dance and religion.

Brazilian art has developed since the 16th century into different styles that range from Baroque (the dominant style in Brazil until the early 19th century) to Romanticism, Modernism, Expressionism, Cubism, Surrealism and Abstractionism. Brazilian cinema dates back to the birth of the medium in the late 19th century and has gained a new level of international acclaim since the 1960s.

Brazilian culture has long enjoyed periodic global influence and interest, often described as the phenomenon of "Brazilianness" (brasilidade)—a unique blend of music, dance, cinema, sport and other cultural elements that attract emulation, admiration, and commentary.

=== Architecture ===
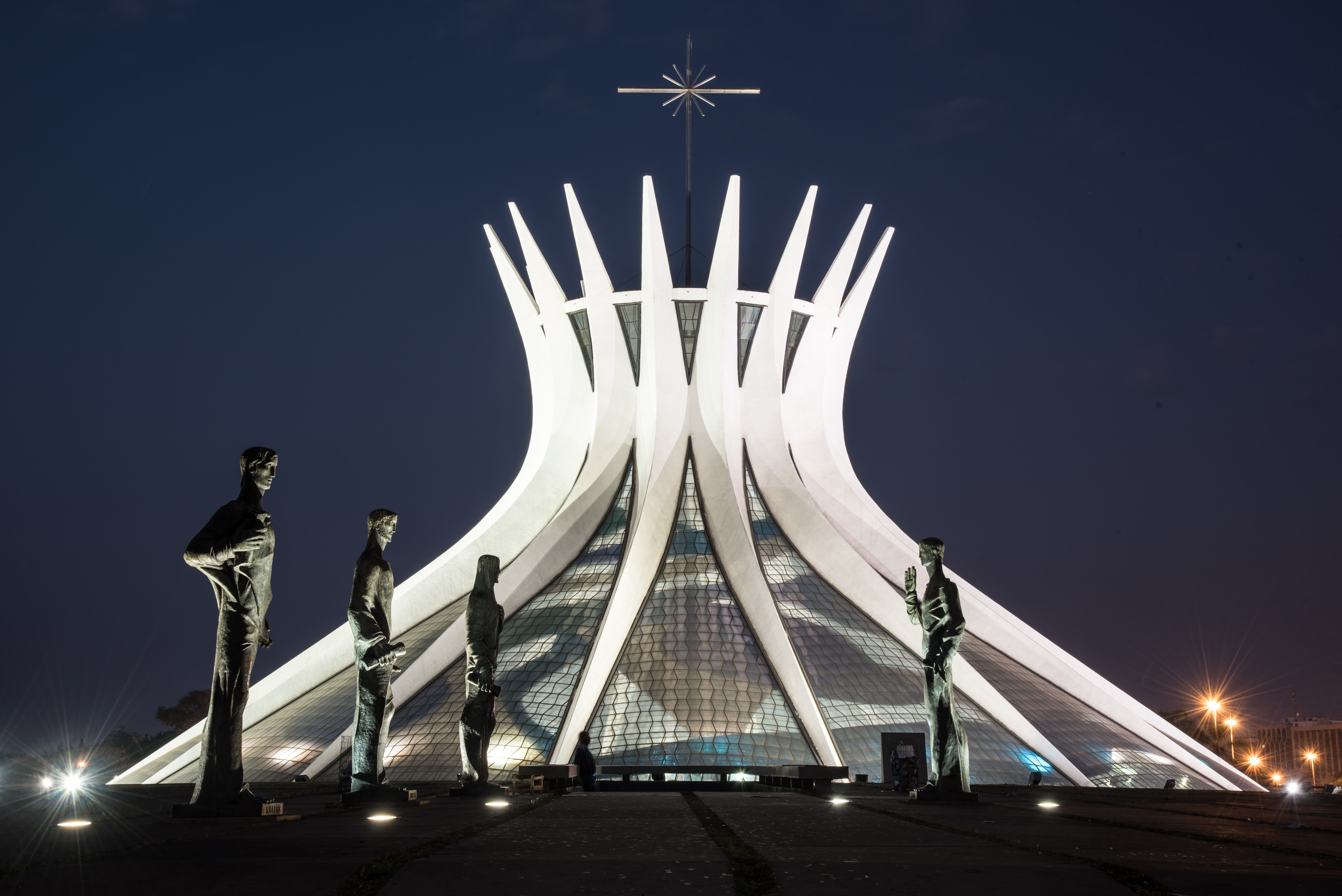
The Cathedral of Brasília, designed by Brazilian architect Oscar Niemeyer for the federal capital, an example of Modern architecture

The architecture of Brazil is influenced by Europe, especially Portugal. It has a history that goes back 500 years to the time, when Pedro Álvares Cabral landed in Brazil in 1500. Portuguese colonial architecture was the first wave of architecture to go to Brazil. It is the basis for all Brazilian architecture of later centuries. In the 19th century, during the time of the Empire of Brazil, the country followed European trends and adopted Neoclassical and Gothic Revival architecture. Then, in the 20th century, especially in Brasília, Brazil experimented with modernist architecture.

The colonial architecture of Brazil dates to the early 16th century, when Brazil was first explored, conquered and settled by the Portuguese. The Portuguese built architecture familiar to them in Europe in their aim to colonize Brazil. They built Portuguese colonial architecture, which included churches and civic architecture, including houses and forts, in Brazilian cities and the countryside.

During the 19th century, Brazilian architecture saw the introduction of more European styles to Brazil, such as Neoclassical and Gothic Revival architecture. This was usually mixed with Brazilian influences from their own heritage. In the 1950s modernist architecture was introduced when Brasília was built as a new federal capital in the interior of Brazil to help develop the interior. The architect Oscar Niemeyer idealized and built government buildings, churches and civic buildings in the modernist style.

=== Visual arts ===
Entry in the Forest mural at the Thomas Jefferson Building by Candido Portinari, one of the most important Brazilian painters

Brazilian painting emerged in the late 16th century, influenced by Baroque, Rococo, Neoclassicism, Romanticism, Realism, Modernism, Expressionism, Surrealism, Cubism and Abstracionism making it a major art style called Brazilian academic art.

The French Artistic Mission arrived in Brazil in 1816 proposing the creation of an art academy modeled after the respected Académie des Beaux-Arts, with graduation courses both for artists and craftsmen for activities such as modeling, decorating, carpentry and others and bringing artists such as Jean-Baptiste Debret.

Upon the creation of the Imperial Academy of Fine Arts, new artistic movements spread across the country during the 19th century and later the event called Modern Art Week broke with academic tradition in 1922 and started a nationalist trend which was influenced by modernist arts.

Among the best-known Brazilian painters are Ricardo do Pilar and Manoel da Costa Ataíde (baroque and rococo), Victor Meirelles, Pedro Américo and Almeida Júnior (romanticism and realism), Anita Malfatti, Ismael Nery, Lasar Segall, Emiliano Di Cavalcanti, Vicente do Rego Monteiro, and Tarsila do Amaral (expressionism, surrealism and cubism), Aldo Bonadei, José Pancetti and Candido Portinari (modernism).

=== Music ===
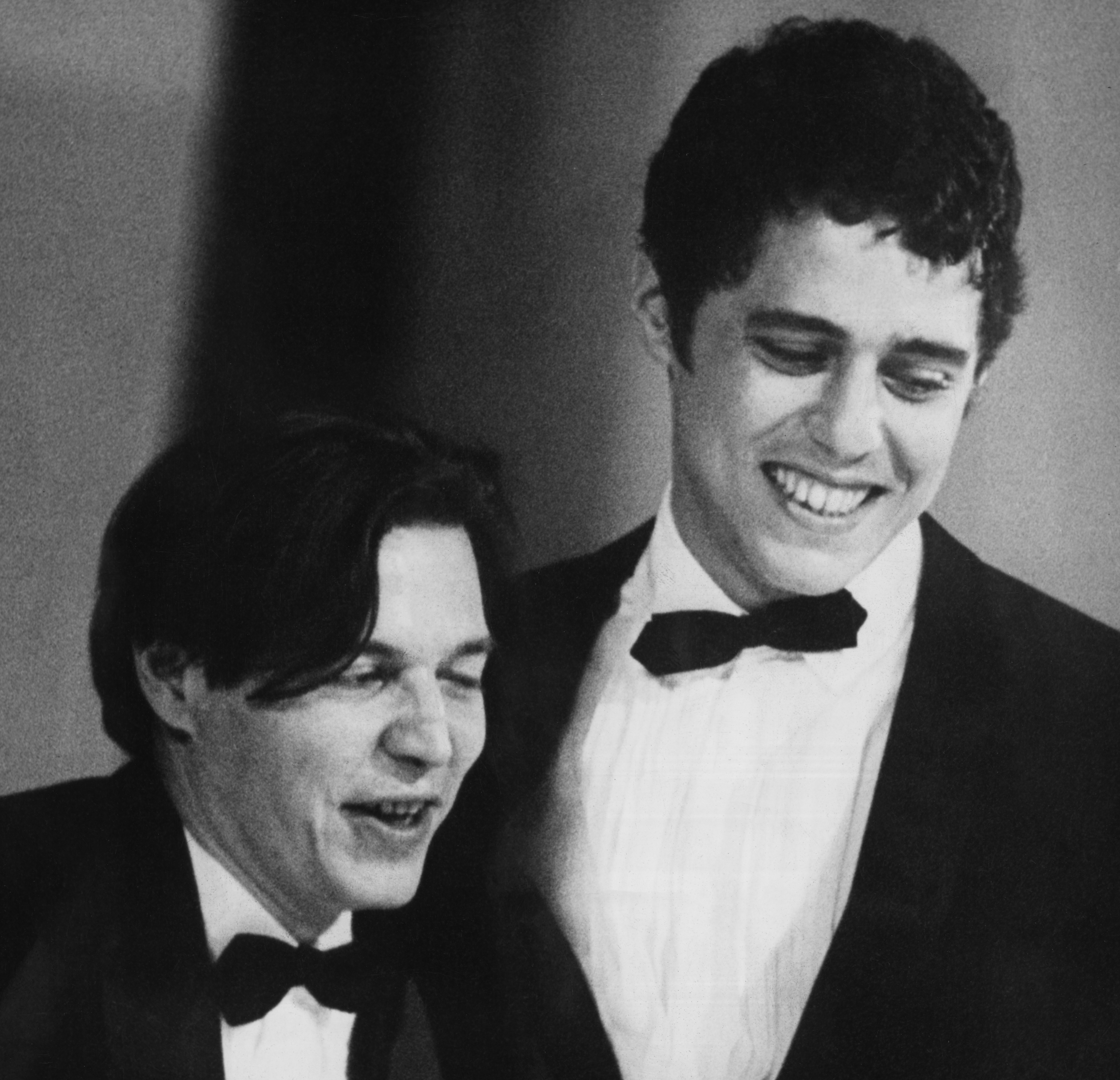
Tom Jobim, one of the creators of bossa nova, and Chico Buarque, one of the leading names of MPB

The music of Brazil was formed mainly from the fusion of European, Native Indigenous, and African elements. Until the nineteenth century, Portugal was the gateway to most of the influences that built Brazilian music, although many of these elements were not of Portuguese origin, but generally European. The first was José Maurício Nunes Garcia, author of sacred pieces with an influence of Viennese classicism. The major contribution of the African element was the rhythmic diversity and some dances and instruments.

Popular music since the late eighteenth century, samba was considered the most typical and on the UNESCO cultural heritage list. Samba-reggae, Axé, Maracatu, Frevo and Afoxê are four music traditions that have been popularized by their appearance in the annual Brazilian Carnivals. Capoeira is usually played with its own music referred to as capoeira music, which is usually considered to be a call-and-response type of folk music. Forró is a type of folk music prominent during the Festa Junina in northeastern Brazil. Jack A. Draper III, a professor of Portuguese at the University of Missouri, argues that Forró was used as a way to subdue feelings of nostalgia for a rural lifestyle.

Choro is a popular musical instrumental style. Its origins are in 19th-century Rio de Janeiro. The style often has a fast and happy rhythm, characterized by subtle modulations and full of syncopation and counterpoint. lambada and Carimbó achieved success in Latin music, originating from Pará. Bossa nova is also a well-known style of Brazilian music developed and popularized in the 1950s and 1960s. The phrase "bossa nova" means literally 'new trend'. A lyrical fusion of samba and jazz, bossa nova acquired a large following starting in the 1960s.

=== Literature ===
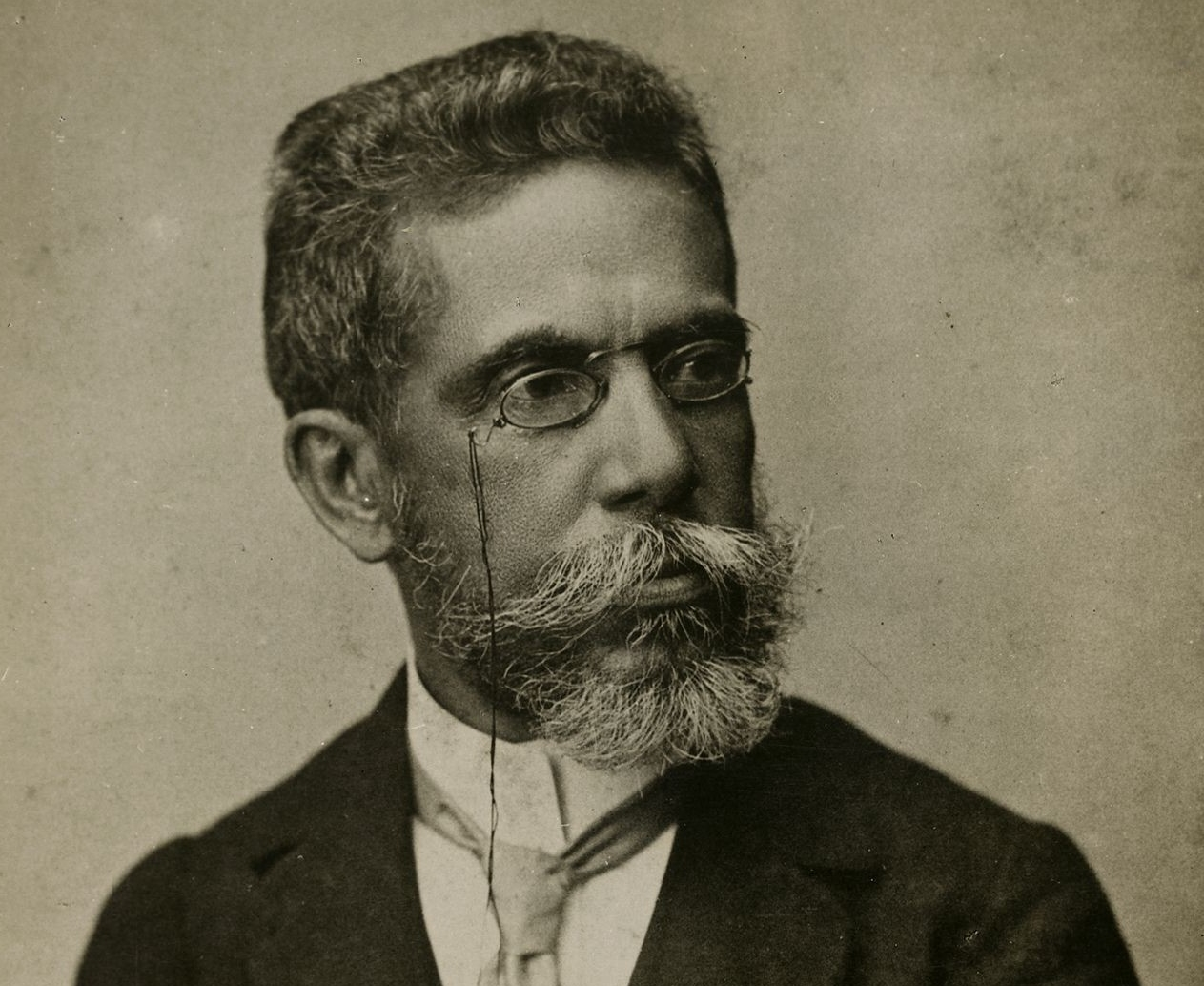
Machado de Assis (1839–1908), poet and novelist, founder of the Brazilian Academy of Letters, is associated with romanticism and literary realism.

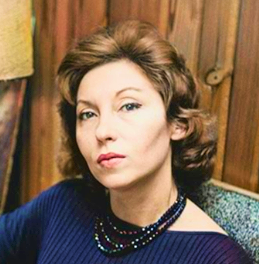
Clarice Lispector (1920–1977), novelist and short story writer, whose work engages themes of intimacy and introspection

Brazilian literature dates back to the 16th century, to the writings of the first Portuguese explorers in Brazil, such as Pero Vaz de Caminha, filled with descriptions of fauna, flora and commentary about the indigenous population that fascinated European readers.

Brazil produced significant works in Romanticism—novelists such as Joaquim Manuel de Macedo and José de Alencar wrote novels about love and pain. Alencar, in his long career, also treated indigenous people as heroes in the Indigenist novels O Guarani, Iracema and Ubirajara. Machado de Assis, one of his contemporaries, wrote in virtually all genres and continues to gain international prestige from critics worldwide.

Brazilian Modernism, evidenced by the Modern Art Week in 1922, was concerned with a nationalist avant-garde literature, while Post-Modernism brought a generation of distinct poets such as João Cabral de Melo Neto, Carlos Drummond de Andrade, Vinicius de Moraes, Cora Coralina, Graciliano Ramos, Cecília Meireles, and internationally known writers dealing with universal and regional subjects such as Jorge Amado, João Guimarães Rosa, Clarice Lispector and Manuel Bandeira.

Brazil's most significant literary award is the Camões Prize, which it shares with the rest of the Portuguese-speaking world. As of 2016, Brazil has eleven recipients of the prize. Brazil also holds its own literary academy, the Brazilian Academy of Letters, a non-profit cultural organization aimed at perpetuating the care of the national language and literature.

=== Theatre ===
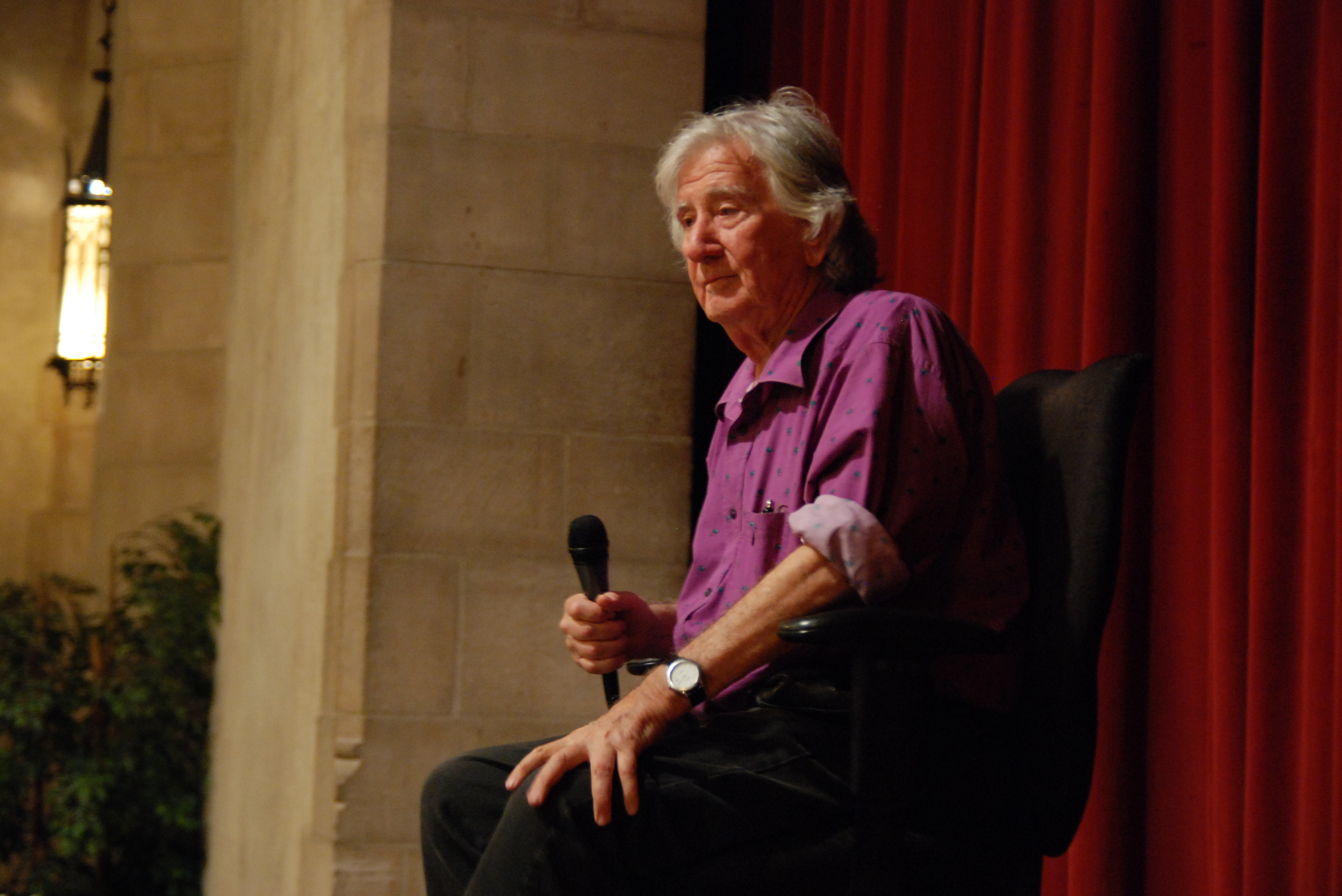
Augusto Boal presenting a workshop on the Theatre of the Oppressed at Riverside Church in New York City in 2008

The theatre in Brazil has its origins in the period of Jesuit expansion, when theater was used for the dissemination of Catholic doctrine in the 16th century. In the 17th and 18th centuries, dramatists on the scene of European derivation were for court or private performances. During the 19th century, the playwrights Antônio Gonçalves Dias and Luís Carlos Martins Pena were known for their performance. There were also numerous operas and orchestras. The Brazilian conductor Antônio Carlos Gomes became internationally known with operas such as Il Guarany. At the end of the 19th century, orchestrated dramaturgias were accompanied with songs of famous artists such as the conductress Chiquinha Gonzaga.

Already in the early 20th century there was the presence of theaters, entrepreneurs and actor companies. In 1940, Paschoal Carlos Magno and his student's theater, the comedians group and the Italian actors Adolfo Celi, Ruggero Jacobbi and Aldo Calvo, founders of the Teatro Brasileiro de Comédia, renewed the Brazilian theater. From the 1960s, it was attended by a theater dedicated to social and religious issues. The most prominent authors at this stage were Jorge Andrade and Ariano Suassuna.

=== Cinema ===
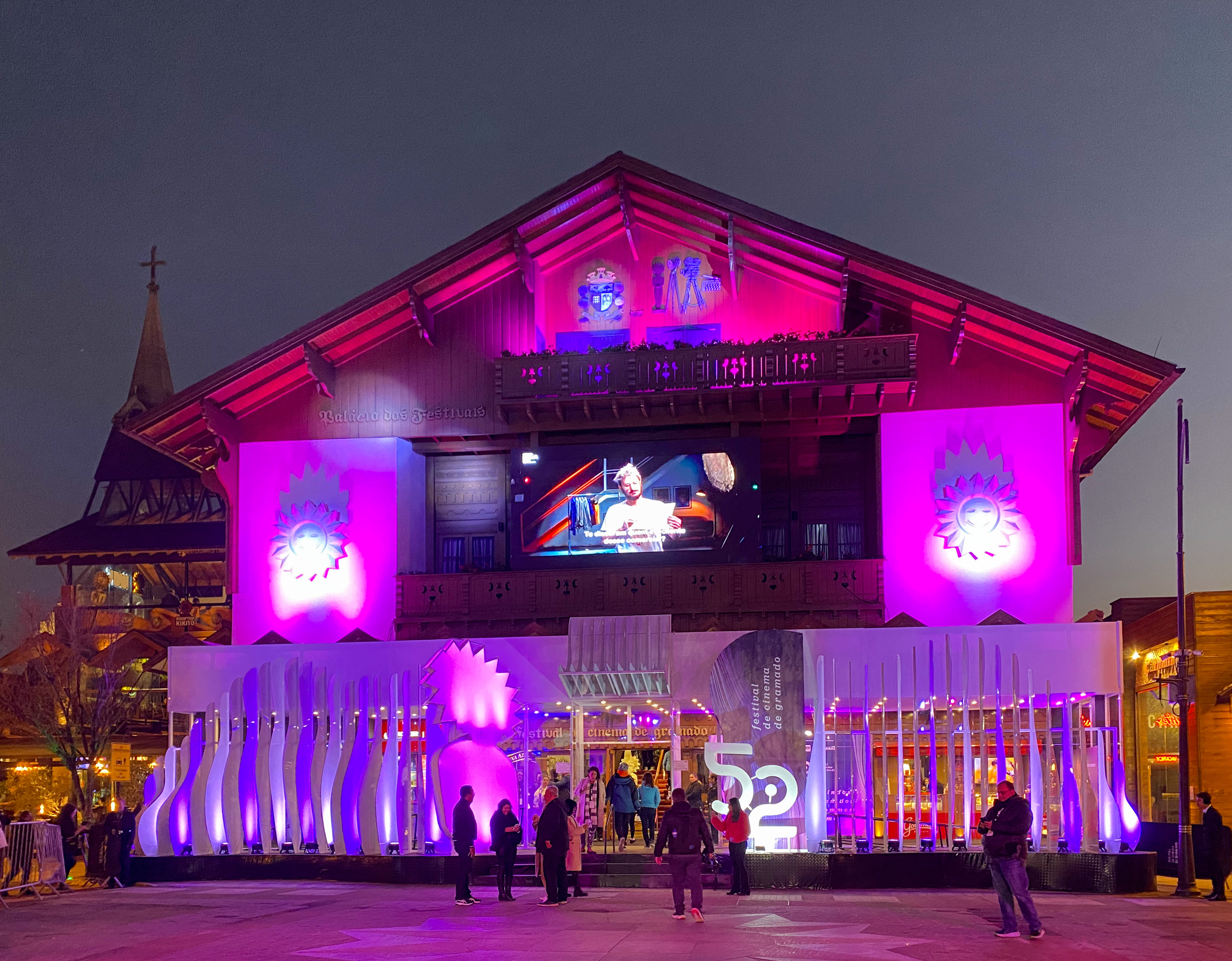
Gramado Film Festival, the biggest film festival in the country

The Brazilian film industry began in the late 19th century, during the early days of the Belle Époque. While there were national film productions during the early 20th century, American films such as Rio the Magnificent were made in Rio de Janeiro to promote tourism in the city. The films Limite (1931) and Ganga Bruta (1933), the latter being produced by Adhemar Gonzaga through the prolific studio Cinédia, were poorly received at release and failed at the box office, but are acclaimed nowadays and placed among the finest Brazilian films of all time. The 1941 unfinished film It's All True was divided into four segments, two of which were filmed in Brazil and directed by Orson Welles; it was originally produced as part of the United States' Good Neighbor policy during Getúlio Vargas' Estado Novo.

During the 1960s, the Cinema Novo movement rose to prominence with directors such as Glauber Rocha, Nelson Pereira dos Santos, Paulo César Saraceni and Arnaldo Jabor. Glauber Rocha's films Black God, White Devil (1964) and Entranced Earth (1967) are considered to be some of the greatest and most influential in Brazilian film history. Rocha won the Best Director Award at the 1969 Cannes Film Festival for Antonio das Mortes and the 1977 Special Jury Prize for Best Short Film for Di.

During the 1990s, Brazil saw a surge of critical and commercial success with films such as O Quatrilho (Fábio Barreto, 1995), O Que É Isso, Companheiro? (Bruno Barreto, 1997) and Central do Brasil (Walter Salles, 1998), all of which were nominated for the Academy Award for Best Foreign Language Film, the latter receiving a Best Actress nomination for Fernanda Montenegro. The 2002 crime film City of God, directed by Fernando Meirelles, was critically acclaimed, scoring 90% on Rotten Tomatoes, being placed in Roger Ebert's Best Films of the Decade list and receiving four Academy Award nominations in 2004, including Best Director. Notable film festivals in Brazil include the São Paulo and Rio de Janeiro International Film Festivals and the Gramado Festival.

The film I'm Still Here, directed by Walter Salles, was nominated for Best Actress (Torres) and Best Picture at the 97th Academy Awards, and won Best International Feature Film, becoming the first-ever Brazilian produced film to win an Academy Award. The film The Secret Agent had its world premiere at the main competition of the 2025 Cannes Film Festival on 18 May 2025, where it won the Best Actor prize for Wagner Moura, the Best Director prize for Mendonça and the FIPRESCI Prize. It received further widespread critical acclaim.

=== Media ===
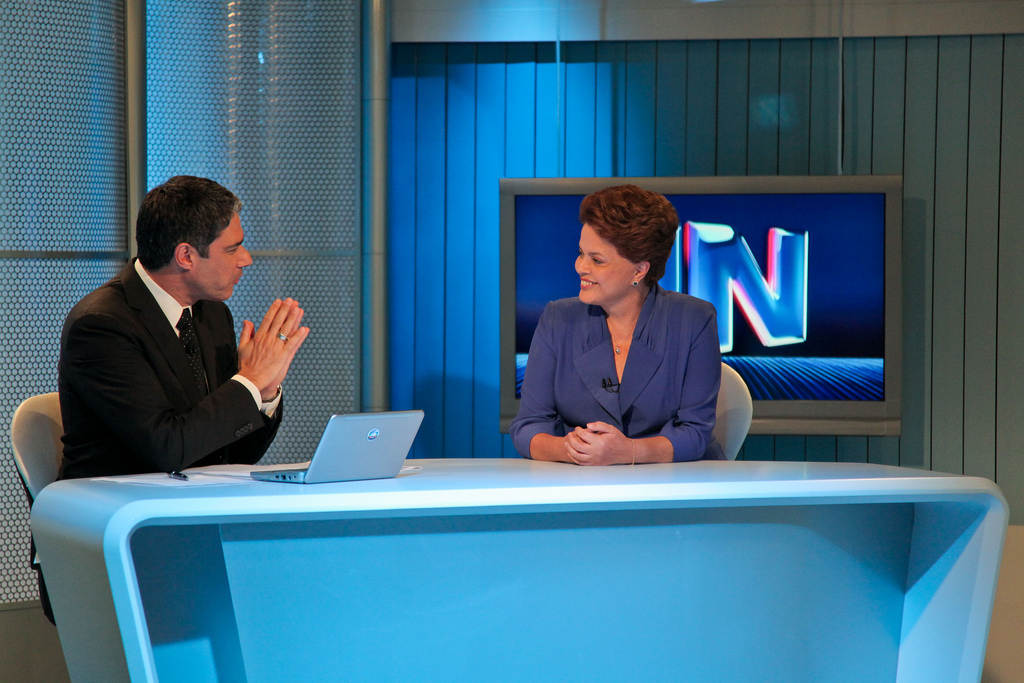
Former President Dilma Rousseff at Jornal Nacional news program. Rede Globo is the world's second-largest commercial television network.

The Brazilian press was officially born in Rio de Janeiro on 13 May 1808 with the creation of the Royal Printing National Press by the Prince Regent John. The Gazeta do Rio de Janeiro, the first newspaper published in the country, began to circulate on 10 September 1808. The largest newspapers nowadays are Folha de S.Paulo, O Globo, and O Estado de S. Paulo.

Radio broadcasting began on 7 September 1922, with a speech by then President Epitácio Pessoa, and was formalized on 20 April 1923 with the creation of the "Radio Society of Rio de Janeiro". Television in Brazil began officially on 18 September 1950, with the founding of TV Tupi by Assis Chateaubriand. Since then, television has grown in the country, creating large commercial broadcast networks such as Globo, SBT, RecordTV, Bandeirantes and RedeTV.

By the mid-1960s, Brazilian universities had installed mainframe computers from IBM and Burroughs Large Systems. In the 1970s and 1980s, the Brazilian government restricted foreign imports to protect the local manufacturing of computers. In the 1980s, Brazil produced half of the computers sold in the country. By 2009, the mobile phone and Internet use in Brazil was the fifth largest in the world. As of early 2025, internet penetration in Brazil stood at 86.2% of the total population (183 million individuals), and the ratio of cellular mobile connections to the total population was 102% (217 million active connections).

In May 2010, the Brazilian government launched TV Brasil Internacional, an international television station, initially broadcasting to 49 countries. Commercial television channels broadcast internationally include Globo Internacional, RecordTV Internacional and Band Internacional.

=== Cuisine ===
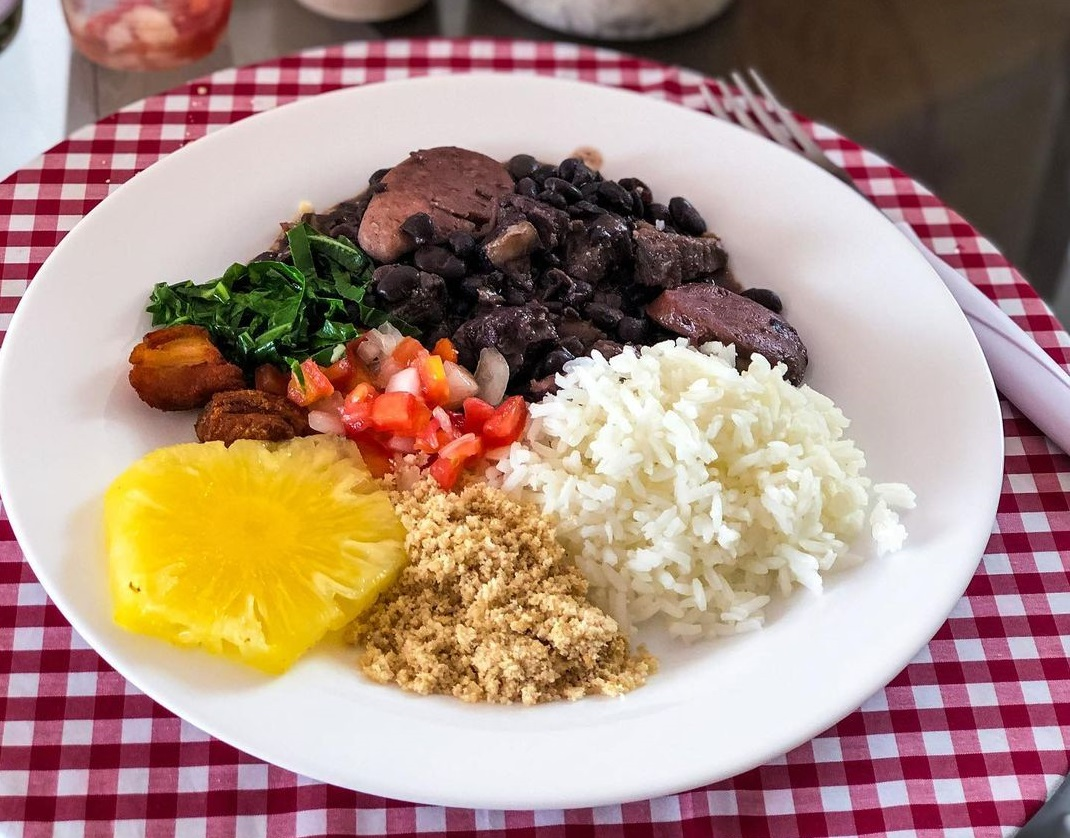
Feijoada is the national dish of Brazilian cuisine.

Brazilian cuisine varies greatly by region, reflecting the country's varying mix of indigenous and immigrant populations. This has created a national cuisine marked by the preservation of regional differences. Some of the most well known Brazilian foods are the feijoada, considered the country's national dish; and churrasco, a kind of barbecue which is often served in rodízio style. Other regional foods include beijú, feijão tropeiro, vatapá, moqueca, polenta (from Italian cuisine) and acarajé (from African cuisine). The national beverage is coffee; cachaça is Brazil's native liquor. Cachaça is distilled from sugar cane and is the main ingredient in the national cocktail, Caipirinha.

A typical meal consists mostly of rice and beans with beef, salad, french fries and a fried egg. Often, it is mixed with cassava flour (farofa). Fried potatoes, fried cassava, fried banana, fried meat and fried cheese are very often eaten in lunch and served in most typical restaurants. Popular snacks are pastel (a fried pastry); coxinha (a variation of chicken croquete); pão de queijo (cheese bread and cassava flour / tapioca); pamonha (corn and milk paste); esfirra (a variation of Lebanese pastry); kibbeh (from Arabic cuisine); and empada (pastry), little salt pies filled with shrimps or heart of palm.

Brazil has a variety of desserts such as brigadeiros (chocolate fudge balls), bolo de rolo (roll cake with goiabada), cocada (a coconut sweet), beijinhos (coconut truffles and clove) and Romeu e Julieta (cheese with goiabada). Peanuts are used to make paçoca, rapadura and pé de moleque. Local common fruits such as açaí, cupuaçu, mango, papaya, cocoa, cashew, guava, orange, lime, passionfruit, pineapple, and hog plum are turned into juices and used to make chocolates, ice pops and ice cream.

=== Sports ===
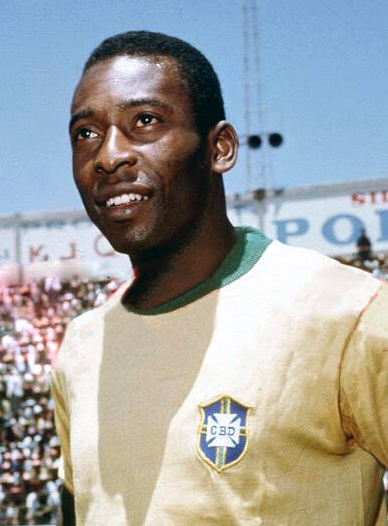
Pelé, a footballer as well as sport figure of the 20th century

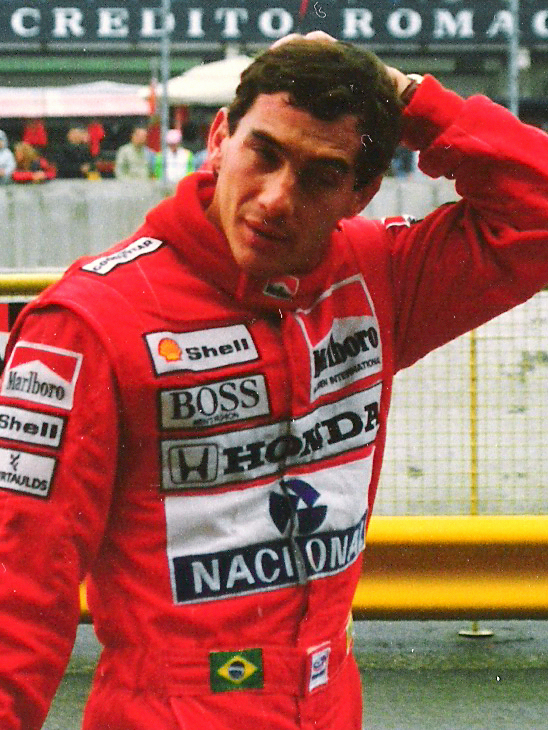
Ayrton Senna, the driver with most consecutive wins and pole positions at the same Grand Prix of Formula One

The most popular sport in Brazil is football. The Brazilian men's national team is ranked among the best in the world according to the FIFA World Rankings, and has won the World Cup tournament a record five times.

Volleyball, basketball, auto racing and martial arts also have large audiences. The Brazil men's national volleyball team currently holds the titles of the World League, World Grand Champions Cup, World Championship and the World Cup. In auto racing, three Brazilian drivers have won the Formula One world championship eight times. The country has also produced significant achievements in other sports such as sailing, swimming, tennis, surfing, skateboarding, MMA, gymnastics, boxing, judo, athletics and table tennis.

Some sport variations have their origins in Brazil: beach football, futsal (indoor football) and footvolley emerged in Brazil as variations of football. In martial arts, Brazilians developed Capoeira, Vale tudo and Brazilian jiu-jitsu.

Brazil has hosted several high-profile international sporting events, such as the 1950 FIFA World Cup, and recently has hosted the 2014 FIFA World Cup, 2019 Copa América and 2021 Copa América. The São Paulo circuit, Autódromo José Carlos Pace, hosts the annual Grand Prix of Brazil. São Paulo organized the IV Pan American Games in 1963, and Rio de Janeiro hosted the XV Pan American Games in 2007. On 2 October 2009, Rio de Janeiro was selected to host the 2016 Olympic Games and 2016 Paralympic Games, making it the first South American city to host the games and second in Latin America, after Mexico City. Furthermore, the country hosted the FIBA Basketball World Cups in 1954 and 1963. At the 1963 event, the Brazil national basketball team won one of its two world championship titles.

== See also ==
- Outline of Brazil

== Bibliography ==
- Azevedo, Aroldo. O Brasil e suas regiões. São Paulo: Companhia Editora Nacional, 1971
- Barman, Roderick J. Citizen Emperor: Pedro II and the Making of Brazil, 1825–1891. Stanford: Stanford University Press, 1999. ISBN 0-8047-3510-7
- Biscardi, Afrânio; Rocha, Frederico Almeida (May 2006), "O Mecenato Artístico de D. Pedro II e o Projeto Imperial", 19&20 – A revista eletrônica de DezenoveVinte, vol. I, no. 1
- Boxer, Charles R. The Portuguese Seaborne Empire (1969)
  - O império marítimo português 1415–1825. São Paulo: Companhia das Letras, 2002. ISBN 85-359-0292-9
- Bueno, Eduardo. Brasil: uma História. São Paulo: Ática, 2003. ISBN 85-08-08213-4
- Calmon, Pedro. História da Civilização Brasileira. Brasília: Senado Federal, 2002
- Carvalho, José Murilo de. D. Pedro II. São Paulo: Companhia das Letras, 2007
- Coelho, Marcos Amorim. Geografia do Brasil. 4th ed. São Paulo: Moderna, 1996
- Diégues, Fernando. A revolução brasílica. Rio de Janeiro: Objetiva, 2004
- Enciclopédia Barsa. Volume 4: Batráquio – Camarão, Filipe. Rio de Janeiro: Encyclopædia Britannica do Brasil, 1987
- Ermakoff, George (2006). Rio de Janeiro – 1840–1900 – Uma crônica fotográfica (in Portuguese). Rio de Janeiro: G. Ermakoff Casa Editorial. ISBN 978-85-98815-05-3.
- Fausto, Boris and Devoto, Fernando J. Brasil e Argentina: Um ensaio de história comparada (1850–2002), 2nd ed. São Paulo: Editoria 34, 2005. ISBN 85-7326-308-3
- Gaspari, Elio. A ditadura envergonhada. São Paulo: Companhia das Letras, 2002. ISBN 85-359-0277-5
- Janotti, Aldo. O Marquês de Paraná: inícios de uma carreira política num momento crítico da história da nacionalidade. Belo Horizonte: Itatiaia, 1990
- Lyra, Heitor. História de Dom Pedro II (1825–1891): Ascenção (1825–1870). v. 1. Belo Horizonte: Itatiaia, 1977
- Lyra, Heitor. História de Dom Pedro II (1825–1891): Declínio (1880–1891). v. 3. Belo Horizonte: Itatiaia, 1977
- Lustosa, Isabel. D. Pedro I: um herói sem nenhum caráter. São Paulo: Companhia das letras, 2006. ISBN 85-359-0807-2
- Moreira, Igor A. G. O Espaço Geográfico, geografia geral e do Brasil. 18. Ed. São Paulo: Ática, 1981
- Munro, Dana Gardner. The Latin American Republics; A History. New York: D. Appleton, 1942.
- Peres, Damião (1949) O Descobrimento do Brasil por Pedro Álvares Cabral: antecedentes e intencionalidade Porto: Portucalense.
- Scheina, Robert L. Latin America: A Naval History, 1810–1987. Annapolis, MD: Naval Institute Press, 1987. ISBN 0-87021-295-8
- Schwarcz, Lilia (1998). As barbas do imperador: D. Pedro II, um monarca nos trópicos (in Portuguese). São Paulo: Companhia das Letras. ISBN 978-85-7164-837-1. LCCN 99885599. OL 142027M. Wikidata Q18238040.
- Stuart B. Schwartz Sovereignty and Society in Colonial Brazil (1973)
  - Early Latin America (1983)
  - Sugar Plantations in the Formation of Brazilian Society (1985)
- Skidmore, Thomas E. Brazil: Five Centuries of Change (Oxford University Press, 1999)
  - Uma História do Brasil. 4th ed. São Paulo: Paz e Terra, 2003. ISBN 85-219-0313-8
- Souza, Adriana Barreto de. Duque de Caxias: o homem por trás do monumento. Rio de Janeiro: Civilização Brasileira, 2008. ISBN 978-85-200-0864-5.
- Wright, Simon. 1992. Villa-Lobos. Oxford and New York: Oxford University Press. ISBN 0-19-315475-7
- Vainfas, Ronaldo. Dicionário do Brasil Imperial. Rio de Janeiro: Objetiva, 2002. ISBN 85-7302-441-0
- Vesentini, José William. Brasil, sociedade e espaço – Geografia do Brasil. 7th Ed. São Paulo: Ática, 1988
- Vianna, Hélio. História do Brasil: período colonial, monarquia e república, 15th ed. São Paulo: Melhoramentos, 1994
- Zirin, Dave. Brazil's Dance with the Devil: The World Cup, The Olympics, and the Fight for Democracy Haymarket Books 2014. ISBN 978-1-60846-360-2
