= Nexo (disambiguation) =

Nexø is a town on the Baltic island of Bornholm, Denmark.

Nexo or Nexø may also refer to:

== Automobiles ==
- Hyundai Nexo, Hydrogen powered fuel cell crossover SUV

== Companies ==
- Nexo Capital Incorporated, cryptocurrency financial services company
- Nexo Jornal, Brazilian news website

== Entertainment ==
- Nexo Knights, Lego theme (2015–2018) and TV series (2015–2017)

== People ==
- Martin Andersen Nexø (born 1869–1954), Danish writer and one of the authors in the Modern Breakthrough movement in Danish literature

== Places ==
- Bornholm Butterfly Park, also known as Nexø Butterfly Park, zoo in western outskirts of Nexø, Bornholm, Denmark
- Martin-Andersen-Nexö-Gymnasium Dresden, school in Dresden, Germany
- Nexø Church, parish church of Nexø, Bornholm, Denmark
- Nexø Museum, town museam in Nexø, Bornholm, Denmark
- Nexø Stadion, football stadium in Nexø, Bornholm, Denmark

== Sport ==
- Nexø Boldklub Bornholm, football club in Nexø, Bornholm, Denmark
- Scottish Championship (golf), also known as Nexo Championship, golf tournament in Scotland
