= Bornholm Railway Museum =

Railway museum in Denmark

Coordinates: 55°03′59″N 15°08′07″E

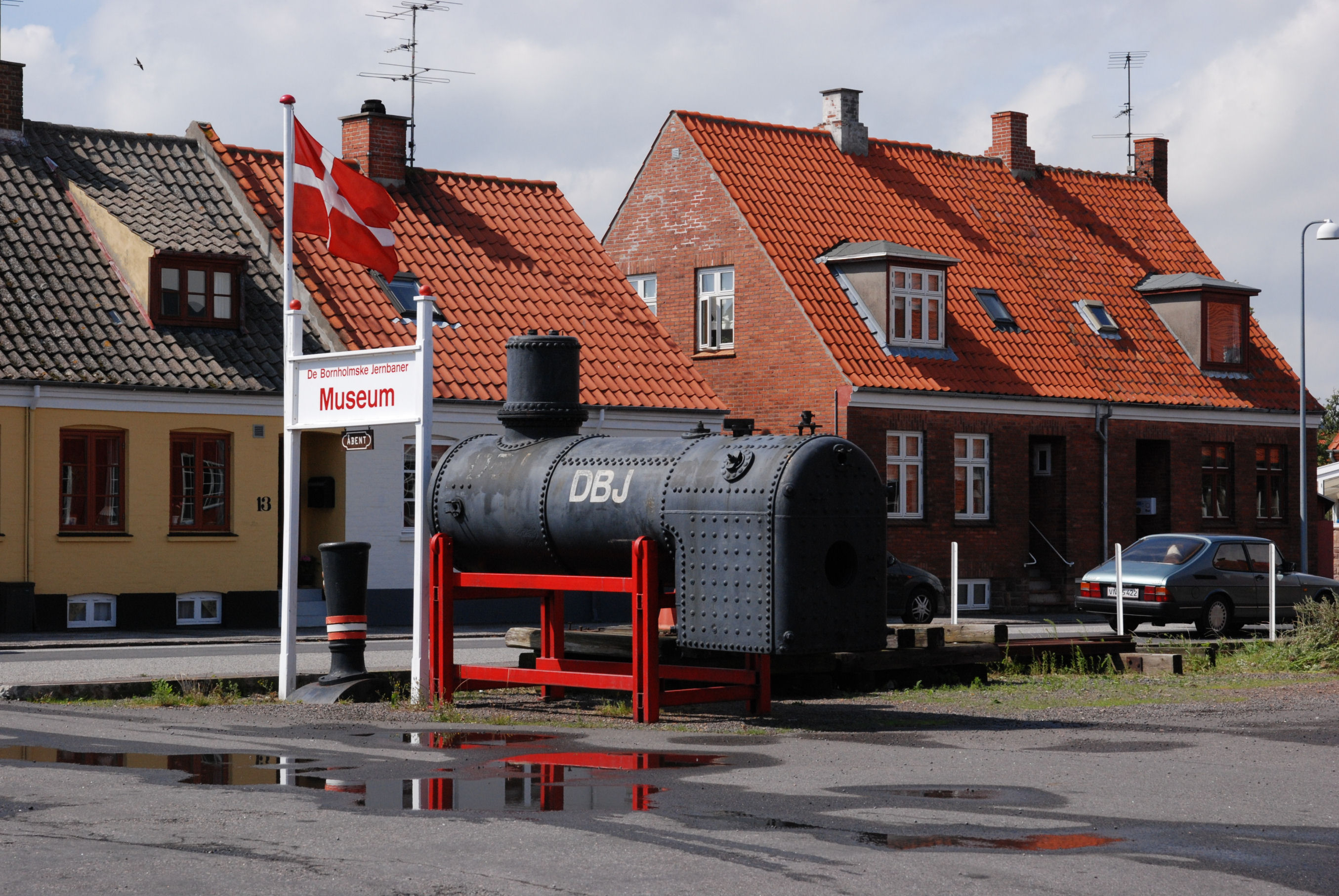
Bornholm Railway Museum, Nexø

The Bornholm Railway Museum (Danish: De Bornholmske Jernbaner Museum) is a museum in Nexø on the Danish island of Bornholm documenting the island's railways which operated from 1900 to 1968. Located in the harbour area of the town, it has put together an exhibition representing the look of an old Bornholm station. Of particular interest is DBJ No. 26, a mail car and the only remaining Bornholm railway carriage.

The museum is housed in a large wooden building on the harbour side, once the premises of the boat building company, Nexø Både. In 1999, Nexø Museum and Foreningen De Bornholmske Jernbaner (Bornholm Railway Association) completed comprehensive renovation of the site in order to create an exhibition on Toget og Havnen (Train and Harbour).

The museum is open from June to mid-September: 10 am to 4 pm on Tuesdays and Thursdays and 10 am to 2 pm on Saturdays.
