= Lilia Moritz Schwarcz =

Brazilian anthropologist and publisher

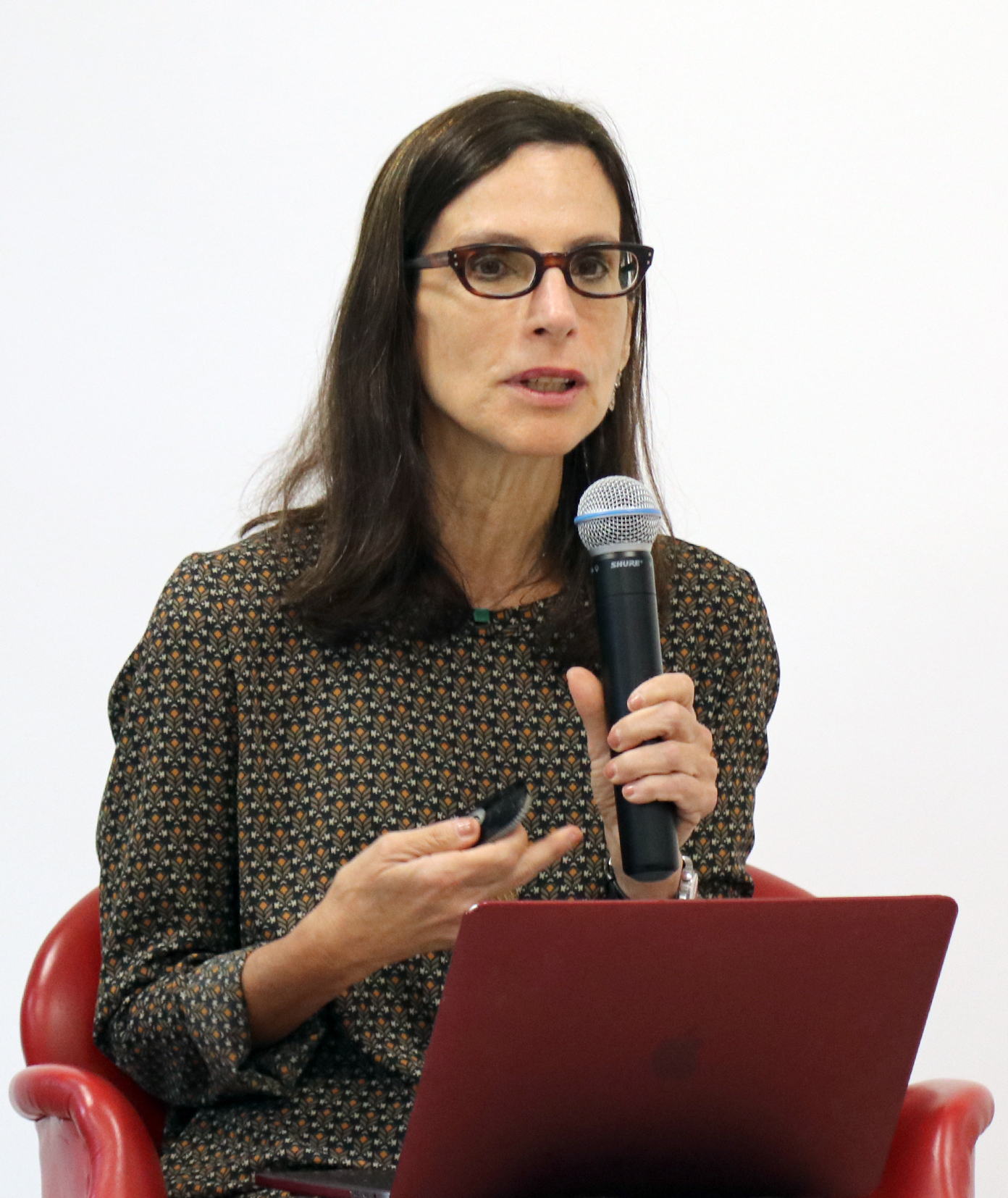
- Born: Lilia Katri Moritz Schwarcz; São Paulo, SP, Brazil
- Education: Universidade de São Paulo

Lilia Katri Moritz Schwarcz is a Brazilian historian and anthropologist. She is a doctor in social anthropology at the University of São Paulo, full professor at the Faculdade de Filosofia, Letras e Ciências Humanas in the same institution, and visiting professor (Global Scholar) at Princeton University.

Her main fields of study are anthropology and history of 19th-century Brazil, focusing on the Brazilian Empire, social identity, slavery and race relations between White and Afro-Brazilian peoples.

Schwarcz is Jewish. In 1986, she co-founded the Companhia das Letras publishing house with her husband Luis Schwarcz. She is a curator for the São Paulo Museum of Art, and writes a column at the news website Nexo Jornal.

In 2024, Lilia was elected to occupy seat number 9 of the Academia Brasileira de Letras (ABL).

== Bibliography ==
- Retrato em branco e negro: jornais, escravos e cidadãos em São Paulo no fim do século XIX. Companhia das Letras, 1987. ISBN 8585095180
- *O espetáculo das raças. Companhia das Letras. 1993. p. 287. ISBN 85-7164-329-6. (English edition: The spectacle of the races. Hill & Wang. 1999. p. 358. ISBN 9780809087891.)
- As Barbas do Imperador (English edition:The Emperor's Beard: Dom Pedro II and His Tropical Monarchy in Brazil. Hill and Wang, 2003. ISBN 9780809042197)
- O Império em Procissão - Zahar, 2000. ISBN 9788537806531
- A Longa Viagem da Biblioteca dos Reis - Do terremoto de Lisboa à Independência do Brasil. Companhia das Letras, 2002. ISBN 8535902880
- O Sol do Brasil: Nicolas-Antoine Taunay e as Desventuras Dos Artistas Franceses na Corte de D. João 1816-1821. Companhia das Letras, 2008. ISBN 9788535911855 - Prêmio Jabuti - Melhor Biografia 2009
- D. João Carioca - A corte portuguesa chega ao Brasil 1808-1821. Companhia das Letras, 2008. ISBN 9788535911206
- Um enigma chamado Brasil (Org. com André Botelho). Companhia das Letras, 2009. ISBN 8535915494 - Prêmio Jabuti - Ciências Sociais 2010
- Agenda brasileira (Org. com André Botelho). Companhia das Letras, 2011. ISBN 9788535918748
- História do Brasil Nação Vol. 3 - A abertura para o mundo 1889-1930 (Org. do volume e Diretora da Coleção). Objetiva, 2012. ISBN 9788539003860
- Nem preto nem branco, muito pelo contrário. Claro Enigma (Companhia das Letras), 2012. ISBN 9788581660233
- A batalha do Avaí - a beleza da barbárie: a Guerra do Paraguai pintada por Pedro Américo. Rio de Janeiro, Sextante. 2013. ISBN 9788575429969
- Brasil: uma Biografia (co-written with Heloisa Murgel Starling). Companhia das Letras. 2015. ISBN 9788535925661 (English edition: Brazil, a Biography. Penguin Books, 2018)
- Lima Barreto: Triste Visionário. Companhia das Letras, 2017. ISBN 9788535929133
- Dicionário da Escravidão e Liberdade (organizer, with Flávio dos Santos Gomes). Companhia das Letras, 2018.
