= Nexø Parish =

Parish in Bornholm Municipality, Denmark

Nexø Parish Nexø Sogn
- Parish
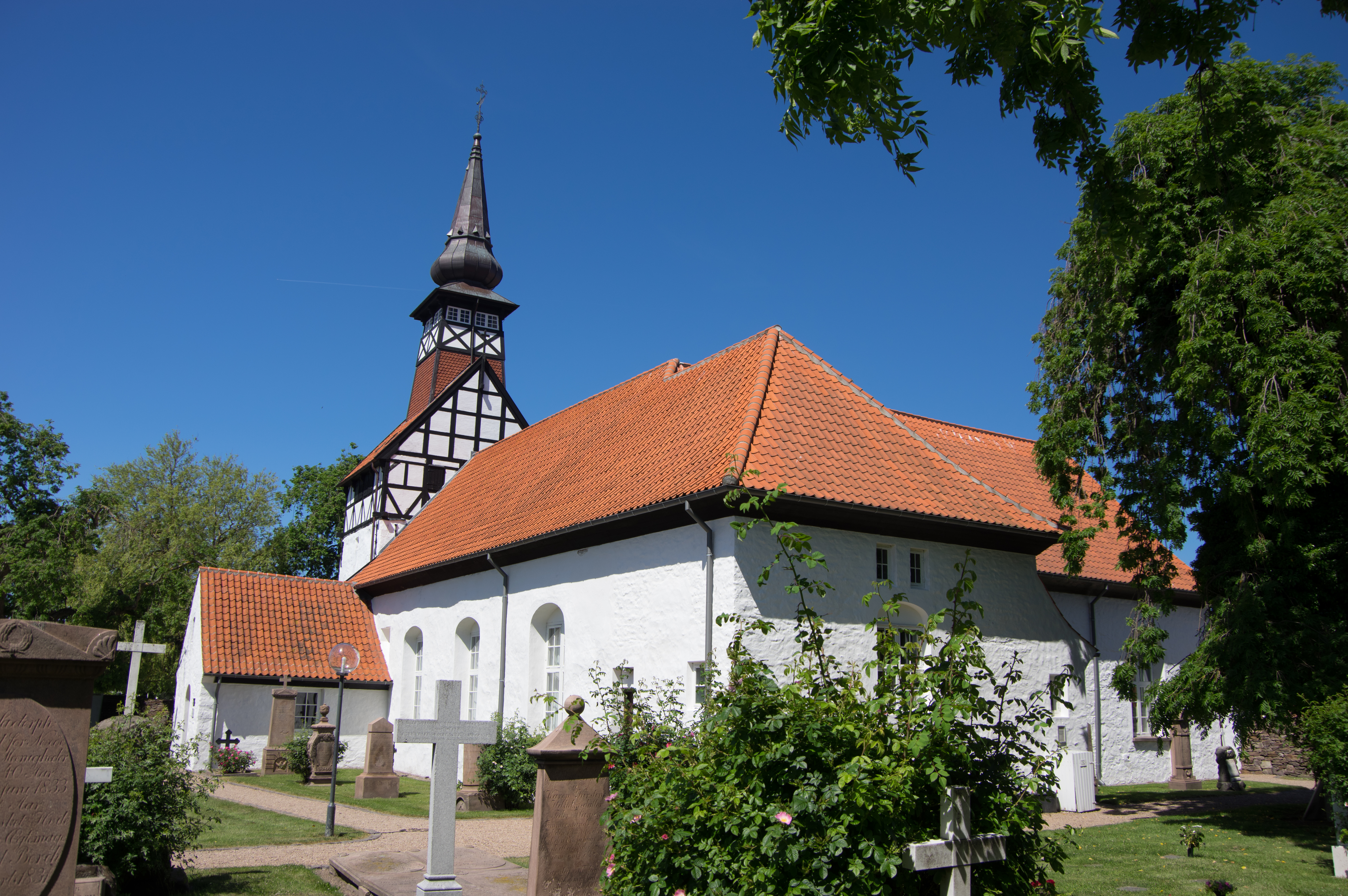
- Nexø Church

- The parish within Bornholm Municipality
- Country: Denmark
- Region: Capital
- Municipality: Bornholm Municipality
- Diocese: Copenhagen

Population (2025)
  - Total: 3,679
- Parish number: 7571

Nexø Parish (Danish: Nexø Sogn) is a parish in the Diocese of Copenhagen in Bornholm Municipality, Denmark. The parish contains the town of Nexø.
