= Antoni Trenchev =

Bulgarian politician

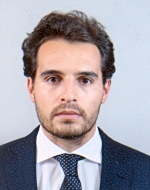
- Born: Antoni Antoniev Trenchev; March 15, 1987 (age 39); Munich, Germany
- Known for: Former Member of the National Assembly of the Republic of Bulgaria
- Title: Co-founder of Nexo
- Website: www.antonitrenchev.com

Antoni Trenchev (born March 15, 1987) is a politician and cryptocurrency businessperson who is a former Member of the National Assembly of the Republic of Bulgaria. He is a co-founder of the Cayman Islands-based cryptocurrency firm Nexo with Kosta Kantchev.

== Early life ==
Antoni Antoniev Trenchev was born on March 15, 1987, in Munich, Germany.

Trenchev studied finance law at King’s College London and Humboldt University of Berlin. After college, he worked in the hedge fund industry before turning his attention to financial technology.

== Political career ==
Trenchev was elected to the National Assembly of the Republic of Bulgaria in 2014, serving until 2017, where he sat with the Reformist Bloc party. His committee work included sitting on the European Affairs and Oversight of the European Funds Committee, Committee on Supervision of the Committee on Energy and Water Regulation, and several ad hoc committees. He was also deputy head of the Delegation to the Parliamentary Assembly of the Council of Europe. In the Council of Europe, he served on the Committee on Social Affairs, Health and Sustainable Development in 2015, Sub-Committee on relations with the OECD and the EBRD from 2015 to 2016, the Committee on Political Affairs and Democracy from 2015 to 2017, and an alternative on the Committee on Social Affairs, Health and Sustainable Development during the same period.

== Cryptocurrency business ==
Trenchev is the managing partner at the cryptocurrency lender Nexo. He has promoted his company in various news outlets. In January 2023 Nexo was fined $45 million by the Securities and Exchange Commission for offering an unregistered securities product. The company agreed to pay the fine without admitting or denying the results of the investigation. In April 2025, Nexo organized an event with Donald Trump Jr. and announced the company's intention to return to the U.S. market. In July 2025, Nexo sponsored a golf event a Donald Trump-owned golf a course. A few weeks later, Donald Trump and Trenchev met to discuss a "joint vision for crypto in the U.S." Reportedly, Nexo paid $10 million to sponsor events at Donald Trump's golf course in Scotland.
