= Snogebæk =

- Town
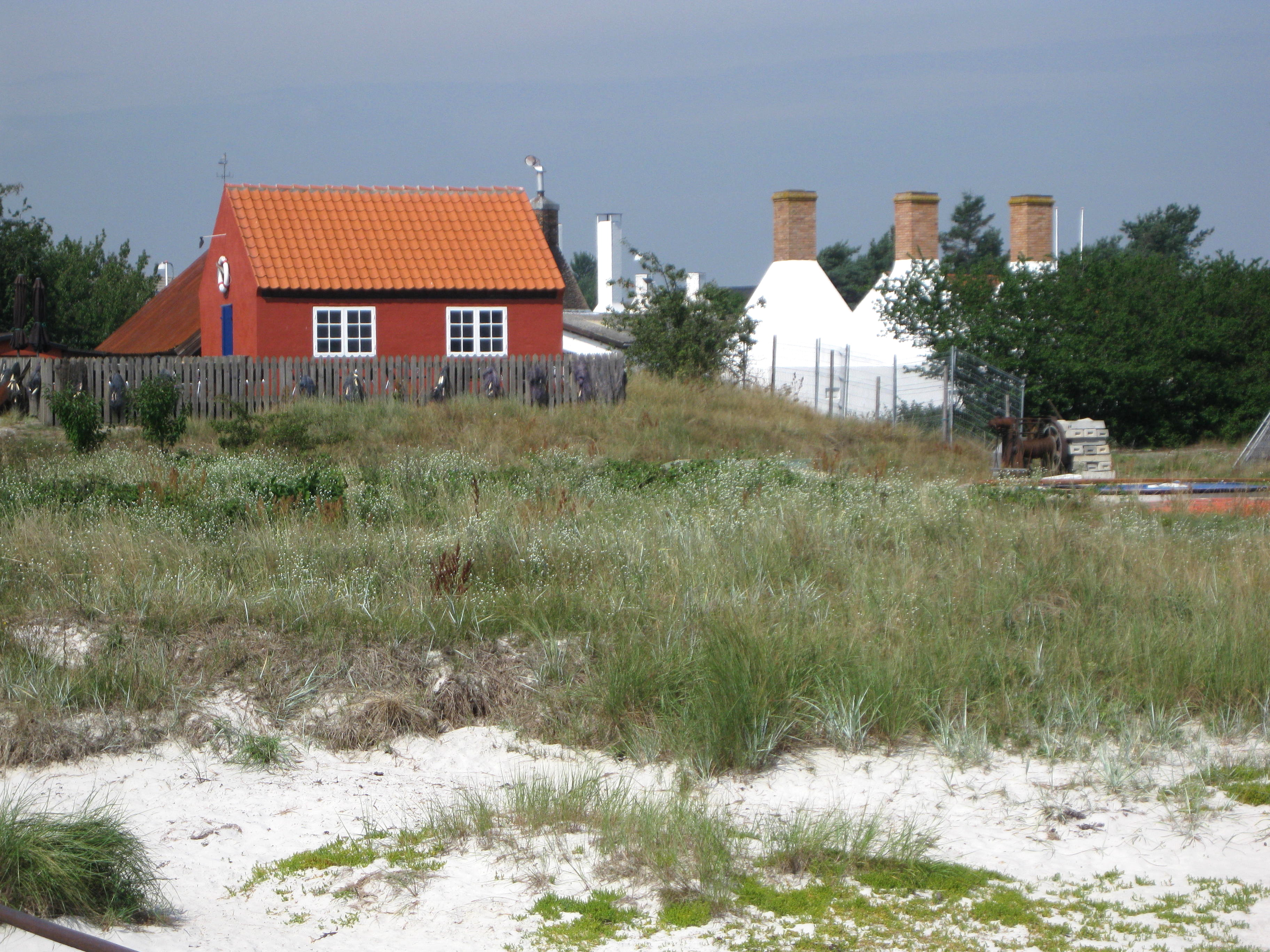
- Snogebæk's smokehouse restaurant

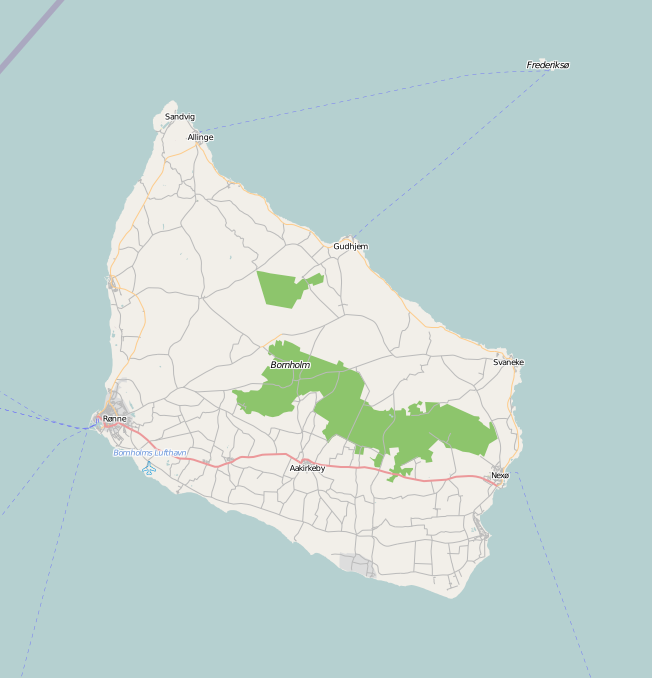
- Location on Bornholm
- Coordinates: 55°01′35″N 15°07′05″E
- Country: Denmark
- Region: Capital (Hovedstaden)
- Municipality: Bornholm

Population (2026)
  - Total: 676
- Time zone: UTC+1 (CET)
  - Summer (DST): UTC+2 (CEST)

Snogebæk is a fishing village and tourist resort in the south-east of the Danish island of Bornholm some 5 km south of Nexø with a population of 676 (1 January 2026). It shares a fine sandy beach with neighbouring Balka.

== History ==
The first written references to Snogebæk date from 1555 but it is thought the area has been inhabited since the Middle Ages. Originally it probably consisted of a few dispersed smallholdings providing a living from farming and fishing. The first harbour was built on the coast by the fishermen in 1869 but it soon filled up with sand. In 1889, thanks to the success of Bornholm's Armager development, a new island harbour was completed, connected to the shore by a wooden footbridge some 100 meters long. Yachting harbour facilities were added later. The community expanded in the 19th century when new homes sprang up between the farmhouses. In the 1920s, after summerhousess were added to the north and south, tourist facilities developed around the harbour. More recently, detached houses have been built to the west. Tourists are also attracted by the fishing village atmosphere, the sandy beach and the local restaurants which include a large smokehouse which is something of a landmark.

== Harbour fête ==
Since 1973, annual celebrations have been held in Snogebæk, initially to provide funding for improvements to the community. Despite a number of difficulties, in 1988 the festivities were expanded with the participation of the local inhabitants who arranged competitive sporting activities. By the 1990s, music and singing came along, presented by both local and national artists, supplemented later by a jazz band. The celebrations soon developed into a mini music festival with audiences of some 2,500 listening to the Lars Lilhold Band. Recently the three-day event has attracted over 8,000 visitors with the participation of Fi-Fi Dong, Robbie Williams Jam, Havz Jazz and Valentinos dance orchestra.
