= As Barbas do Imperador =

Biography of Dom Pedro II, second and last emperor of Brazil

- Author: Lilia Moritz Schwarcz
- Language: Portuguese
- Subject: Dom Pedro II
- Published: 1998
- Publisher: Companhia das Letras
- Publication place: Brazil
- Awards: Prêmio Jabuti
- ISBN: 978-85-7164-837-1
- OCLC: 948105598

As Barbas do Imperador – D. Pedro II, um monarca nos trópicos (The Emperor's Beard: Dom Pedro II and His Tropical Monarchy in Brazil in English) is a non-fiction biography book written by Brazilian historian Lilia Moritz Schwarcz about the life and reign of Dom Pedro II, from his birth to his death. The book won the Prêmio Jabuti in 1999.
