= Balka =

- Village
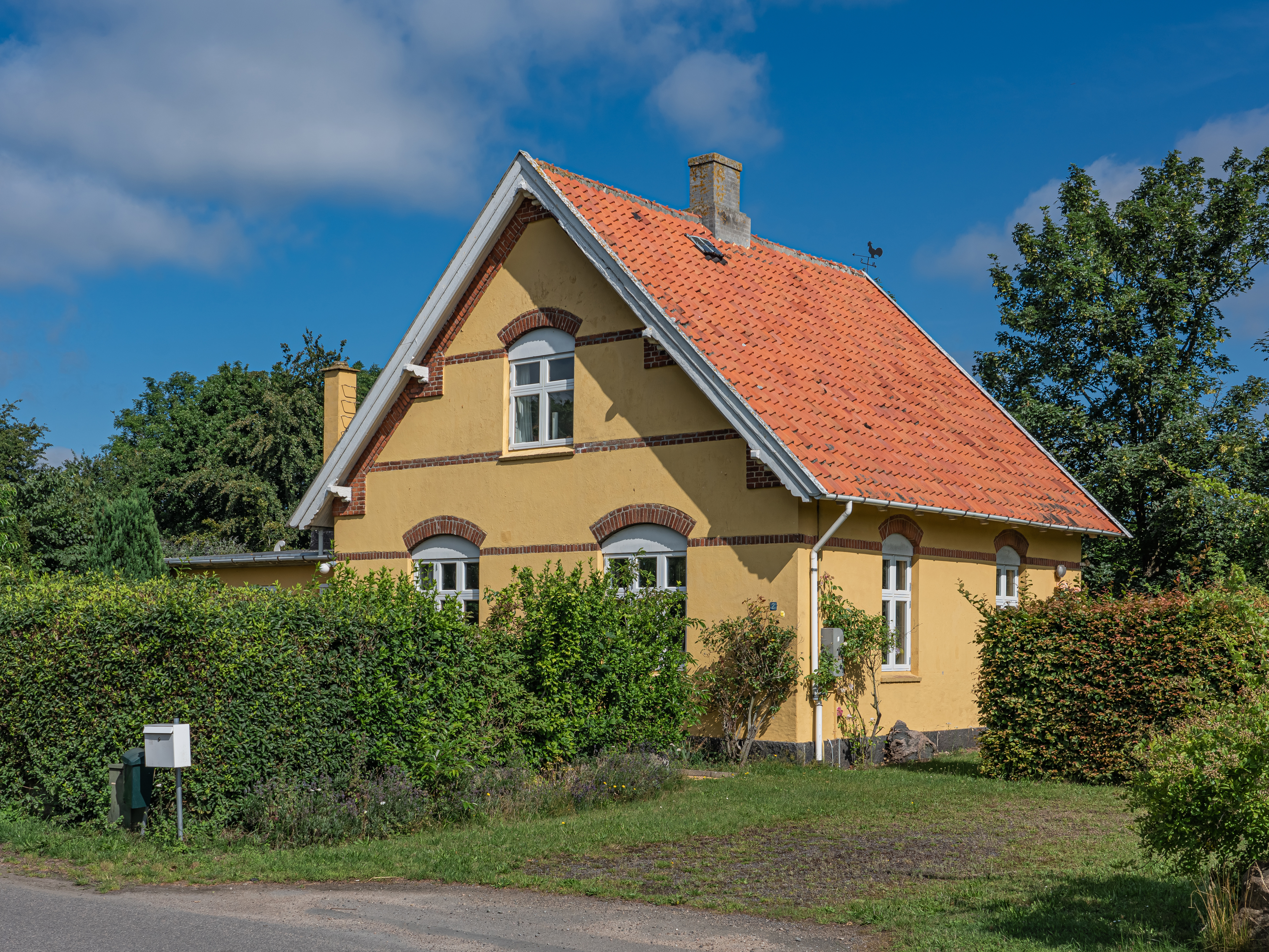
- Kannikegård Station, Bornholm

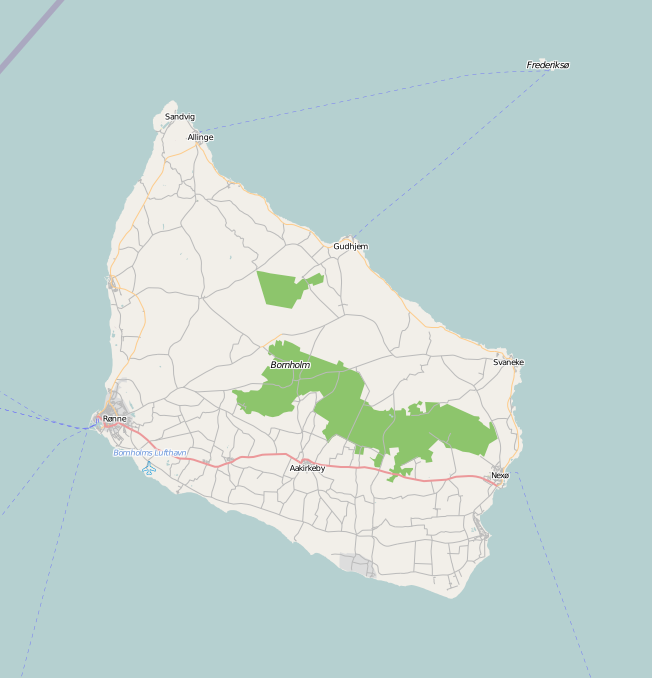
- Location on Bornholm
- Coordinates: 55°02′27″N 15°06′17″E
- Country: Denmark
- Region: Capital (Hovedstaden)
- Municipality: Bornholm

Population (2022)
  - Total: 200
- Time zone: UTC+1 (CET)
  - Summer (DST): UTC+2 (CEST)

Balka, also Balke, is a village and seaside resort midway between Nexø and Snogebæk on the southwest coast of the Danish island of Bornholm. As of 2022, it has a population of 200. It is best known for its wide beach with fine white sand.

== Etymology ==
The current name "Balka" ending with an A is incorrect as the locality was originally called "Balke" as can be seen on Bernhard Frantz Hammer's map from 1746. The original name stems from the sea sweeping up banks of sandstone fragments known as "balke". "Balk" comes from the Old Norse "balkr" and is used in modern Danish to denote a boundary between two fields. The sandstone banks known as "Balke Udmark" have now been largely destroyed by quarrying and construction.

== History ==
The community grew up around the station on the railway from Rønne to Nexø (1900–1968). Designed by Joachim Fagerlund in 1919, it was initially called Balke Station but became Balka Station in 1935. After a halt called Balka Strand came in 1935, Balka Station was renamed Kannikegård Station in 1945. It is now a private house on No. 2 Birkevej. The old railway line from Balka Strand to Nexø has now been converted into a cycle track.

== The beach ==
Balka Beach (Danish: Balka Strand) is Bornholm's best beach for children. The fine sand from the sandstone rocks of neighbouring Nexø has filled Balke Bay and formed low sand-dunes. The construction of the little harbour for small boats to the north has however caused swirling currents to deposit seaweed in and around the harbour. Similarly, the large boulders deposited on the beach while building summer houses on the dunes has caused the sand to be washed away.

== The village today ==
Balka, a residential village, is often considered in connection with Snogebæk just to the south. It is dominated by summer houses and hotels which bring tourists to the area. The inhabitants use Nexø's shops and services. The area around the harbour and the beach is particularly attractive.

== Surroundings ==
Balke Lyng 25 hectares (62 acres) to the north is Northern Europe's easternmost heather-covered heath. It is also one of the few places where the green-winged orchid can be seen. The common tern also frequents the area. The 600 metres (2,000 ft) long defensive entrenchment is the island's longest. Behind it, there is a graveyard from the early Iron Age where the graves appear to have been made of wood.

A short distance inland from Balka, the Hundsemyre bird sanctuary attracts in particular the penduline tit and the great cormorant.
