= Nexo (company) =

Cryptocurrency exchange

Nexo Capital Incorporated
- Type: Private company
- Industry: Cryptocurrency, Financial technology
- Founded: 2018
- Founders: Antoni Trenchev; Kosta Kantchev
- Area served: Worldwide
- Products: Cryptocurrency exchange Crypto-backed credit lines Interest-bearing accounts Payment card
- Number of employees: c. 600 (2025)
- Website: nexo.com

Nexo Capital Incorporated is a digital asset platform offering services to earn interest on, borrow against, trade and spend cryptocurrency. Its services include crypto-backed credit lines, fixed and flexible savings products, a cryptocurrency exchange and a payment card.

Nexo was founded in 2018 by Antoni Trenchev and Kosta Kantchev. The company states it is active in over 200 jourisdictions and has more than 10 million clients.

== History ==
Nexo was founded in 2018 by Antoni Trenchev and Kosta Kantchev.

The company initially operated a cryptocurrency lending platform that allowed users to borrow fiat currencies and stablecoins using digital assets as collateral. The NEXO token was also introduced during this period.

In 2019, Nexo reported processing more than $1.5 billion in transactions and expanded its lending services to include financing secured by cryptocurrency holdings and real estate.

In 2020, Nexo introduced its "Earn on Crypto" product, which allowed users to earn interest on certain digital assets and fiat holdings, and introduced a tiered loyalty programme. The company reported reaching one million registered users in 2020.

In 2021, Nexo introduced an in-app cryptocurrency exchange and expanded its institutional services through partnerships with Ledger Vault and Fidelity Digital Assets.

In 2022, Nexo launched the Nexo Card in Europe in partnership with Mastercard. The card used digital assets held as collateral and was expanded to support both debit and credit functionality in 2023.

Nexo also launched Nexo Pro, an institutional services division, and introduced a platform for spot and margin trading.

In 2022, the company established Nexo Ventures, a $150 million investment fund focused on Web3 companies. Nexo later stated that the fund had invested in more than 40 companies.

Between 2023 and 2024, Nexo introduced Nexo Private, a service for high-net-worth clients, and obtained SOC 2 Type II and ISO certifications relating to data security, privacy and cloud services. The company subsequently began describing its services as a digital asset wealth platform rather than primarily as a cryptocurrency lending business.

In December 2025, Nexo acquired Argentine cryptocurrency platform Buenbit. The acquisition was intended to support the company's operations in Argentina, Peru and Mexico, with Buenos Aires designated as its regional headquarters. In 2026, Nexo introduced the dual-mode Nexo Card in Argentina.

Nexo also reorganized its operations in the European Economic Area in connection with the European Union's Markets in Crypto-Assets Regulation (MiCAR), partnering with German-regulated companies Tangany for digital asset custody and DLT Finance for brokerage and trading services.

In February 2026, Nexo resumed operations in the United States after a three-year absence, providing trading, lending, and cryptocurrency exchange services through infrastructure supplied by Bakkt.

== Products ==
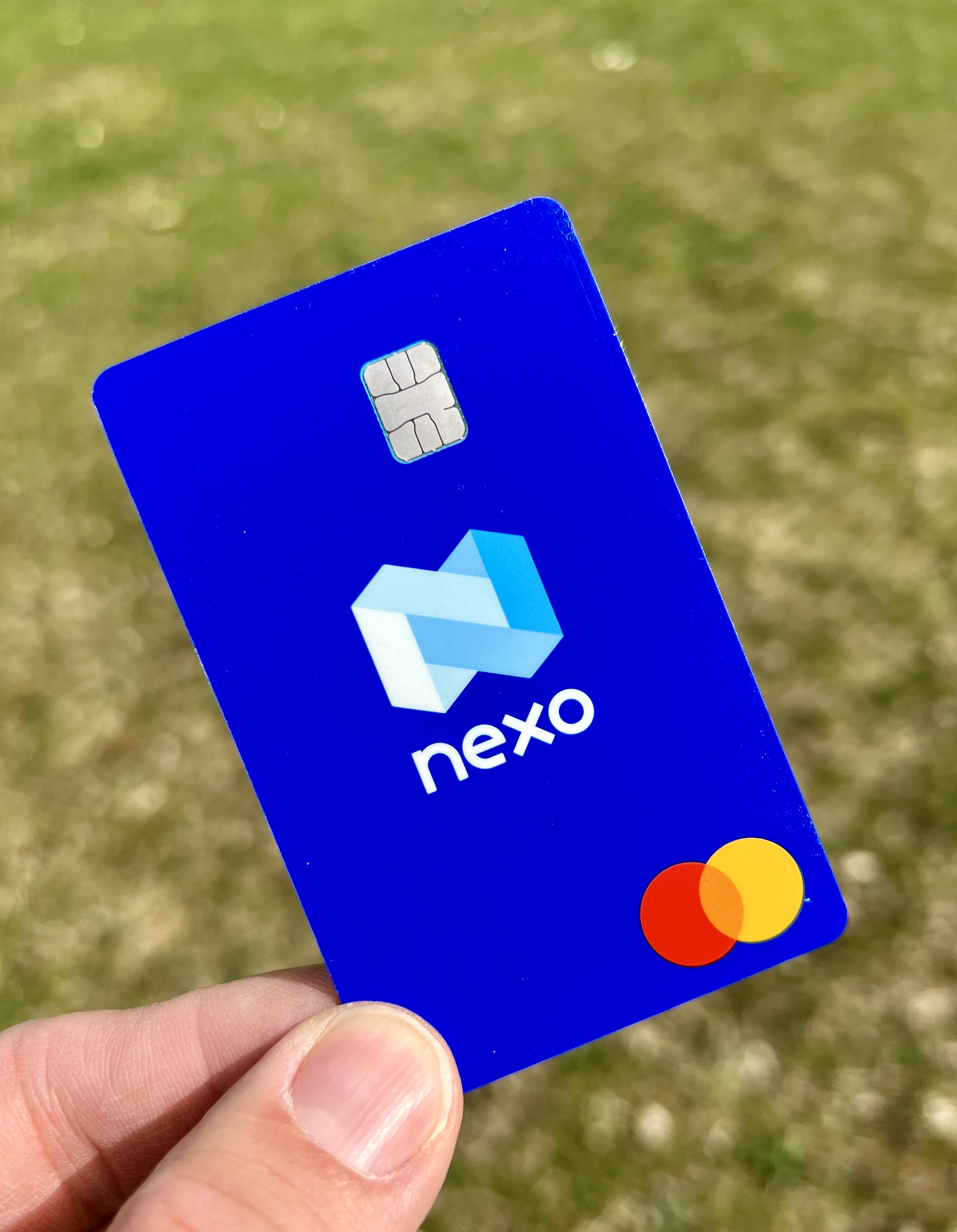
Nexo credit card

The company offers trading for over 100 cryptocurrencies. They also offer a loan service that allows users to borrow cryptocurrencies. Its crypto credit lines let users borrow fiat currency or stablecoins against their digital assets without selling them. In 2026 the company introduced Zero-interest Credit lines for bitcoin and ether.

Nexo's yield programs offer fixed-term and flexible interest-bearing accounts for cryptocurrencies and major fiat currencies. According to the company, the platform supports spot trading in more than 100 digital assets. It also offers perpetual futures with leverage of up to 100x. For merchants, it offers a payment gateway.

A debit or credit card issued by Mastercard can be requested. If the card is a debit card, it sells the user's cryptocurrency; if not, it loans it. The Nexo Card, developed with Mastercard, has dual debit and credit functionality and can be used at point-of-sale terminals.

== Licensing and regulatory status ==
In Argentina, Nexo operates as a registered virtual asset service provider (VASP) with the National Securities Commission (CNV), following its acquisition of Buenbit.

In Australia, it is registered with the Australian Transaction Reports and Analysis Centre (AUSTRAC) for digital currency exchange services.

In the EEA, Nexo partners with Tangany, licensed under MiCAR, which provides digital asset custody. DLT Finance, licensed under MiCAR and authorized under MiFID II, provides brokerage and trading infrastructure.

In the United Kingdom, Nexo serves clients under the Financial Conduct Authority's (FCA) financial promotions regime through Gateway 21, an FCA-authorized approver.

In the United States, Nexo re-entered the market in February 2026 using trading infrastructure provided by Bakkt.

== Partnerships and sponsorships ==
In January 2026 Nexo signed a multi-year partnership with the Audi Revolut F1 Team, becoming its inaugural Official Digital Asset Partner ahead of Audi's entry into Formula One.

In December 2025, it signed a multi-year partnership with Tennis Australia, becoming the Official Crypto Partner of the Australian Open and the Summer of Tennis. The deal includes branding of the on-court Nexo Coaches Pod.

Nexo is title sponsor of the ATP 500 Dallas Open under a multi-year agreement starting in 2026. It is also Official Crypto Partner of the Abierto Mexicano Telcel in Acapulco and the Mifel Tennis Open in Los Cabos. In golf, Nexo is Official Marketing Partner and Official Digital Wealth Platform of the DP World Tour for 2025–2027. This includes title sponsorship of the Nexo Championship in Scotland.

== Legal disputes ==
In September 2022, regulatory agencies in eight U.S. states filed enforcement actions against Nexo, alleging that its Earn Interest Product (EIP) operated as an unregistered security. In December 2022, Nexo announced a phased exit from the U.S. market. In January 2023, Nexo settled charges with the U.S. Securities and Exchange Commission (SEC) and state regulators coordinated by the North American Securities Administrators Association (NASAA), agreeing to pay $45 million in penalties without admitting or denying the findings. On February 16, 2026, after three years out of the US market, Nexo relaunched its services there in partnership with Bakkt.

In January 2023, the company's premises in Sofia were searched by Bulgarian authorities. In December 2023, Bulgarian prosecutors terminated the proceedings due to a lack of evidence of illegal conduct. In January 2024, Nexo filed a $3 billion claim against the Republic of Bulgaria at the World Bank's International Centre for Settlement of Investment Disputes (ICSID), citing damages resulting from the dropped investigation.
