= Nexø =

- Town
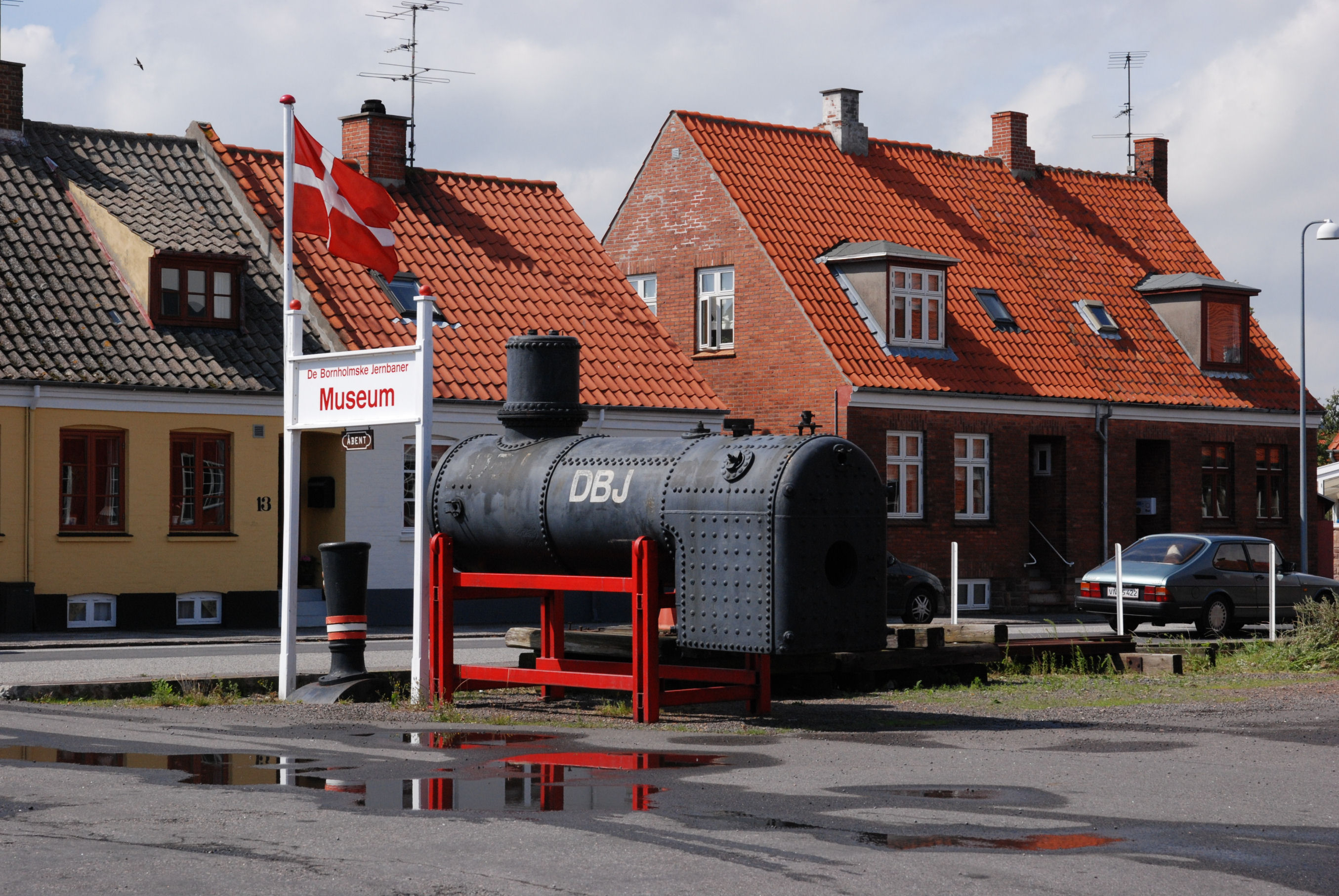
- Railway museum in Nexø

- Coat of arms

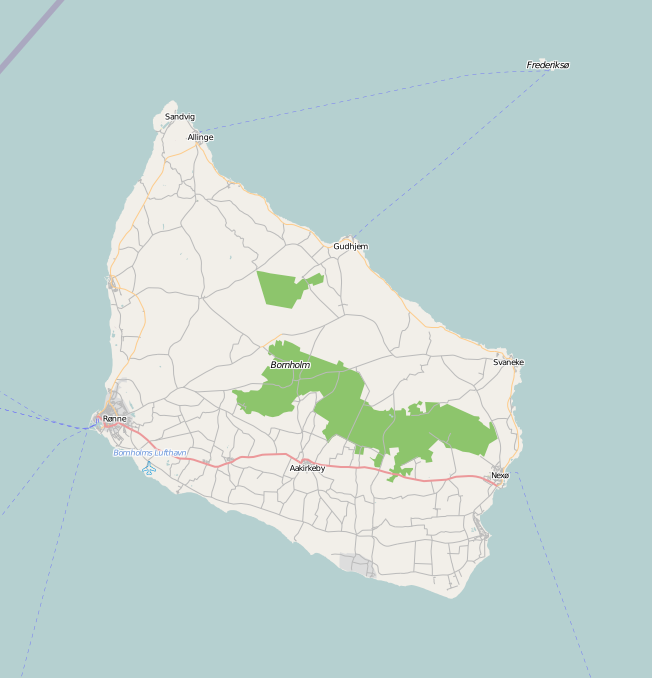
- Location on Bornholm Nexø (Denmark)
- Coordinates: 55°03′N 15°07′E
- Country: Denmark
- Region: Capital (Hovedstaden)
- Municipality: Bornholm
- Parish: Nexø

Area
  - Urban: 2.21 km^{2} (0.85 sq mi)

Population (2026)
  - Urban: 3,645
  - Urban density: 1,650/km^{2} (4,270/sq mi)
- Demonym: Nexøbo
- Time zone: UTC+1 (CET)
  - Summer (DST): UTC+2 (CEST)

Nexø, sometimes spelled Neksø, is a town on the east coast of the Baltic island of Bornholm, Denmark. With a population of 3,645 (as of 1 January 2026), it is the second largest town, as well as the largest fishing port on the island. Fishing was previously the mainstay of the town's economy. Nexø is also the site of a distillery (Bornholmske Spiritfabrik ApS) and a mustard factory (Bornholmersennep ApS). The town is also a port of call for the passenger ferries linking Bornholm with Kołobrzeg in Poland. Dueodde, the largest beach on Bornholm, is located south of Nexø, in the southeastern corner of the island.

== Etymology ==
"Nexø" is possibly a combination of the Old Norse elements "nøkke", meaning Nix or water spirit, and "sæ" (sea). It was first documented in 1346 as Nexe.

== History ==
Nexø originated as a fishing village for the parish of Bodilsker with a chapel attached to St Bodil's Church. In 1346, it was granted rights as a market town, dealing in both the herring trade and in agricultural products. Over the centuries the town has suffered a number of disasters. The Lübeckers burned the town in 1510, in 1563 most of the inhabitants died from the plague and in 1645 it was plundered by 500 Swedish soldiers. In 1756 there was another serious fire and in 1872 a storm damaged the harbour.

Around 1800, the town became Bornholm's administrative centre. In 1806, 21 ships and 47 boats were registered with Nexø as their home port. In 1879, a new harbour basin was completed and, in 1892, Denmark's first communal drydock was opened. There were a number of subsequent extensions to the harbour facilities. The 19th century also saw the development of ship building, the foundation of an iron foundry (1864) and of the Østbornholmske Dampskibsselskab (East Bornholm Steamship Company) which operated a regular service to Copenhagen from 1877.

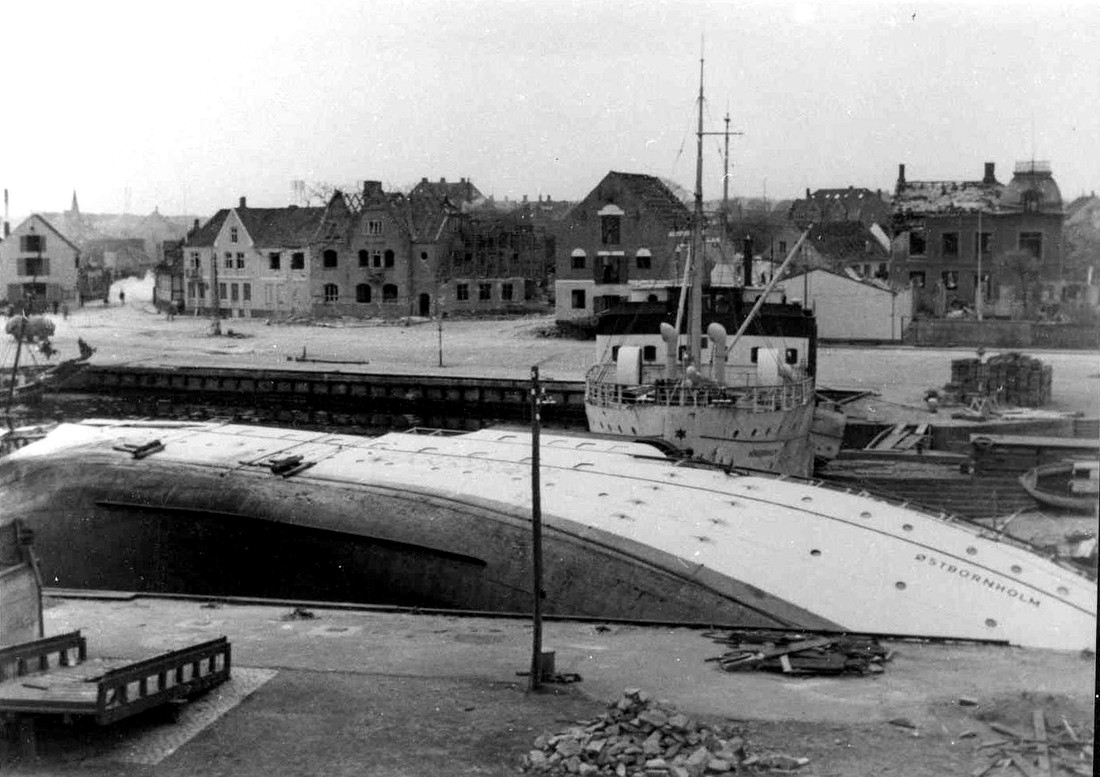
Nexø harbour in May 1945, after the Soviet air raid

At the end of World War II, on 7 and 8 May 1945, Nexø (like Rønne) was bombed by Soviet aircraft when Gerhard von Kamptz, the commander of the German forces occupying Bornholm, refused to surrender, causing total destruction of the town centre on the harbour and the main square. To ease the ensuing housing problem, the Swedish State donated 175 wooden houses to the town. The Soviets had alerted the civilian population in advance, therefore the air raid only resulted in ten fatalities. Although the rest of Denmark had been liberated on 4 May, the Red Army occupied Bornholm from 9 May 1945 to 5 April 1946, when an agreement was reached with the Danish authorities and the island finally came under Danish rule once more.

Between 1900 and 1968, a railway connected Nexø with Rønne, the island's largest town. The old station building at Rønne is still preserved, whilst Nexø is now host to a railway museum. The former Nexø Municipality (1970–2002) covered an area of 104 km^{2} (40 sq mi) with a population of 8,558, but is now included in Bornholm Municipality. The Hyundai Nexo is named after the city.

== Landmarks ==
Nexø Church, dating back to the late Middle Ages, stands out with its half-timbered tower and copper spire. In the 18th century, it was enlarged as a result of Nexø's prosperity from exporting fish and sandstone to Copenhagen. It has recently been renovated and redecorated.

Nexø Museum in the harbour area is housed in a historic sandstone building from 1796 which was the town hall until 1856 when it was replaced with a new building in Købmagergade. Around 1890, an extra storey was added. The museum opened in 1970. Exhibitions include coverage of the German occupation, the Soviet bombing and occupation after the war. There are documents and artefacts from Nexø's earlier businesses, including its sandstone quarry and the old brewery. The Bornholm Railway Museum recreates the atmosphere of an old station with exhibits from Bornholm's railways which operated from 1900 to 1968. Of particular interest is a renovated mail car.

Nexø is home to Bornholm Butterfly Park where over a thousand brightly coloured butterflies fly around in a former hothouse.

== The town today ==
The town is centred on the harbour and the shopping area. Activity in the harbour area has increasingly moved away from fish processing to be replaced by new businesses, stores, and restaurants. Retail businesses in Nexø have benefitted from a growing number of tourists from the summer house developments to the south as well as from a reduction in facilities in the surrounding villages. There is a pleasant shopping area between the central square and the harbour. Nexø's services include a large school, library, an old people's home and various sports facilities.

== Surrounding area ==
To the south of Nexø there are the beach resorts of Balka, Snogebæk and Dueodde, all famous for their fine white sand. Snogebæk has an attractive little harbour area while Dueodde is home to the island's tallest lighthouse.

== Twin towns ==
- Kołobrzeg, Poland
- Darłowo, Poland

== Gallery ==
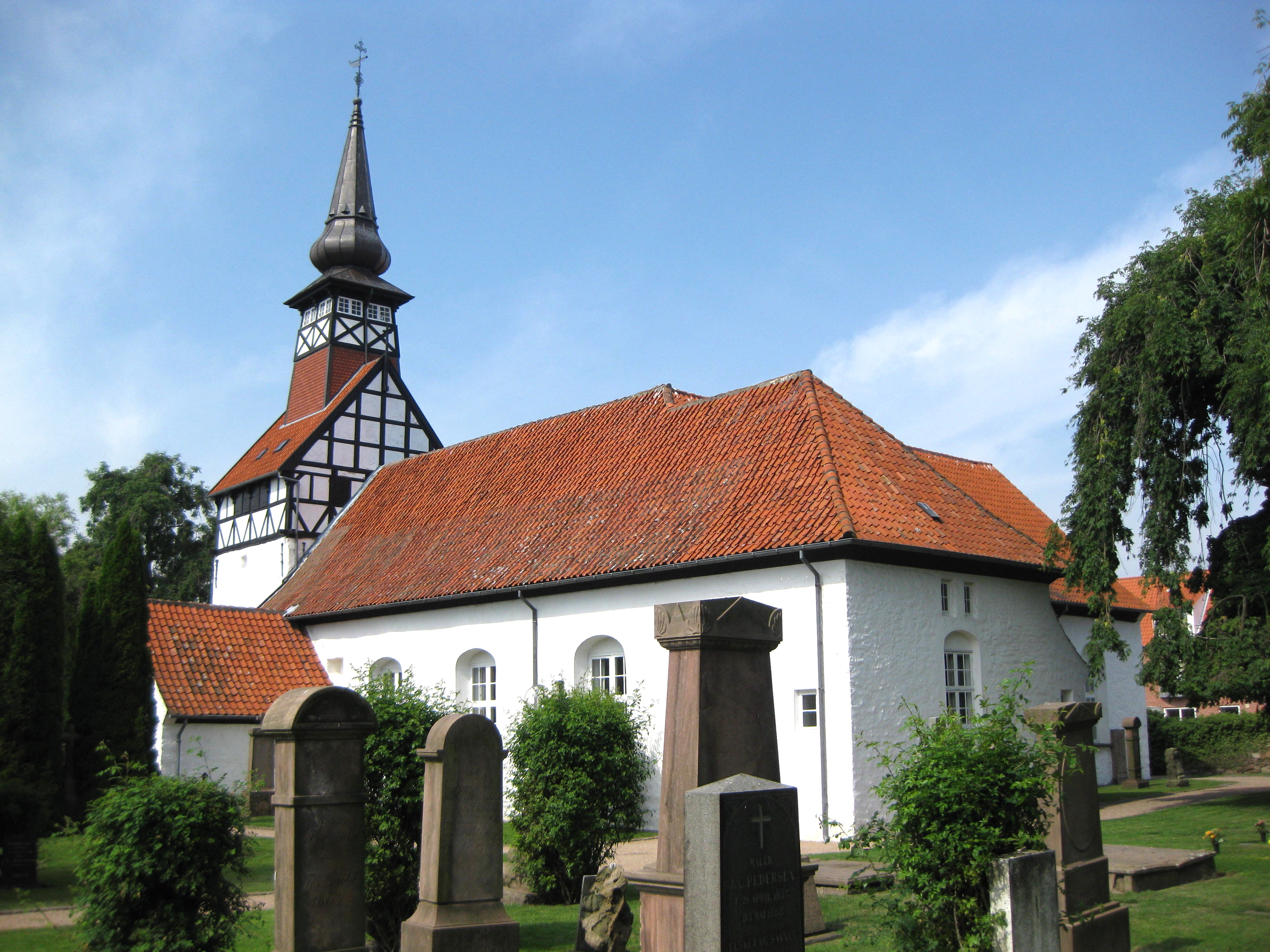
Nexø Church

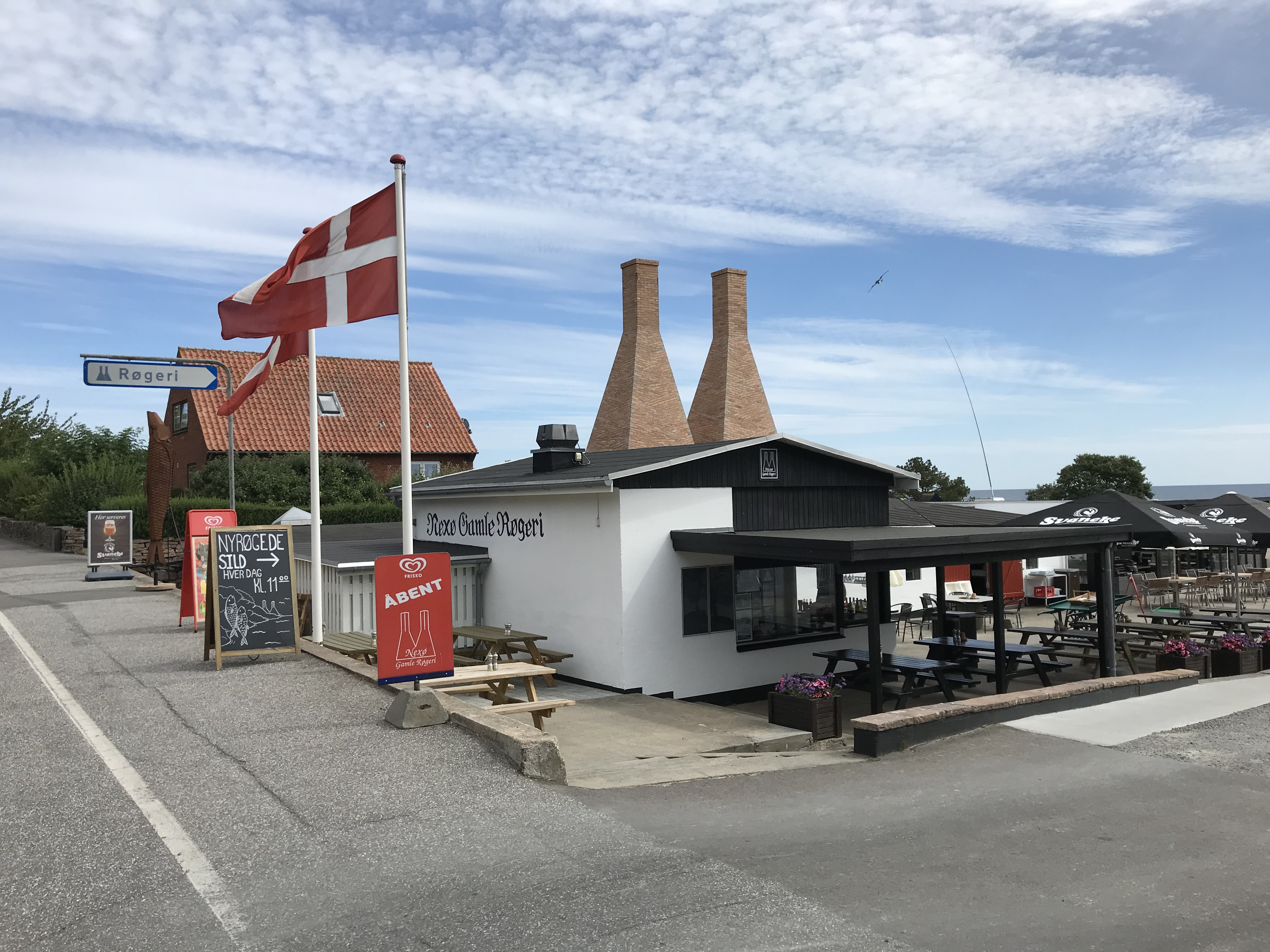
The old smokehouse

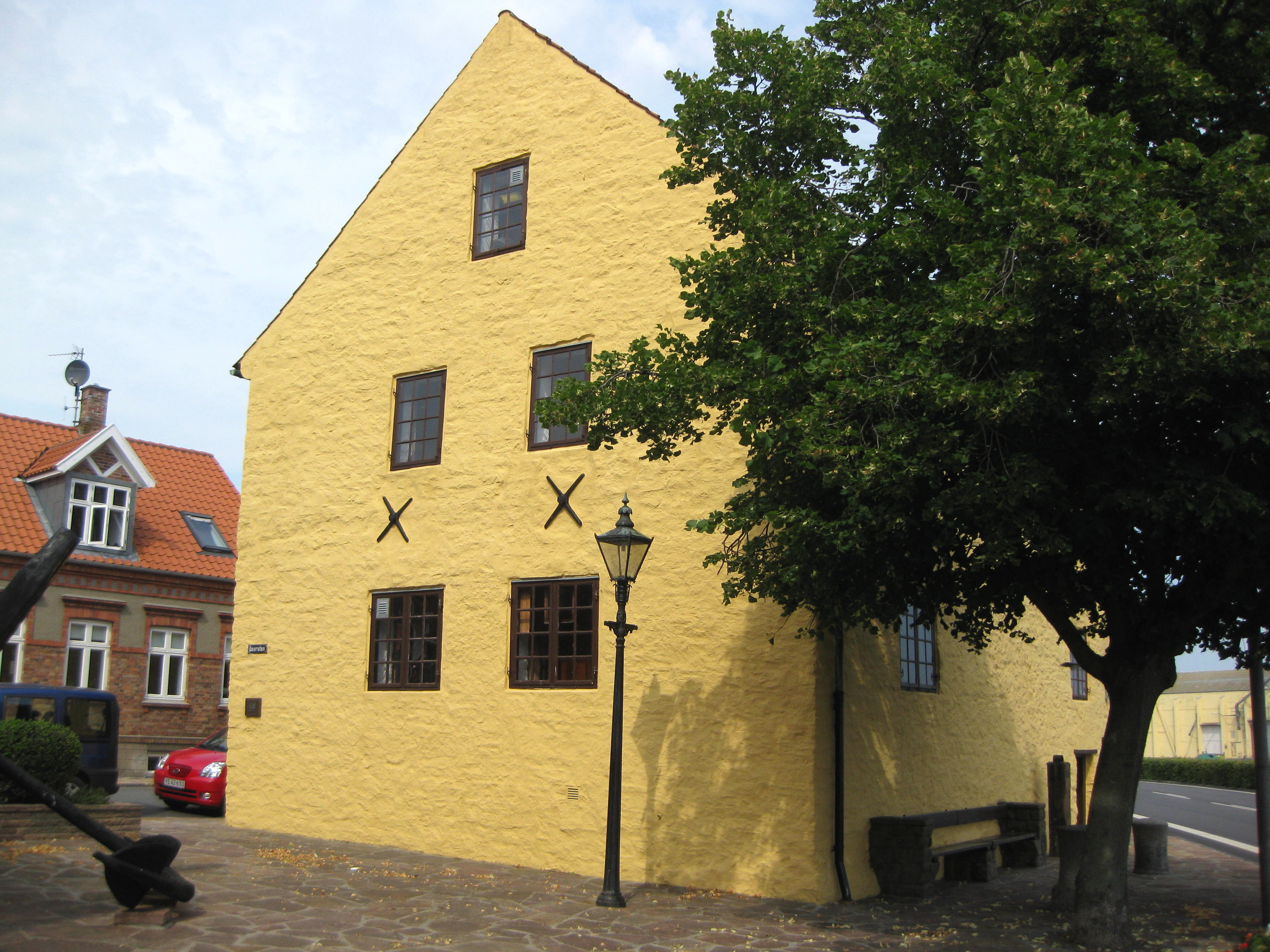
Nexø Museum

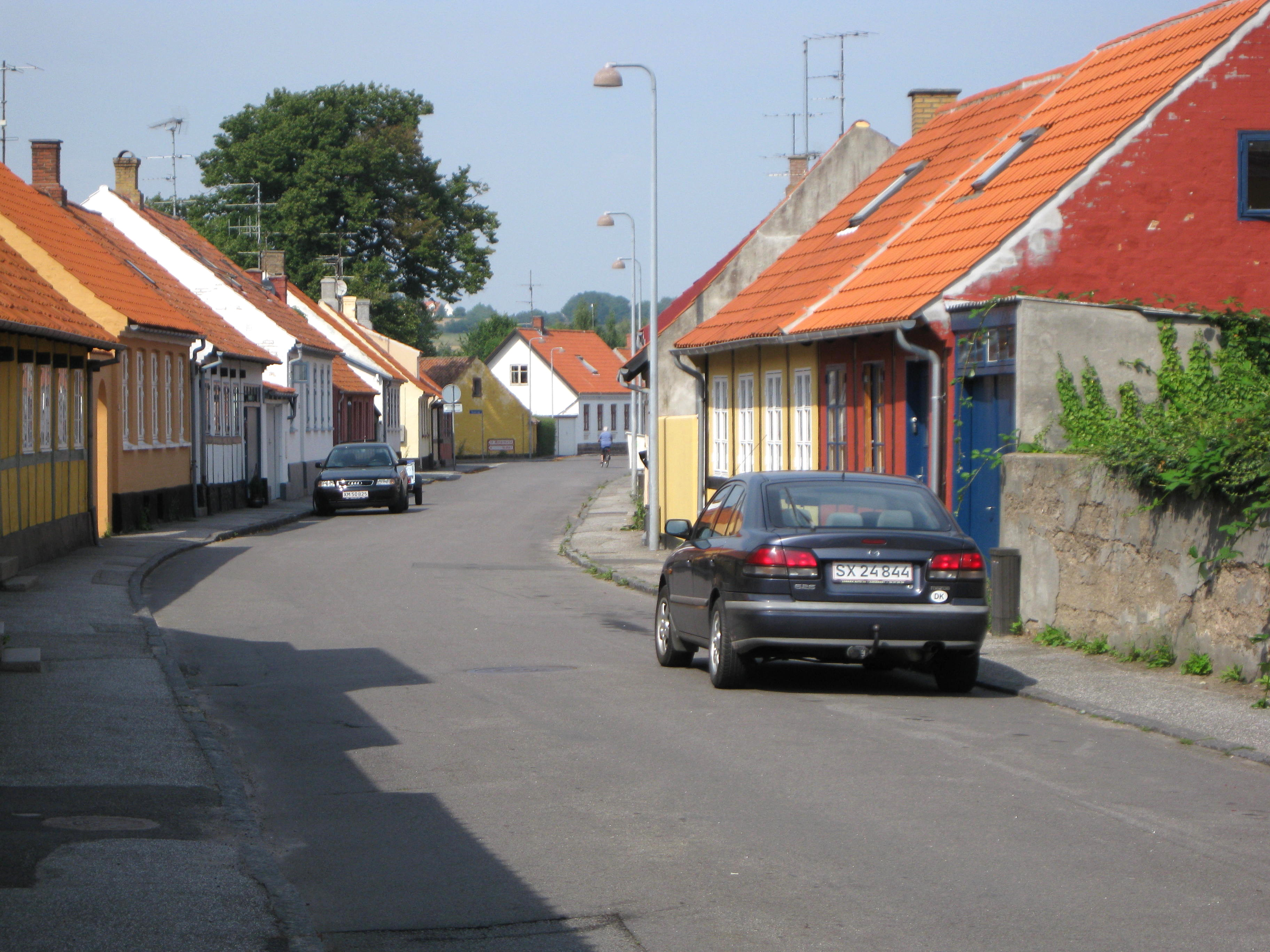
Street scene

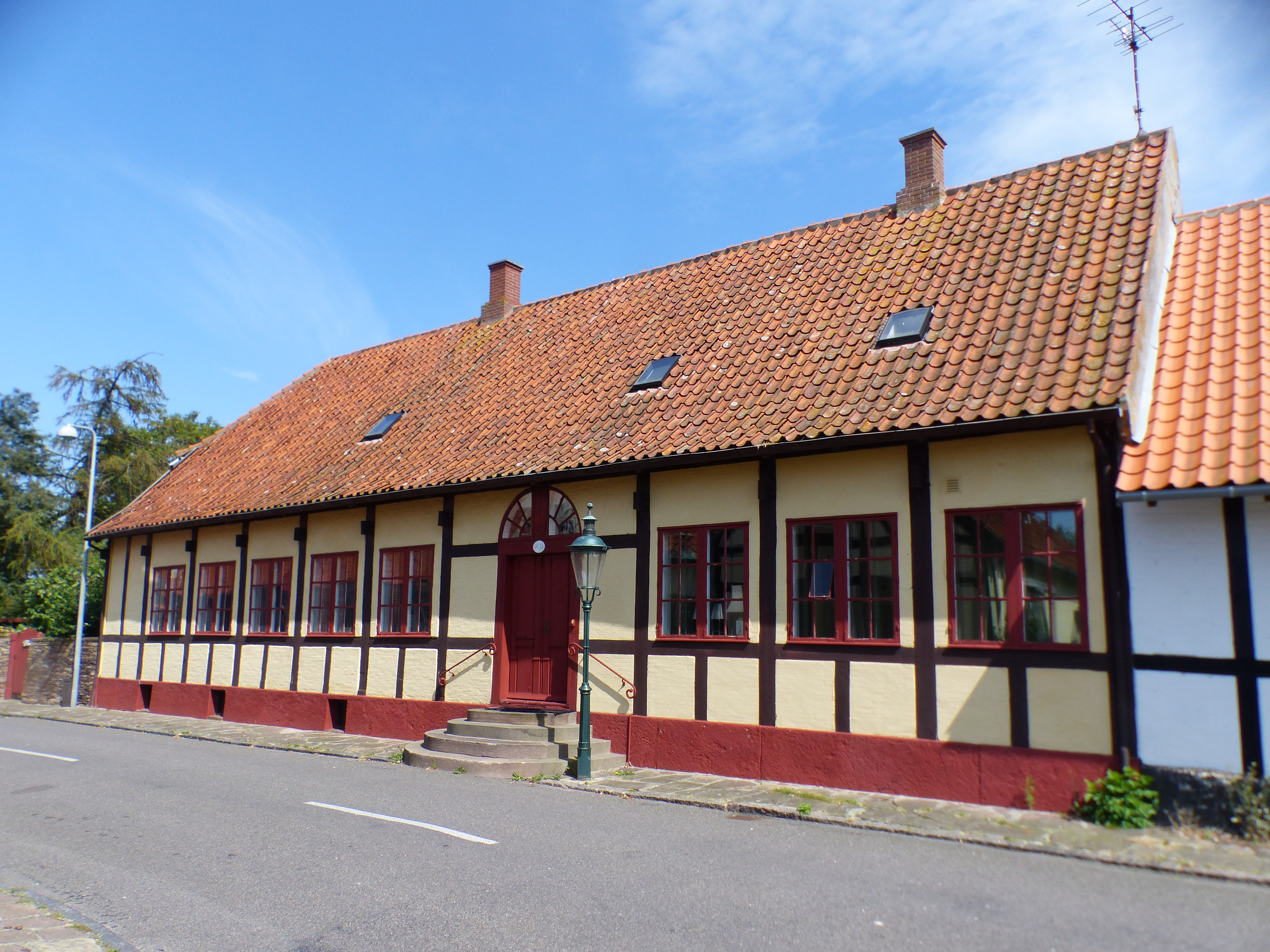
Nexø, Købmagergade, Amtsgården

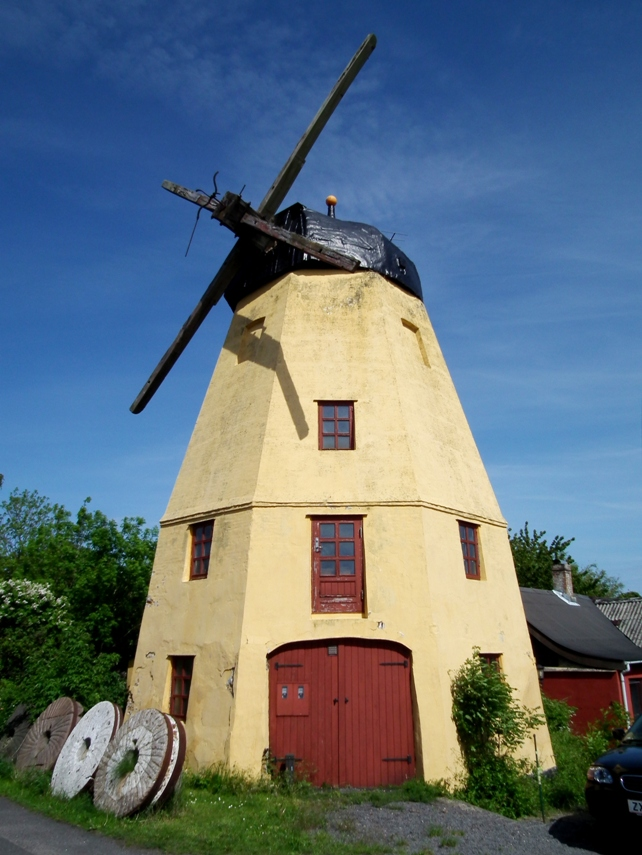
Bakkemøllen

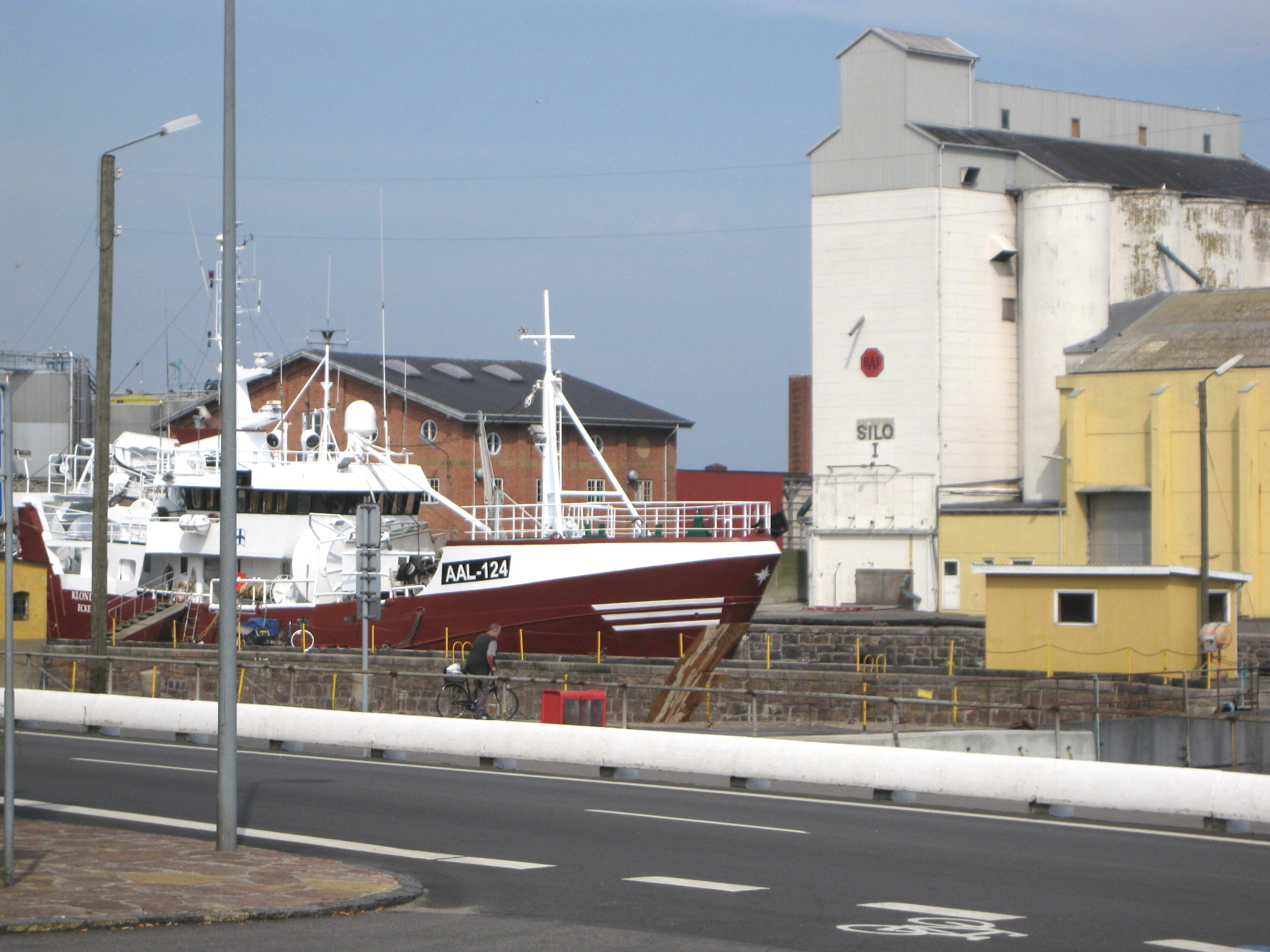
Harbour

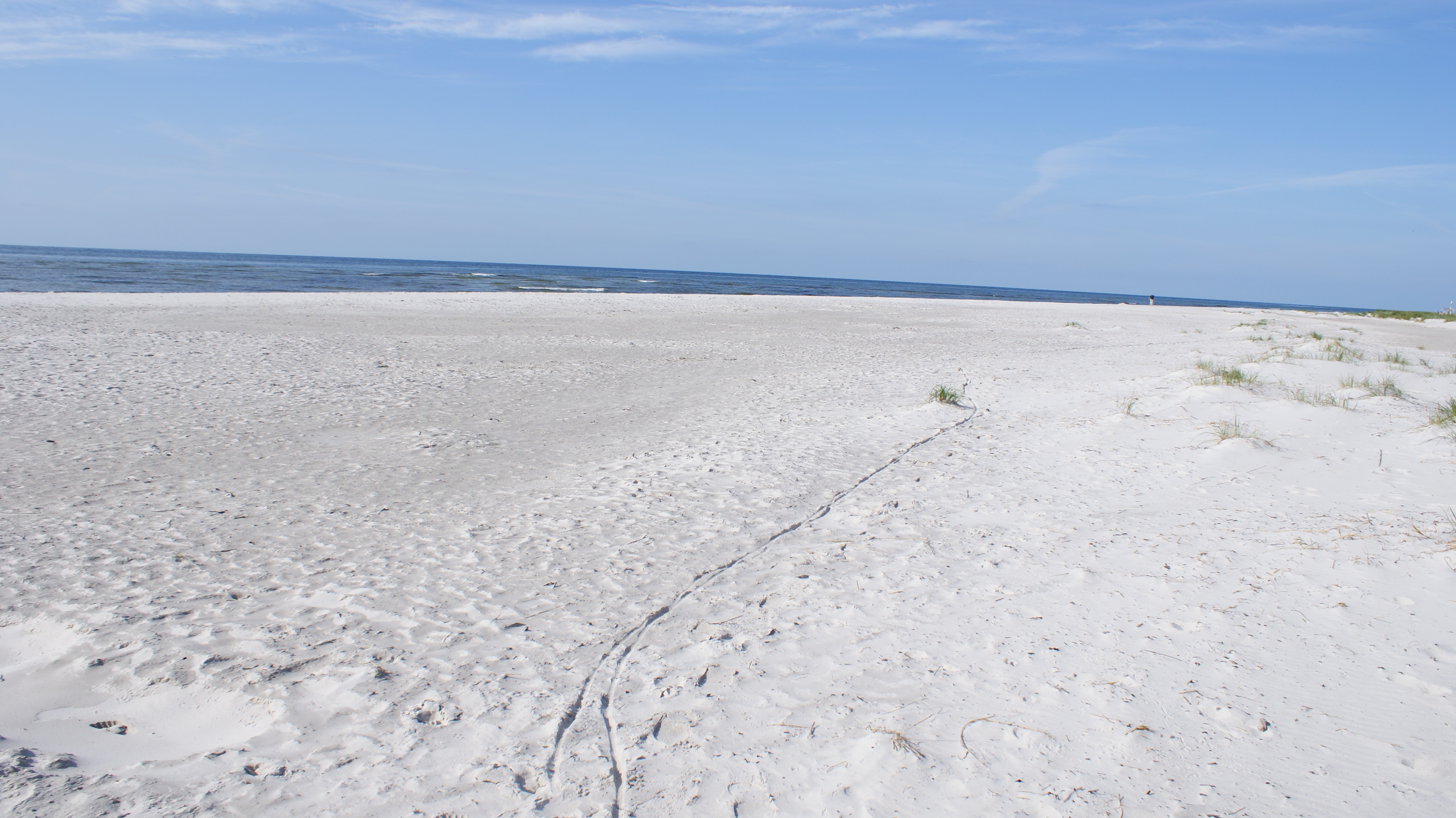
Dueodde beach
