= Bornholm Butterfly Park =

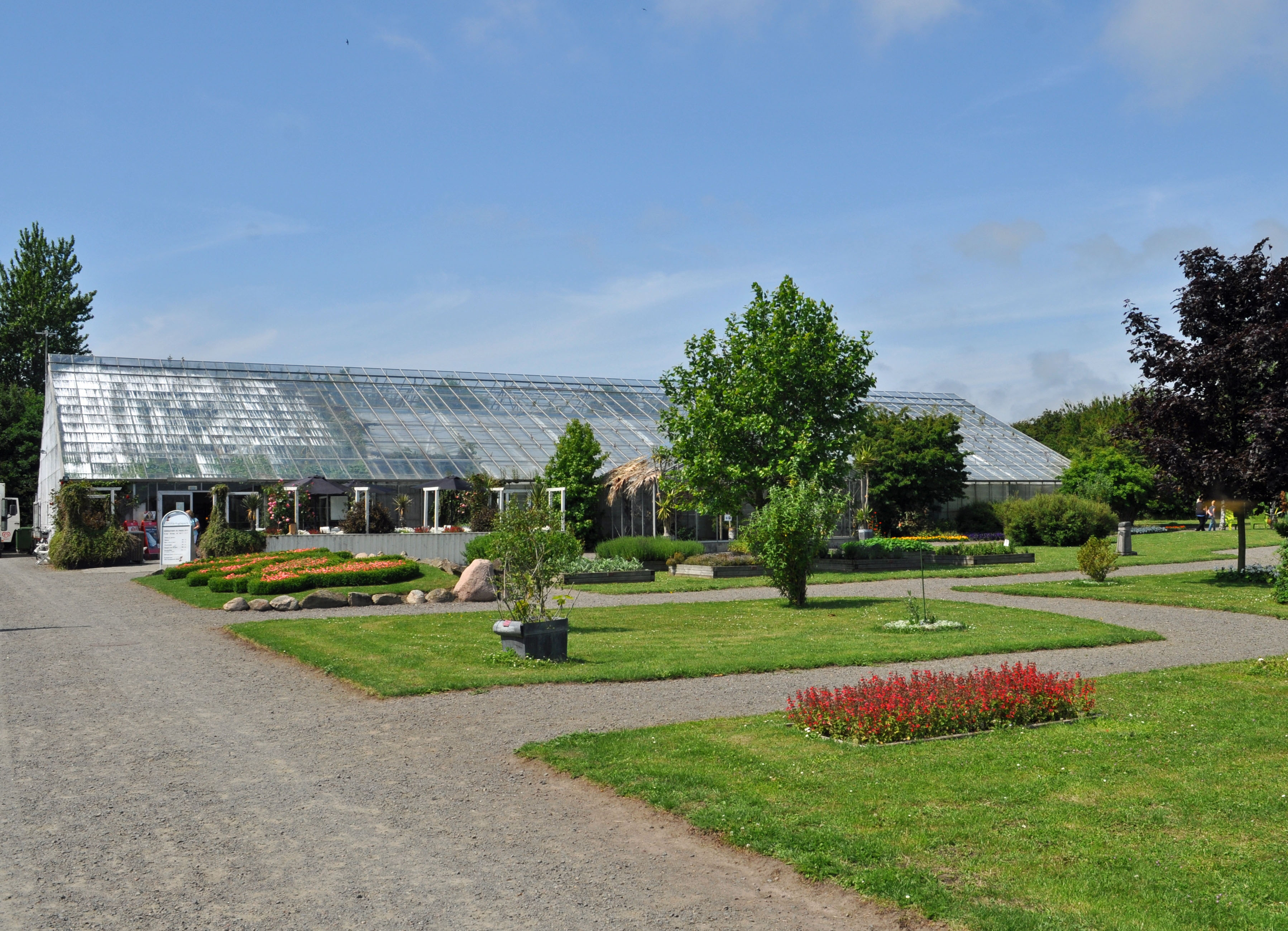
- Bornholm Butterfly Park, Nexø
- Interactive map of Bornholm Butterfly Park
- 55°03′50″N 15°07′08″E
- Date opened: 1997
- Location: Nexø, Bornholm, Denmark
- No. of animals: 1,000
- No. of species: 30+
- Annual visitors: 30,000+
- Website: www.sommer-lunden.dk

Bornholm Butterfly Park (Danish: Bornholms Sommerfuglepark) is located on the western outskirts of Nexø on the Danish island of Bornholm. Over a thousand brightly coloured butterflies from around the world can be seen in a large former hothouse while wild Danish species abound in the flowery garden.

== Description ==
The butterfly park was founded in 1997 in a former nursery garden. Visitors can experience the many different species in natural surroundings. Mating can also be seen as well as the development of eggs into caterpillars and chrysalises. In the butterfly house there are also quails which dispose of ants and snails. Japanese carp swim in the tropical lake while parrots and parakeets fly around or perch in the treetops. Species of butterfly include the Heliconius, Attacus atlas, Greta oto, Morpho peleides, Danaus plexippus, Idea leuconoe, Papilio, Phoebis philea and Caligo eurilochus.

There is also a beautifully arranged garden with lakes, waterfalls, flowers and plants. Wild Danish butterflies can be seen outside in the garden, attracted by the plants and their nectar. They include the red admiral, orange tip, small tortoiseshell, and painted lady.

== Opening hours ==
The butterfly park is open every day from May to mid-September, 10 am to 5 pm.

== Gallery ==
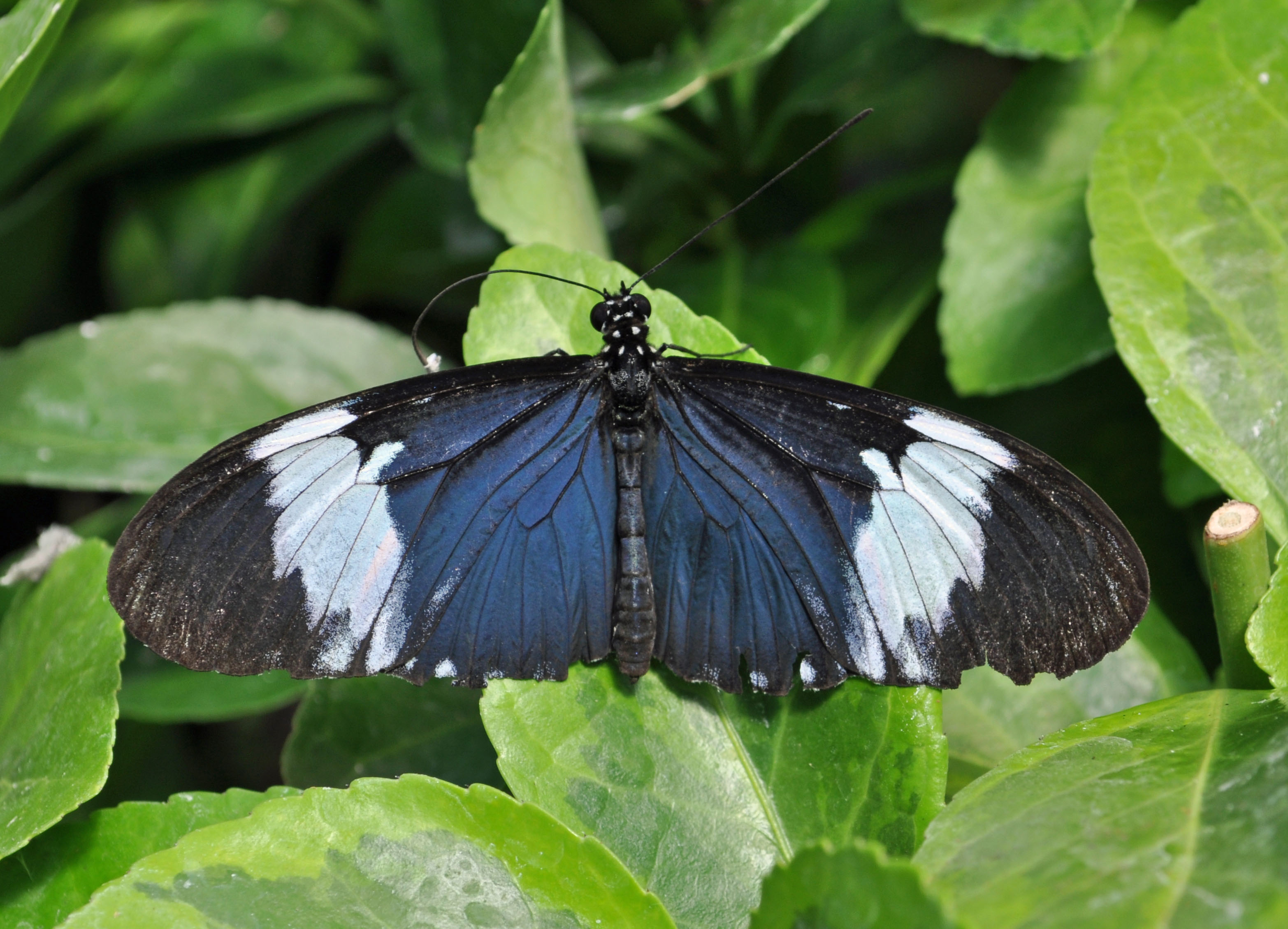

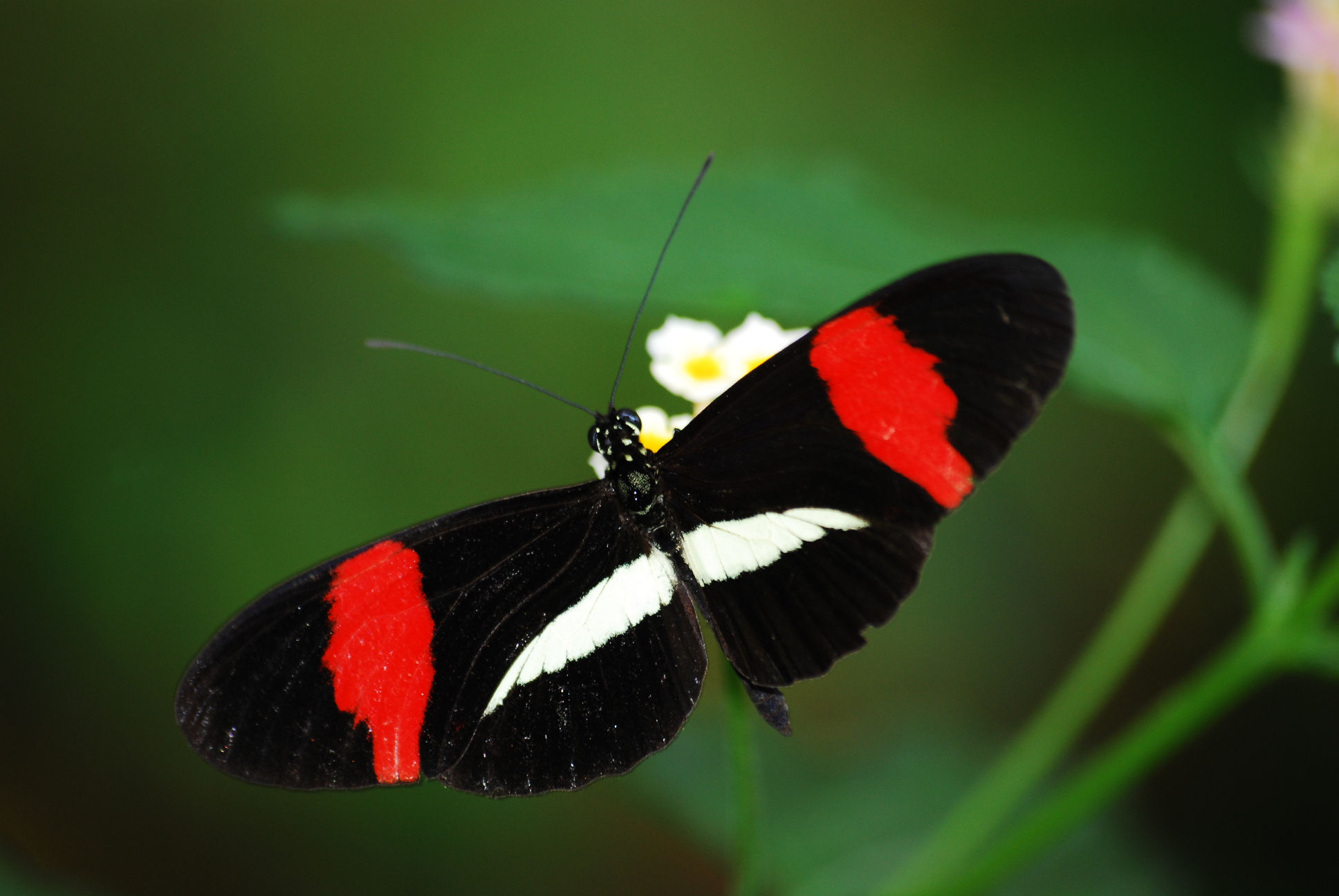

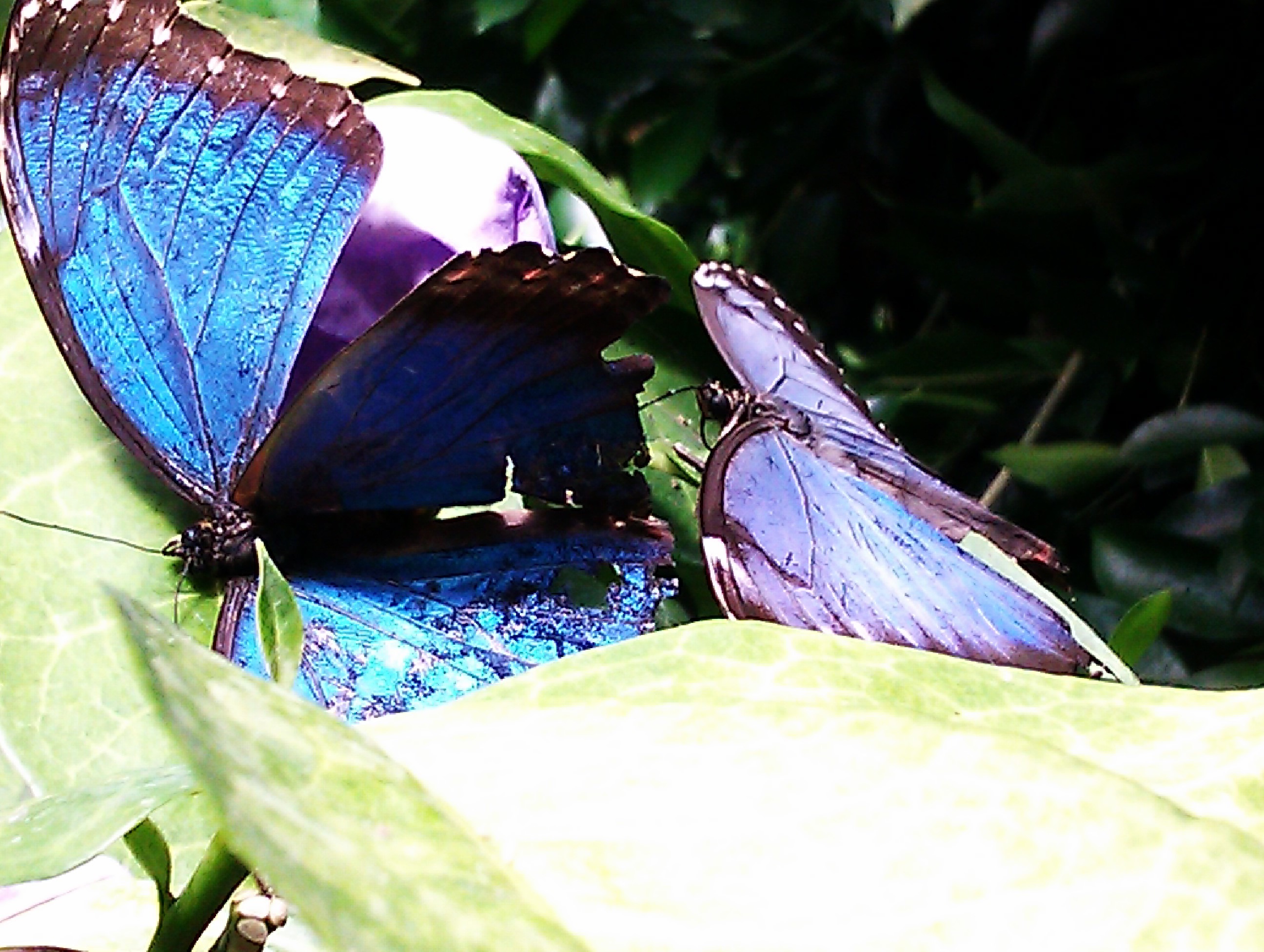

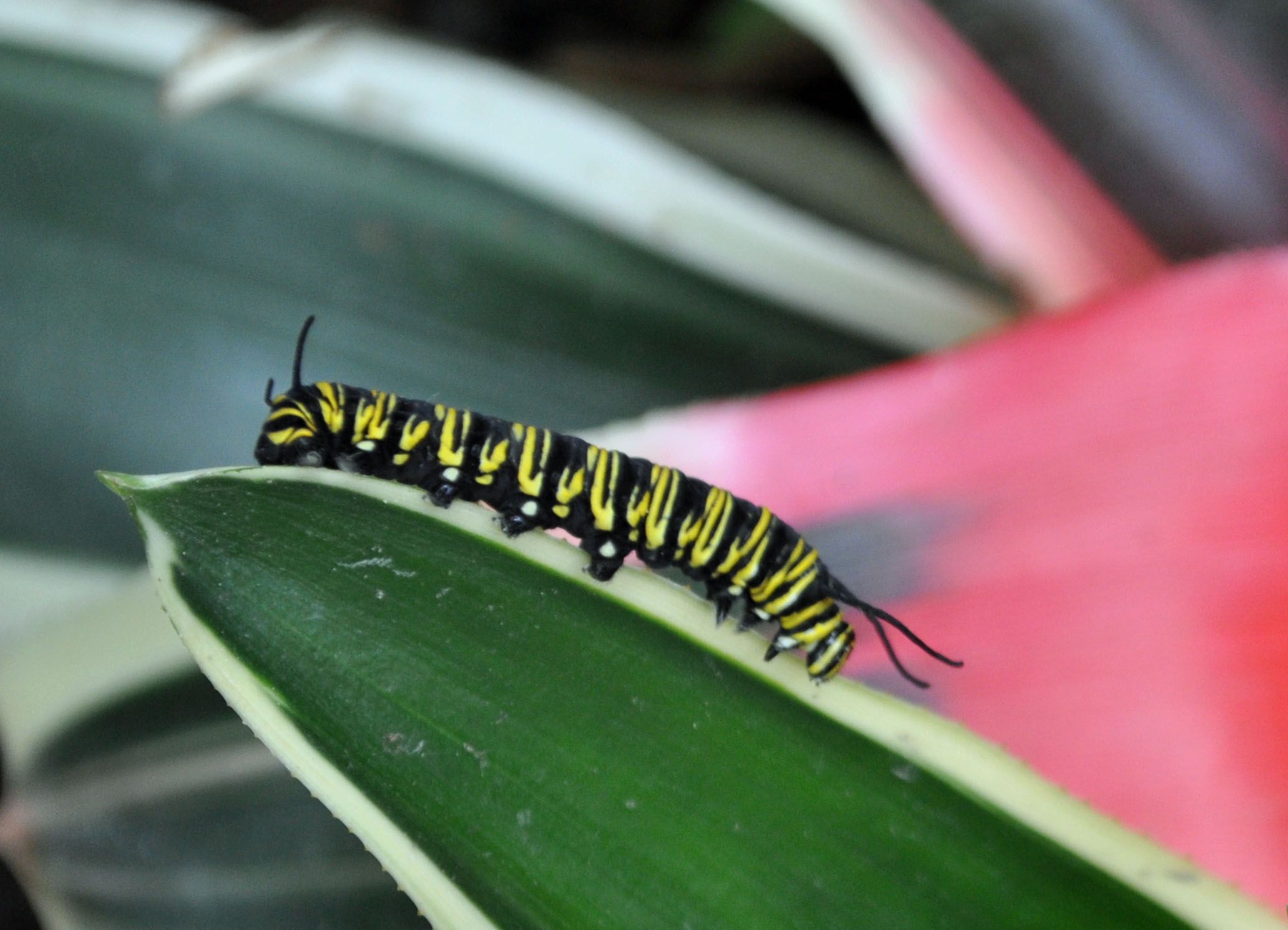

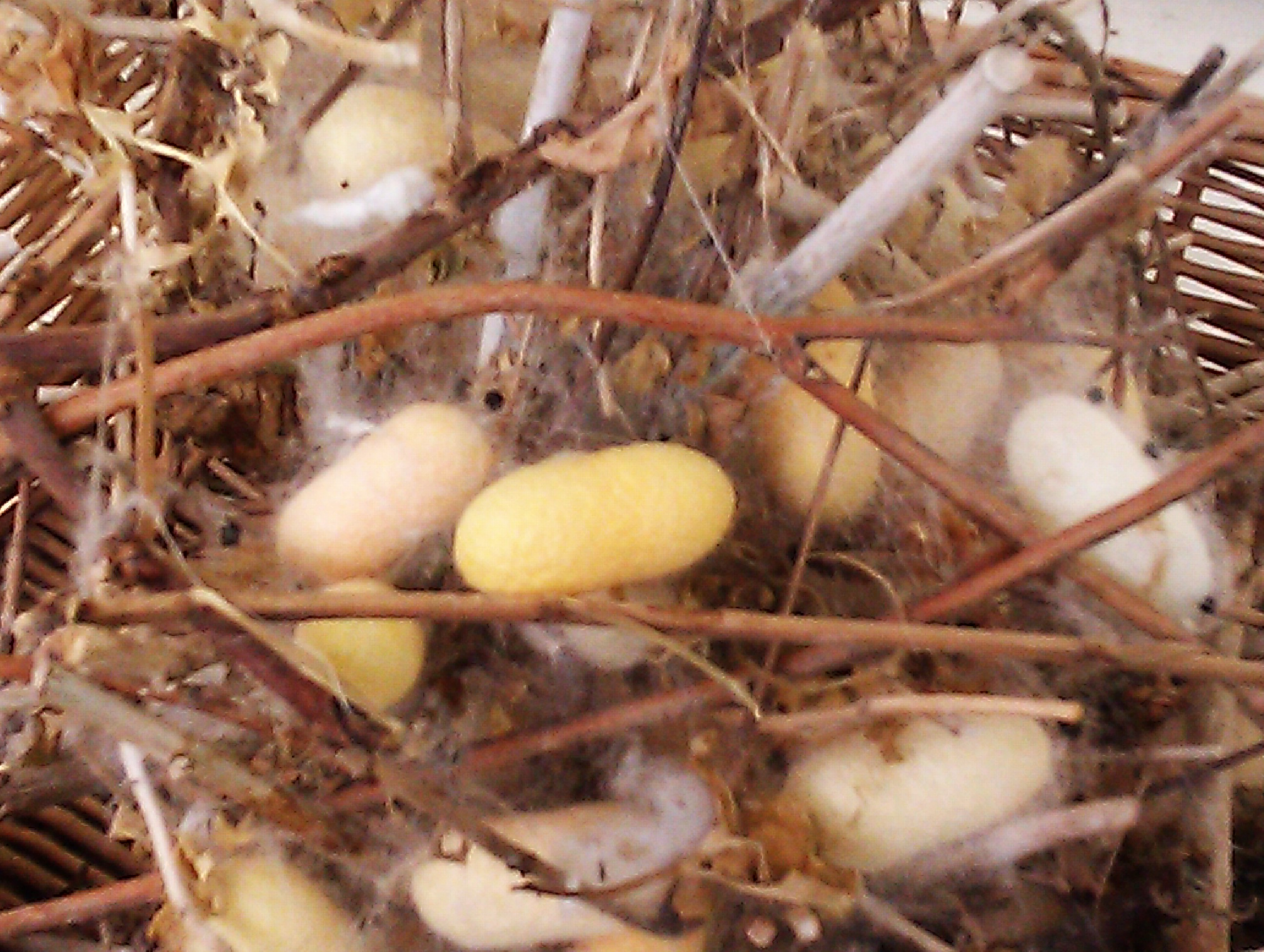

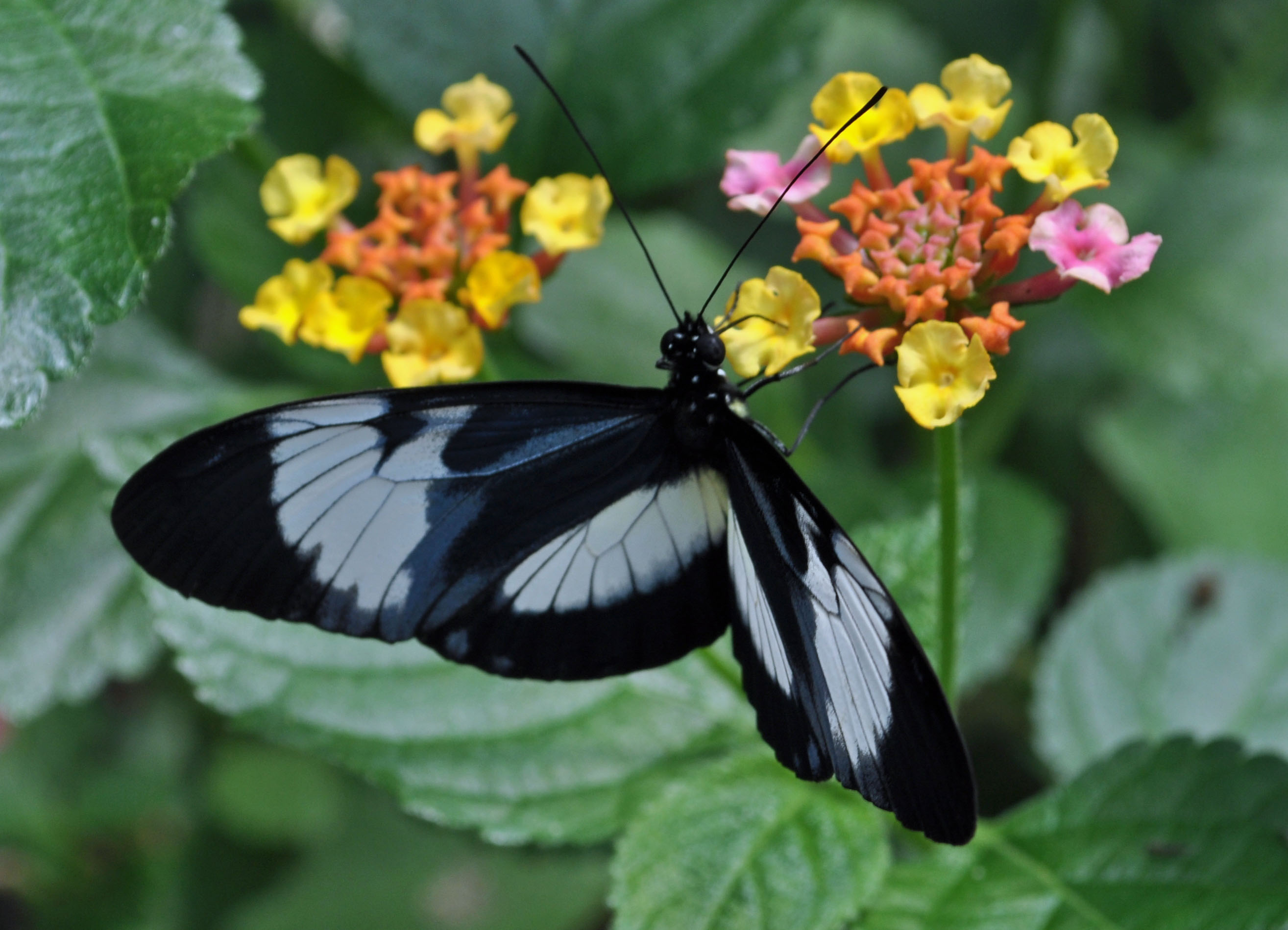

== See also ==
- List of Lepidoptera of Denmark
