= Nexø Museum =

Museum in Bornholm, Denmark

Coordinates: 55°04′07″N 15°08′04″E

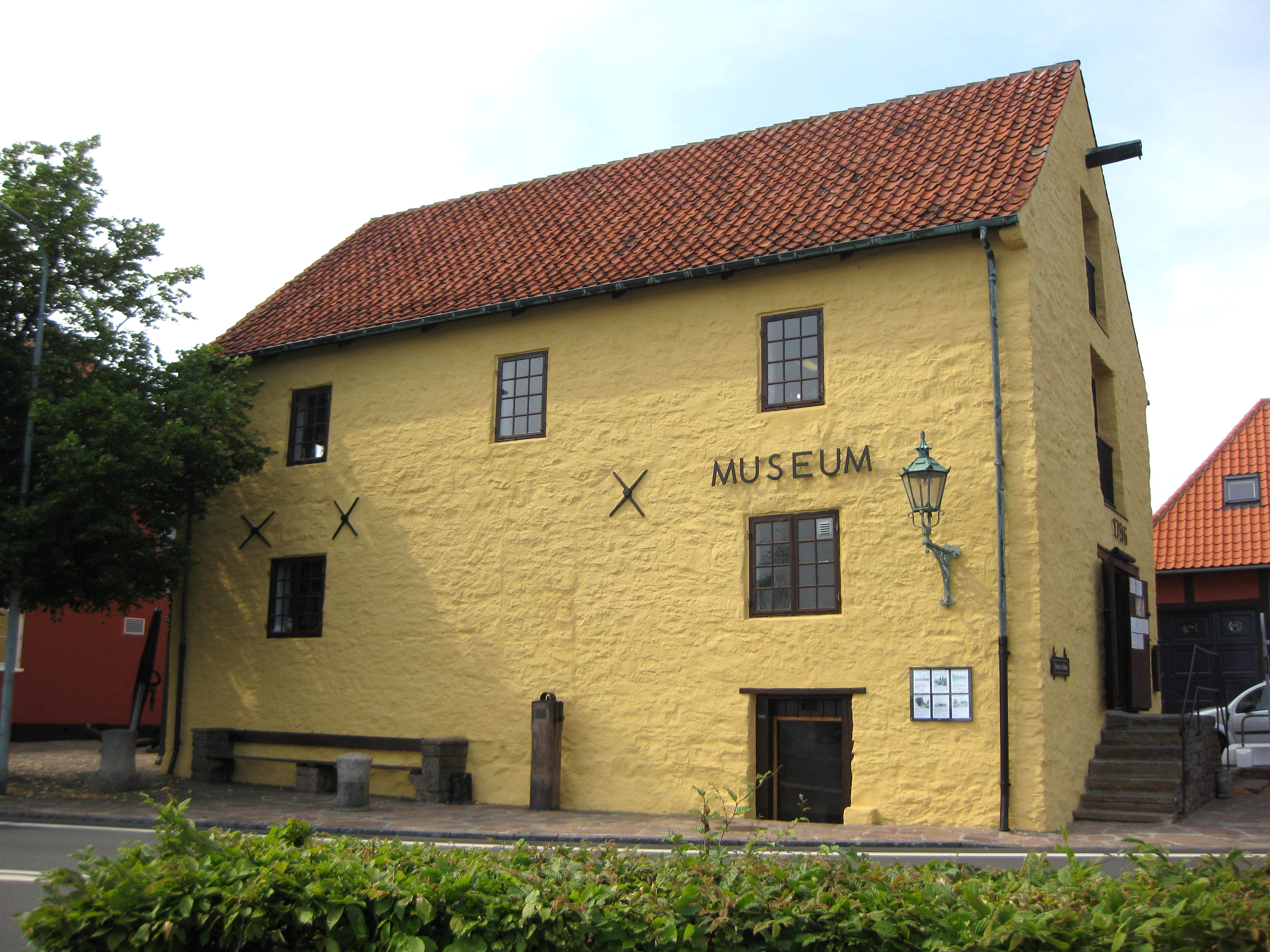
Nexø Museum, Bornholm

Nexø Museum is the town museum of Nexø on the Danish island of Bornholm. Located in the harbour area of the town, it is housed in a historic sandstone building. Exhibitions document the town's history including the periods in the 1940s when it was occupied by the Germans and bombed by the Russians.

== Building ==
The museum occupies a building from 1796 which served as the town hall until 1856 when it was replaced with a new building in Købmagergade. Around 1890, an extra storey was added.

The building was completed in 1796 as the Nexøe Vagt (Nexø Guardhouse), staffed by four members of the local force. The sandstone used for construction came from Frederiks Stenbrud (Frederik's Quarry) opened in the north of the town in 1754. It replaced an earlier building which had possibly been the venue of the negotiations in 1645 between the Swedish general Carl Gustaf Wrangel and the Danish officers. After serving as town hall until 1856, it was used as a warehouse. The walls were heightened in order to accommodate an additional storey.

== Museum ==
The museum opened in 1970. Exhibitions include coverage of the town's maritime past, its German occupation, the Soviet bombing and the Russian occupation after the war. There are documents and artefacts from Nexø's earlier businesses, including its sandstone quarry and the old brewery. The museum also exhibits reconstructions of old fisherman's dwellings.
