= Nexo Jornal =

- Website type: News website
- Available in: Portuguese
- Founded: 2015
- Headquarters: São Paulo, {{{location_country}}}
- Founders: Paula Miraglia, Renata Rizzi and Conrado Corsalette
- Editors: Antonio Mammi, Letícia Arcoverde, Rafaela Ranzani and others
- Managing director: Paula Miraglia (director-geral) and Renata Rizzi (director of strategy and business)
- Website: www.nexojornal.com.br

Nexo Jornal is a Brazilian news website. Based in São Paulo, it was founded by Paula Miraglia, Renata Rizzi, and Conrado Corsalette in April 2015 and launched to the public in November of the same year. The publication features articles on politics, economics, international events, culture, science, health, technology, arts and other topics, with an approach that prioritizes contextualization. Because it does not display advertising, a subscription is required to access the published content.

In 2017, it was awarded by the Online News Association for "overall excellence in online journalism" in the small newsroom category, in recognition of its emphasis on visual content and "creative dedication to informing and delighting."
