= Nexø Church =

Coordinates: 55.060874°N 15.132643°E

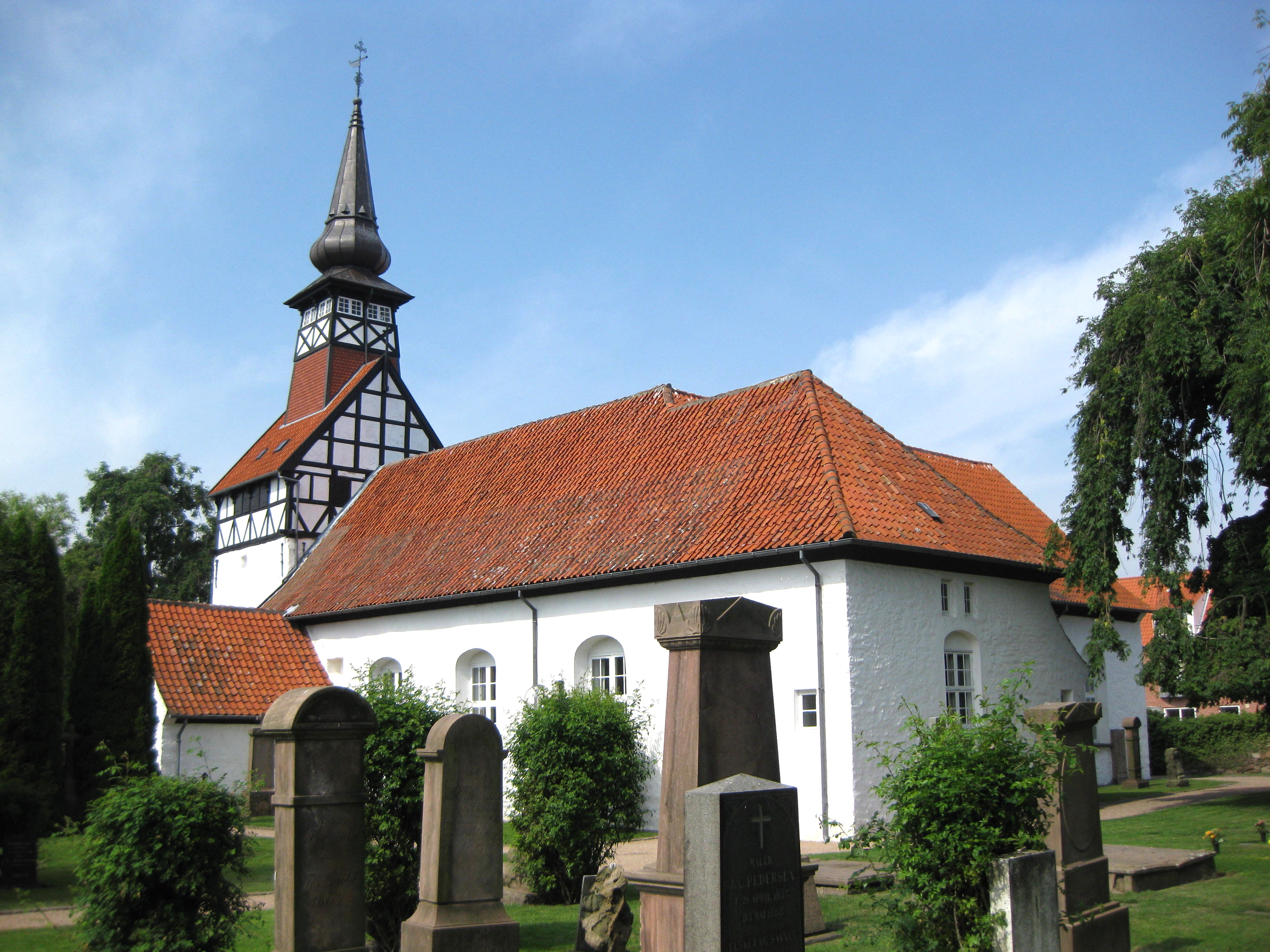
Nexø Church

Nexø Church is the parish church of Nexø, a port on the eastern coast of the Danish island of Bornholm.

== History ==
In the absence of records, it is difficult to date the building precisely, although it appears to have been established at the end of the Middle Ages, initially as a chapel for seafarers. Indeed, it was dedicated to St Nicholas, the patron saint of sailors. The church consists of a rectangular Late Gothic nave and a Renaissance tower. The porch on the north side dates from 1745. In 1760, the nave was extended with a northern wing. The southern porch was rebuilt in 1777 and in 1800, a sacristy was added at the eastern end of the nave. The walls of the nave were heightened by some 2 metres in 1731.

== Architecture ==
The nave is built of fieldstone, the walls now reaching a height of 5.10 metres. The original windows no longer exist. The more recent straight-edged windows over the porches are probably designed as gallery windows. The other large wooden-framed Empire windows were added around 1850.

The three lower storeys of the tower were built in the 16th century in the same material as the nave. The rather low tower room which opens into the church probably used to reach up to the top of the first floor. It has a curved window to the south and one with straight edges to the west. The eastern side of the tower's first floor is only closed off by the organ casing. The third storey is half-timbered on the eastern side. The bell storey is of half-timbered oak. The roof which was tiled in 1855 has a copper spire from 1910.

The northern sandstone wing was completed in 1760 as attested by the date on the crowned monogram of Frederik V. The wood-framed windows date from 1832. The chancel section of the nave and the altar were renewed in 1985 as part of general renovation work throughout the building.

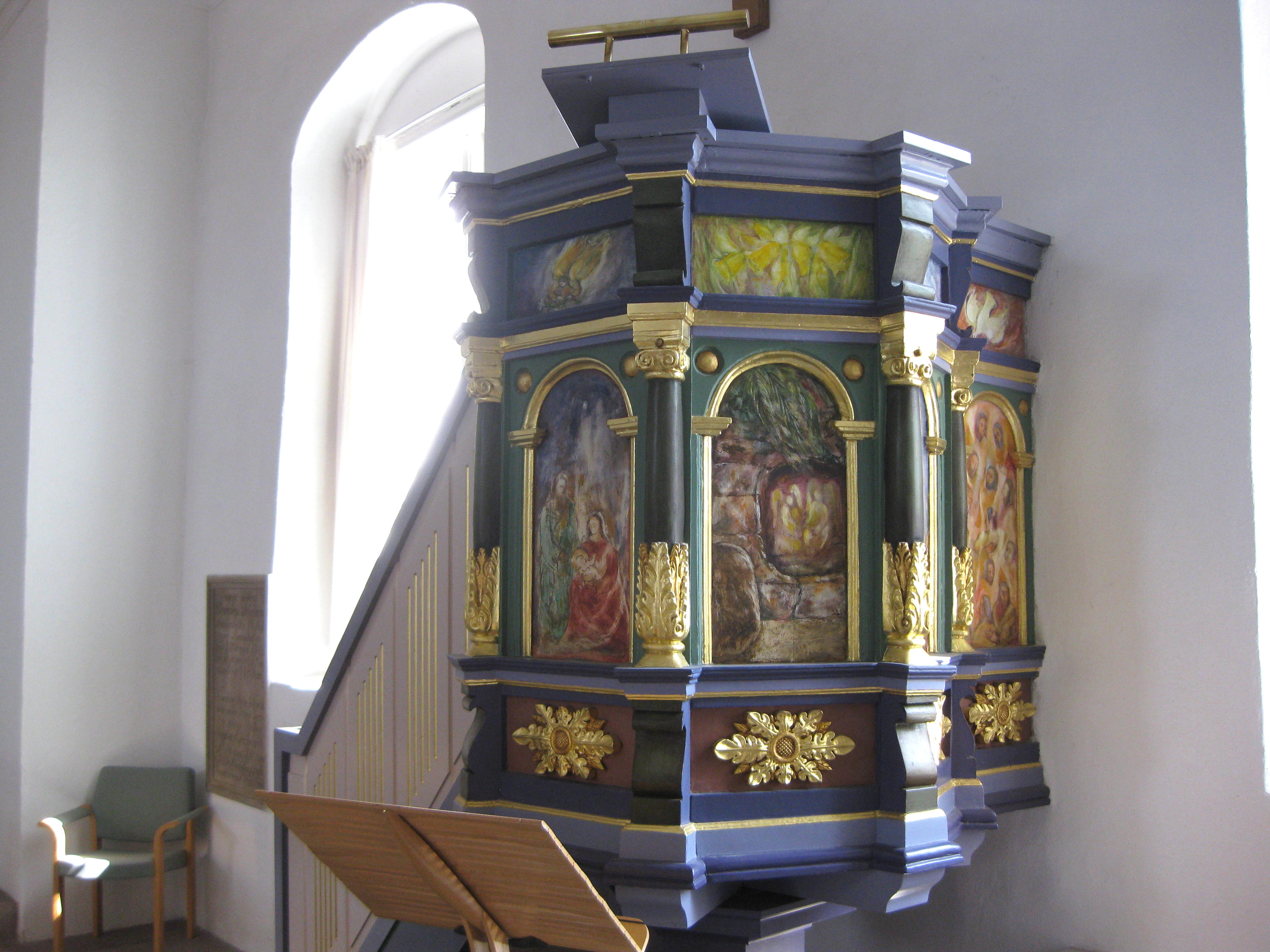
The decorated pulpit

== Interior and furnishings ==
The font from 1784 is sculpted in Nexø sandstone.

The many decorations on the north gallery include Elijah in a chariot of fire, Job and his friends, Moses with the tablets of law Jesus walking on the water, and Paul's shipwreck. The latter is particularly appropriate for the fishing port of Nexø where the dangers of the sea are well known. The pulpit and the gilded cross above it are from the 17th century. In 1995, Bodil Kaalund completed her 27 scenes from the Old and New Testaments which decorate the pulpit and the gallery.

The two large brass candlesticks on the altar were a gift from the crown prince and his wife in 1946 after repairs to the church had been completed after suffering bomb damage in May 1945.

== See also ==
- List of churches on Bornholm
